= Worcestershire County Cricket Club in 2005 =

Worcestershire Royals
2005 season
- Captain: Vikram Solanki
- Ground(s): New Road

Worcestershire County Cricket Club in 2005 played their County Championship games in Division Two and their Totesport League games in Division One. Under their new captain, Vikram Solanki, they were tipped to go straight back up to the top flight of the County Championship and started the season 9–2 second favourites to end up as Division Two champions.

They started the season with a convincing win against Derbyshire in the Championship, followed by a comfortable win over Northamptonshire in a rain-affected Sunday League game. Their second game of the Championship, against Durham at Chester-le-Street, however, was a humiliating 7 wicket defeat inside two days. They then lost a close game against Lancashire over four days, and another close game against Middlesex on the following Sunday.

On 5 May they eased past Scotland to reach the Second Round of the C&G Trophy. In the second week of May, they were humbled by Loughborough UCCE, who comfortably beat them. They recovered well, though, securing a 9 wicket win in their next Championship game, against Derbyshire, and then won a closely fought game by 16 runs against Nottinghamshire. On 17 May Worcestershire were eliminated from the C&G Trophy in the Second Round by Yorkshire. An important win came away at Essex in the fifth game in the Championship, before they lost to Glamorgan Dragons in the National League.

June started with a draw in the Championship against Division Two leaders, Durham, before Worcestershire became the first English side to lose to Bangladesh, in a one-day match at New Road. And that poor form continued, losing at Leicestershire in the Championship despite being on top for most of the match, and then being bowled out for 164 to lose a match with Essex by 39 runs in the National League.

In Twenty20, however, they found a way to recover, beating local rivals Warwickshire – it did not last long, though, because losses to Somerset and Gloucestershire followed. In fact, their only positives in the Twenty20 Cup were the two one-run victories over Warwickshire, as every other match apart from their last one with Glamorgan Dragons ended without a victory – and the last one was academic anyway. The Championship did not give any relief, either, as they lost to Yorkshire by three wickets, before Glamorgan got the better of them in the National League, where Worcestershire had now slumped to last place.

They also became the first team to lose to Northamptonshire in the Championship, as they relinquished their play-off spot with an 82-run loss. They recovered well in the National League, though, beating Gloucestershire by 20 runs on the Duckworth-Lewis method, before rain resulted in a no-result against Hampshire Hawks. A three-day match with the touring Australians ended in a draw, having been shortened to two days due to rain.

August started with two losses to Northamptonshire Steelbacks – one in the National League and one in the Championship. After an eight-day break from cricket, Worcestershire came back strongly, though, amassing 696 for 8 declared and beating Somerset by an innings, which meant they could entertain a small hope of promotion. A mixed bag of results with a win and a loss in two games in the National League followed before a Championship match with Lancashire, which they lost by an innings and 73 runs. The month ended with a home draw with Leicestershire.

Worcestershire moved out of the National League relegation zone with a victory over Gloucestershire on the first Sunday in September, before a draw with Yorkshire put them further adrift of a promotion spot in the Championship. Their National League luck was short-lived too, as they lost to Nottinghamshire and Essex on successive week-ends, leaving them precariously placed before their last match of the season – which would be a virtual play-off match against Lancashire. First, however, they drew with Essex in the Championship, before National League relegation was a fact thanks to a 75-run loss to Lancashire.

== Players ==
- Shoaib Akhtar
- Zander de Bruyn
- Chaminda Vaas
- Chris Gayle
- Kabir Ali
- Gareth Batty
- Steven Davies
- Will Gifford
- James Holloway
- Graeme Hick
- Shaftab Khalid
- Josh Knappet
- David Leatherdale
- Nadeem Malik
- Matt Mason
- Daryl Mitchell
- Stephen Moore
- Stephen Peters
- James Pipe
- Ray Price
- Ben Smith
- Stuart Wedge
- David Wigley

== Tables ==
=== Championship ===
2005 County Championship – Division Two
Pos	Team	Pld	W	D	L	Pen	Bat	Bowl	Pts
1	Lancashire	16	7	6	3	0	43	47	212
2	Durham	16	6	8	2	0	45	44	205
3	Yorkshire	16	5	10	1	0.5	49	42	200.5
4	Northamptonshire	16	5	8	3	0	45	46	193
5	Essex	16	5	7	4	0	51	36	185
6	Worcestershire	16	5	4	7	5.5	53	46	179.5
7	Leicestershire	16	3	7	6	0.5	45	45	159.5
8	Somerset	16	4	5	7	0	42	37	155
9	Derbyshire	16	1	7	8	0	31	43	116

=== totesport League ===
2005 totesport League – Division One
Pos	Team	Pld	W	L	NR	Pts
1	Essex Eagles	16	13	1	2	56
2	Middlesex Crusaders	16	10	5	1	42
3	Northamptonshire Steelbacks	16	7	7	2	32
4	Glamorgan Dragons	16	6	6	4	32
5	Nottinghamshire Outlaws	16	6	7	3	30
6	Lancashire Lightning	16	6	9	1	26
7	Gloucestershire Gladiators	16	6	9	1	26
8	Worcestershire Royals	16	5	10	1	22
9	Hampshire Hawks	16	5	10	1	22

== Match details ==
=== Derbyshire v Worcestershire (13–16 April) ===
Worcestershire (21pts) beat Derbyshire (3pts) by 10 wickets

At Derby, Worcestershire won the toss and chose to bat. Stephen Moore was run out early for 19. He held his pose, showing off his defensive shot during an appeal for leg before wicket, as Moss came in on the blind side and threw the ball at the stumps. The other opener, Stephen Peters, stayed around though, and made 55. Once Moore was out, Peters was joined by Graeme Hick, who was given lives on 8 and 57, and made 80 off 119 balls before finally being lbw for 80 off one that kept low. Vikram Solanki then went for a duck, but Worcestershire were never in trouble, finishing on 305 for 6 at close.

Worcestershire kept batting on the second day, before declaring after winning their fourth bonus point on 350 for 9. Derbyshire's batting was woeful, with no-one scoring more than 30 as their first innings ended on 135 all out, 215 behind. Matthew Mason, who took two wickets and a bowling analysis of 10–6–6–2, Alamgir Sheriyar and David Wigley, who took three each, were the main contributors with ball in hand for Worcester. The follow-on was enforced, and Derbyshire were 10 for 0 when stumps were drawn.

Only 74 overs were bowled on the third day, with rain ending play at tea. Michael di Venuto put up the Derbyshire resistance, scoring 111 in an innings that included 12 fours and 1 six before finally being stumped off Gareth Batty. Steve Stubbings played the anchor role, and had made only 33 when the first wicket fell for 150. Batty bowled unchanged for a 32 over spell as Sheriyar and Wigley tried, and failed, to get di Venuto. Once he was gone, there was a flurry of wickets to 175 for 4. At close Derbyshire were within sight of a draw, being 11 runs behind with six wickets remaining.

Gareth Batty increased his second innings tally to 5 for 87 to dismiss Derbyshire early on the fourth day, as Stubbings' innings ended with just 10 added to the previous day's score for a total of 58. By the time they were all out for 285, Derbyshire had set a target of just 71 in 68 overs. It took them only 14 as Peters and Moore won the match for them by 10 wickets. It was an easy victory for Worcestershire in the end, helped by Derbyshire dropping 6 catches along the way. Worcester coach Tom Moody said, "We haven't got our overseas players here but this was a good example of the depth of our squad. To have a successful season, you need players who can come in and stand up and be counted and they've done that. The game proved that catches win matches with Derbyshire dropping six while Worcestershire hardly missed an opportunity. We were let off the hook a bit in the first innings with some dropped chances but our catching was exceptional, particularly with the conditions being so cold. I think the cold weather was the hardest thing for Gareth [Batty] because it's difficult for a spinner to get his hands warm and grip the ball." (Cricinfo scorecard)

=== Northamptonshire v Worcestershire (17 April) ===
Worcestershire (4pts) beat Northamptonshire (0pts) by 31 runs (D/L method)

At Northampton, Worcestershire Royals captain Vikram Solanki led from the front, scoring 119 off 137 balls, including 13 fours and 1 six. Support from his colleagues took the visitors up to 211 for 4 off their 45 overs. Worcestershire director of cricket Tom Moody said of Solanki: "I can't see why he won't be in the mix for England section this summer. It depends how the selectors shuffle the deck, but I would imagine he will be in their minds for consideration at the very least. We were very confident he was ready for the challenge of captaincy and he has had a great start."

When Northampstonshire Steelbacks batted, Australian Matt Mason took 3 for 20, to leave Northamptonshire on 137 for 7 off 32.5 overs when rain prevented further play. Worcestershire won easily on the Duckworth-Lewis method. (BBC scorecard)

=== Durham v Worcestershire (20–21 April) ===
Durham (19pts) beat Worcestershire (3pts) by 7 wickets

Worcestershire won the toss at Chester-le-Street and chose to bat first. Stephen Peters and Stephen Moore started them off well as they moved to 75 without loss. Then Mark Davies, who is fighting for his first-team place, took six wickets to reduce them to 120, before Steve Harmison (3 wickets) and Paul Collingwood (1 wicket) finished off the tail to reduce Worcestershire to 171 all out. Collingwood then returned with the bat and got to 88 not out, to leave Durham well-placed on 139 for 2 at close.

On the second day, Collingwood completed his century, finally falling for 129 when Durham were 229 for 4. The Durham tail did not back up the start given to them by the specialist batsmen, however, and they were all out for 286, a lead of 115. Liam Plunkett, who had a good first game but a quiet first innings in this second game, then returned to knock out three top-order wickets. The rest of the bowling unit performed well, and Steve Harmison took a hat-trick on his way to 5 for 61. Harmison later said, "The way I was feeling, my tail was up and I felt I could go through them. The position they were in I don’t think they were too keen to hang around. Before the last ball [of the hat-trick], I felt confident. It was a decent ball in a decent area and I was glad when he [David Wigley] chopped it on."

Chaminda Vaas top-scored with 42 not out, as Worcester were all out for 146. This left Durham a target of only 32 to win, which they got for the loss of 3 wickets to win with two days spare. (Cricinfo scorecard)

=== Worcestershire v Lancashire (27–30 April) ===
Lancashire (17pts) beat Worcestershire (6pts) by 76 runs

Lancashire batted first after losing the toss at Worcester, and were soon in trouble. At 81 for 3, Andrew Flintoff, playing his first first-class match after returning from injury, came to the crease. However, after facing 5 balls he was back in the Pavilion without scoring. It got worse for Lancashire as they fell to 97 for 6 and 196 all out, mostly thanks to an unbeaten 69 from wicket-keeper Warren Hegg. In reply, Worcestershire lost Stephen Moore early, but Graeme Hick and Stephen Peters were there at close, with Worcestershire on 59 for 1.

Hick dominated the second day's play as he moved from 32 not out to 176 in 231 balls, his 127th first-class century and his 97th for Worcestershire. This now puts him tenth in the list of all-time century makers, just ahead of WG Grace. However, no other Worcester player scored more than 27 as Muttiah Muralitharan picked up 5 wickets, and they finished on 306, 110 ahead. Lancashire were 47 for 1 in reply at stumps.

There was cheer for England fans on the third day, as the England regular Flintoff was back to his belligerent best, scoring 83 from 101 balls. Stuart Law also made 83, but was slower, taking 152 balls. With support from Dominic Cork (57), Lancashire were able to set a fair target. Their 377 left Worcestershire 268 to win. They lost Peters first ball, and Moore also fell, but with Lancashire pitching short to Hick, it was 58 for 2 at close.

On the final day, 3 wickets from each of Dominic Cork and Muttiah Muralitharan helped dismiss Worcestershire for 191 runs, with David Wigley unable to bat because of a broken hand sustained when James Anderson bowled a beamer at him in the first innings. After the match Cork talking about his match performance of 7 for 115 said, "The ball is coming out well at the moment. I've worked hard with Mike Watkinson over the winter with it. It's early season and these sort of conditions suit a bowler like myself." Watkinson, in response, spoke of Lancashire's determination to get straight back into the first Division after the disappointment of relegation last season, ""We talked about the start of the season and the need to start well and to get a positive number in the wins column is a good feeling. We have two home games now coming up against Derbyshire and Durham and maybe we can kick on from here." (BBC scorecard)

=== Middlesex v Worcestershire (1 May) ===
Middlesex (4pts) beat Worcestershire (0pts) by 3 wickets (D/L method)

The Worcestershire Royals put on 201 for 7 in their 44 overs, with David Leatherdale making 72 from 83 balls in an innings in which Graeme Hick became the heaviest scorer in the Sunday League's history. New Zealander Scott Styris took 3 wickets for Middlesex Crusaders, and kept the visitors from scoring freely. Middlesex made heavy work of overturning this total, even though they had 104 on the board before the first wicket fell. But ultimately they retained their 100% Sunday League record with 3 wickets and 1 over left. (BBC scorecard)

=== Scotland v Worcestershire (4–5 May) ===
Worcestershire beat Scotland by 10 wickets to progress to Round Two of the C&G Trophy

The first day at The Grange saw no play because of rain. After losing the toss, Scotland were put in, and the bowlers immediately made it very difficult for Scotland. It took them six overs to make their first ten runs, and every time they tried to accelerate, they lost wickets. In the end, they could only muster 134 all out in 46.5 overs. Vikram Solanki and Stephen Moore made this target look easy, passing the required 135 runs without losing a wicket in 5 balls fewer than 20 overs. Both batsmen made half-centuries. (Cricinfo scorecard)

=== Worcestershire v Loughborough UCCE (8–10 May) ===
Loughborough UCCE beat Worcestershire by 8 wickets

Loughborough UCCE had a good first day at Kidderminster, putting on 233 for the loss of 4 wickets. Loughborough's Richard Clinton, who also played thirteen first class games for Surrey this season, made 106, and put on 197 for the first wicket with Edward Foster. They then went on to dominate Worcestershire on the second day. After declaring on 304 for 6, Steven Clark took 5 for 29 as the county team was dismissed for a miserly 133 – with four batsmen, including both openers, making ducks. Only two Worcestershire players, Zander de Bruyn (81) and Jamie Pipe (23) reached double figures. Worcester made 68 for 2 following-on by stumps on the second day.

The third day saw the students wrap up a convincing victory, dismissing Worcestershire for 209 before rattling off the winning runs to finish on 41 for 2. This gave Loughborough UCCE their first first-class win since they were given first-class status three years ago, and represents the second win for a student side of the season (after Bradford/Leeds UCCE beat Surrey). (Cricinfo scorecard)

=== Worcestershire v Derbyshire (11–14 May) ===
Worcestershire (22pts) beat Derbyshire (5pts) by 9 wickets

Worcestershire's Stephen Moore dominated the first innings, making 246 as they climbed to 478. The score would have been a lot less if it weren't for Jamie Pipe, who came in with the score on 300 for 8 and put on 80, sharing a 173-run stand with Moore – eight short of the county ninth-wicket record from 1907. In reply Derbyshire were bowled out for 263, with no player making a half-century. The follow-on was enforced and Derbyshire did do better, but their 314 set Worcester a target of 100, which they easily knocked off for the loss of one wicket. Derbyshire's second innings included 7 lbws. (Cricinfo scorecard)

=== Worcestershire v Nottinghamshire (15 May) ===
Worcestershire (4pts) beat Nottinghamshire (0pts) by 16 runs

Nottinghamshire Outlaws recorded their fourth successive loss, this time at New Road to Worcestershire. It was the Africans who made the most impact, as Zander de Bruyn's 62 laid the foundation for a target of 191 that was to become too large for the visitors, while the exiled Zimbabwean spinner Ray Price took four wickets for 21. With Nottinghamshire's overseas players, Stephen Fleming (5) and David Hussey (2) being removed early by Sri Lankan fast bowler Chaminda Vaas, the visitors were in trouble, and Price and de Bruyn – who came on first and second change – tied them down effectively, with 4–21 and 0–20 respectively. Even Paul Franks' and Gareth Clough's late attempts at hitting runs backfired, and Nottinghamshire were bowled out for 174. (Cricinfo scorecard)

=== Yorkshire v Worcestershire (17 May) ===
Yorkshire beat Worcestershire by 14 runs to progress to the Quarter-Finals of the C&G Trophy

Yorkshire batted first at Headingley and fared poorly at first, slumping to 88 for 4 when Michael Vaughan cut the ball from Zander de Bruyn onto his stumps. Craig White and Anthony McGrath then put on 83 in 22 overs, and late hitting gave Yorkshire a defendable total of 241 for 9 with 52 off the last 5 overs. The Worcestershire innings followed a similar course. First they were reduced to 50 for 3, and then Kabir Ali (67) and Zander de Bruyn (82) came together, putting on 117. White then interrupted them, taking three wickets. The run-chase was thus effectively curtailed, and Worcestershire finished well behind on 227 for 8. (Cricinfo scorecard)

=== Essex v Worcestershire (20–23 May) ===
Worcestershire (21pts) beat Essex (4pts) by eight wickets

Essex and Worcestershire took notice of the bad weather forecasts, racking up runs swiftly at Chelmsford. The Essex batting effort was not very spectacular, and only Ronnie Irani's 85 saved some grace for Essex as wickets tumbled amid showers on the first day. They finished 220 all out as Worcestershire's bowlers teamed up, Matthew Mason the best with four for 48. In reply, Ben Smith made a century including fourteen fours, and with help of Gareth Batty (54) and Kabir Ali (53), both former England players, Worcestershire got to 383 all out – a lead of 163. Alastair Cook, Essex' 20-year-old prodigy, made a quick 46, but it was their 37-year-old Zimbabwean Andy Flower who, as so many times before, was the top scorer and the rock of the Essex innings with 85 – which led them to 329.

Setting Worcestershire a paltry 167 to win, Essex got off to a good start bowling, removing opener Stephen Peters for 0 and nightwatchman and wicketkeeper Jamie Pipe for 11 just before stumps, as Darren Gough and Dale Steyn took a wicket each for Essex. On the fourth day, however, Stephen Moore built on his good batting form after 246 against Derbyshire a week before, however, making 63 not out and pairing up with Graeme Hick (76 not out) for 146 runs to win the match with relative ease. (Cricinfo scorecard)

=== Glamorgan v Worcestershire (27 May) ===
Glamorgan (4pts) beat Worcestershire (0pts) by 53 runs

David Hemp gave Glamorgan Dragons a much needed win in the National League against Worcestershire Royals, as his 65 lifted the team to an unchasable 227. Despite three run outs, Glamorgan were rather pleased with their innings, but probably more pleased with their bowling – everyone got wickets, and the great batsman of the innings Zander de Bruyn, who made 51, was eventually frustrated enough to get run out. Former England U-19 player David Harrison notched up his second List A career five-wicket-haul, taking five for 33. (Cricinfo scorecard)

=== Worcestershire v Middlesex (30 May) ===
Middlesex (4pts) beat Worcestershire (0pts) by 32 runs

Middlesex Crusaders were lifted by a massive 160-run partnership between New Zealand all-rounder Scott Styris and former England Test player Ed Smith as they assembled 224 for 7 in a rain-shortened match at Worcester, in which Worcestershire's bowlers delivered six maiden overs. However, Worcestershire Royals' reply were hampered by wickets falling everywhere, along with lack of responsibility to keep the run-rate up, as Vikram Solanki made 40 off 66 balls and Zander de Bruyn 55 off 74 – too slow to chase 225 in 44 overs. When Gareth Batty was run out, a rot set in, as Worcestershire lost five wickets for 15 runs and were forced to crawl to 192 for 9. (Cricinfo scorecard)

=== Worcestershire v Durham (1–4 June) ===
Worcestershire (9pts) drew with Durham (9pts)

The first day at Worcester was washed out by rain. Durham batted to 256 when they finally got a chance to bat on the second day, but more rain meant Worcestershire could only get to 226 for 7 at close on the third day, and a draw was a formality. This was confirmed with the innings closing at 267 all out, and Durham chose not to chase a victory, declaring on 180 for 2 with Paul Collingwood on 103 not out when stumps were drawn on the final day. (Cricinfo scorecard)

=== Somerset v Worcestershire (8–11 June) ===
Worcestershire (22pts) beat Somerset (8pts) by eight wickets

Having won the toss and chosen to bat first at Bath, Somerset made 408 in the first innings including 127 by Matthew Wood and 55 by South Africa's Graeme Smith, captaining the side. Worcestershire put on 423 in reply, Ben Smith going on to make 140 and Stephen Moore 86 after both were dropped at slip in double figures by Ian Blackwell. Andy Caddick took five for 132 in a 31-over effort for Somerset. Worcestershire then cemented their control over the game by dismissing Somerset for 152 in the second innings, with Matt Mason taking 5 for 34. The Worcestershire batsmen achieved the target of 138 for the loss of just 2 wickets, Moore making his second fifty of the match with an unbeaten 66. (Cricinfo scorecard)

=== Worcestershire v Bangladeshis (12 June) ===
The Bangladeshis beat Worcestershire by four wickets

Bangladesh recorded their first victory of their tour of England when they beat Worcestershire at The County Ground, Worcester. In a disciplined bowling effort, Nazmul Hossain took two early wickets, Worcestershire collapsed to 168 (despite Bangladesh giving up 33 wides and 6 no-balls), and in a slow, gritty chase, the Bangladeshis – guided by Habibul Bashar's 26 not out and 43 from Javed Omar, made it to the target with 14 overs to spare. (Cricinfo scorecard)

=== Leicestershire v Worcestershire (15–18 June) ===
Leicestershire (18pts) beat Worcestershire (6pts) by 12 runs

Worcestershire were on top of Leicestershire for three and a half days at Grace Road, yet lost the match. Despite Dinesh Mongia scoring a quickfire 66, Leicestershire could only scamper 225 in their first innings, Ray Price taking three for 29 with economical off-spin and Nadeem Malik taking his fourth career five-wicket-haul. In reply, Worcestershire made 323, young batsman Daryl Mitchell making a gruelling 63 not out in five hours while Zander de Bruyn top-scored with 67. Leicestershire then collapsed to 149 for 8, thanks to tight bowling from Price who got four wickets, but experienced wicketkeeper Paul Nixon lifted them with a fine 85 before being run out. The last two partnerships added 89 runs, lifting Worcestershire's target to 141 in about 50 overs – very gettable in most cases. And when Worcestershire were 95 for 4 with the two young batsmen Steven Davies and Mitchell at the crease, it still looked possible. But Davies trod on his wicket attempting to pull a short ball, Mitchell was lbw to Mongia, Ray Price was run out for a five-ball duck, and despite double-figure scores from Chaminda Vaas and Matt Mason Worcestershire fell thirteen short of their target. (Cricinfo scorecard)

=== Worcestershire v Essex (19 June) ===
Essex (4pts) beat Worcestershire (0pts) by 39 runs

In a low-scoring match at New Road in Worcester, Essex Eagles prevailed to take a four-point lead into the month-long break in the National League, defending 203 for 9 with relative ease. Having won the toss, skipper Ronnie Irani was the first victim of the Worcestershire Royals bowling with a three-ball duck. Chaminda Vaas and Ray Price got two wickets each as Essex' batting faltered, but 34 from Ryan ten Doeschate saved the visitors. Worcestershire started positively, Graeme Hick and Stephen Moore pairing up for 66 for the first wicket, but part-timer William Jefferson removed both of them in quick succession to start the Worcestershire rot. With only Stephen Peters surviving hostile bowling, scoring 41 not out, Worcestershire eventually finished on 164 all out. (Cricinfo scorecard)

=== Worcestershire v Warwickshire (22 June) ===
Worcestershire (2pts) beat Warwickshire (0pts) by one run

In the local battle at New Road, Worcestershire Royals eked out a victory over rivals Warwickshire Bears. Graeme Hick and Ben Smith both made big scores, with 67 and 47, and skipper Gareth Batty also made 21 to send Worcestershire to 177 for 7. Warwickshire then collapsed to accurate bowling, losing their entire top order except Jonathan Trott to end up on 68 for 5 – but Michael Powell made 40 not out batting at seven, turning the innings almost back to Warwickshire's favour. In the end, however, they were two runs short, their No. 11 Nick Warren only managing to hit one off the two balls he faced. (Cricinfo scorecard)

=== Somerset v Worcestershire (23 June) ===
Somerset (2pts) beat Worcestershire (0pts) by 15 runs

Despite captain Graeme Smith becoming victim of Zander de Bruyn's bowling for just two runs, Somerset Sabres still posted a big target, thanks to Matthew Wood, who made 94 off only 35 balls before falling to Nadeem Malik six short of a century. Wood's smashing helped the Sabres to 210 for 6, although no other batsman passed 30. Graeme Hick tried to emulate Wood, but could only make 87 before Ian Blackwell got the better of him, and from then on Worcestershire never really had a chance. Blackwell finished with two for 20 in his four overs, and could take his share of the honour for Somerset's surprising win. (Cricinfo scorecard)

=== Gloucestershire v Worcestershire (26 June) ===
Gloucestershire (2pts) beat Worcestershire (0pts) by five wickets

This was a game of two batsmen. After Simon Kirby had ripped out two Worcestershire Royals wickets early on, to finish with figures of two for 15 from four overs, the Royals had been 24 for 3. Zander de Bruyn then hit eight fours and three sixes in his 76 not out, lifting the Royals to 162 for 6 and setting a potentially tricky target. However, William Weston replied with 73 not out of his own, and despite only Craig Spearman passing 20 of the other batsmen, Weston secured a win for Gloucestershire with two balls to spare. (Cricinfo scorecard)

=== Worcestershire v Northamptonshire (27 June) ===
Northamptonshire (2pts) beat Worcestershire (0pts) by 37 runs

David Sales (59 runs) and Usman Afzaal (46) lifted Northamptonshire Steelbacks to a very competitive total of 180 for 6 at New Road, where Shoaib Akhtar bowled a maiden over but was smashed for thirty-three runs in the other three overs he bowled. The hosts' innings saw Worcestershire Royals lose Graeme Hick early on, and despite 53 from Stephen Moore, Northamptonshire's bowlers had a good grip on the Worcestershire players – Johann Louw got the best figures for the Steelbacks with three for 25 – and Worcestershire finished on 143 for 8. (Cricinfo scorecard)

=== Warwickshire v Worcestershire (1 July) ===
Worcestershire (2pts) beat Warwickshire (0pts) by one run

Worcestershire Royals took their second successive one-run victory over Warwickshire Bears, to the agony of home fans at Edgbaston. After Heath Streak took two early wickets, Neil Carter entered the scene as the sixth bowler to be used. He took five wickets inside four overs, for 19 runs, as Worcestershire were all out for 141 with seven balls to spare. In reply, two run outs and wickets from Gareth Batty and Zander de Bruyn left Warwickshire trailing by 60 with one wicket in hand, with Heath Streak and James Anyon at the crease. Streak rotated the strike well, facing most of the balls and hitting most of the runs, and brought the score to 140 for 9 with a ball to spare. Then – setting off for the last run that would tie the scores (and win the match for Warwickshire on fewer wickets lost) – Streak was run out for 59, off 32 balls, and Warwickshire's quarter-final hopes were dented, but not wiped out. (Cricinfo scorecard)

=== Worcestershire v Gloucestershire (2 July) ===
Gloucestershire (2pts) beat Worcestershire (0pts) by nine wickets

The visitors Gloucestershire Gladiators recorded an easy victory at New Road as Worcestershire scored only 100 all out in their innings, Stephen Moore top-scoring with only 23. Martyn Ball took three for 24, but all the bowlers got wickets, and Mark Alleyne conceded only six runs in four overs. Although they lost Craig Spearman with the score on 22, the Gladiators knocked off their target easily, with nine wickets and five overs to spare. (Cricinfo scorecard)

=== Northamptonshire v Worcestershire (5 July) ===
Match abandoned; Northamptonshire (1pt), Worcestershire (1pt)

No play was possible at The County Ground, Northampton due to rain, and the hosts Northamptonshire Steelbacks qualified for the quarter-finals thanks to the no-result. (Cricinfo scorecard)

=== Worcestershire v Glamorgan (6 July) ===
Worcestershire (2pts) beat Glamorgan (0pts) by 37 runs

Both Worcestershire Royals and Glamorgan Dragons were knocked out before the last round of the Twenty20 Cup group stage, so the match at New Road was fairly academic. It did not stop Worcestershire from amassing one of the highest scores in Twenty20 Cup history with 223 for 9 – Ben Smith only taking 45 balls to smack 105 off the Glamorgan bowlers, with twelve fours and six sixes, as he lifted his career Twenty20 average from 15 to 20.62. The partnership of 149 with Graeme Hick was enough to win the match for Worcestershire, as Glamorgan never quite got the hang of Shoaib Akhtar – who bowled two overs for 14 with a no-ball and a wide. Glamorgan ended up only losing five wickets, but 224 was always too much to ask, and they finished with a total 186 for 5. (Cricinfo scorecard)

=== Worcestershire v Yorkshire (8–11 July) ===
Yorkshire (20pts) beat Worcestershire (4pts) by three wickets

Yorkshire closed the gap to the promotion spots from 6.5 to 1.5 points after a three-wicket win at New Road over Worcestershire. Matthew Hoggard got a good return to form after being smashed out of the Twenty20 format with an economy rate of 11, taking three for 68 in Worcestershire's first innings, yet the hosts made 345 before being bowled out shortly before stumps on day 1. Rich Pyrah, playing his first first-class game of the season, and Craig White then rescued Yorkshire from 113 for 4 with fifties, but Nadeem Malik and Kabir Ali finished with three wickets each to get them all out for 300, trailing by 45. Then, Tim Bresnan took two early wickets before stumps, and continued on day three to end with career-best figures of five for 42. However, another England prospect, Kabir Ali, took four more wickets, as Yorkshire were 222 for 6 overnight – needing 46 runs to win. They lost wicket-keeper Ismail Dawood early, but were not pegged back further, and Richard Dawson made 51 not out to lead them to the target. Worcestershire were also docked two points for a slow over rate. (Cricinfo scorecard)

=== Worcestershire v Glamorgan (17 July) ===
Glamorgan (4pts) beat Worcestershire (0pts) by five wickets

Worcestershire Royals would be ruing lost opportunities after the game with Glamorgan Dragons at New Road. Winning the toss and batting first, captain Vikram Solanki paired up for 91 with Stephen Moore, who would go on to make 104. Zander de Bruyn also made an unbeaten fifty to lift Worcestershire to 273 for 3. The Indian international Sourav Ganguly was the only Glamorga bowler to come out with some credit, as he got one wicket for 19 in his five overs. Worcestershire started creditably, snaring the wicket of Robert Croft in the second over, but Glamorgan sent out another pinch-hitter in Alex Wharf who made 38 before he was bowled bu David Leatherdale who took two for 35. However, Sourav Ganguly with 53, Michael Powell with 82, and David Hemp with an unbeaten 51 off 36 balls chased down the target. The Glamorgan batsman took a particular liking to England Test spinner Gareth Batty who finished wicketless for 69 runs. (Cricinfo scorecard)

=== Northamptonshire v Worcestershire (20–23 July) ===
Northamptonshire (19pts) beat Worcestershire (6.5pts) by 82 runs

Worcestershire's fast bowler Shoaib Akhtar had a field day despite serving up no balls on the first day at Northampton, but that was only the first day, and Northamptonshire came back to win the game. The match had started well enough for the hosts Northamptonshire, but a menacing spell from the Pakistani fast bowler reduced them from 150 for 2 to 173 for 8 – Matt Mason helping out with two wickets as well. Shoaib finished with six for 47, including twenty runs conceded due to no-balls – while Monty Panesar and Jason Brown rescued the hosts to 299 with a last-wicket stand of 62. Young wicket-keeper Steve Davies then made a career-best 95 in his sixth first-class game, which helped lift Worcestershire to 381, a lead of 82.

Northamptonshire lost six wickets to spinners in their second innings, Ray Price and Gareth Batty taking three each while Shoaib was expensive, conceding 67 in thirteen overs, as Northamptonshire were bowled out for 364 – Bilal Shafayat making 84 and Riki Wessels 102. Chasing 283 to win, Worcestershire got off to a good start with an opening partnership of 54, but Northamptonshire's spinner Monty Panesar took three for 47 to leave them 139 for 5 overnight, Ben Smith unbeaten on 50. Smith only added seven to that score, while Panesar took three more wickets, bowling 26.5 overs in one straight spell which yielded six for 77. Johann Louw and Brown also got one wicket each, as Worcestershire succumbed for 200 to suffer their third successive Championship loss, which sent them out of the promotion zone. Worcestershire were also deducted half a point for a slow over rate. (Cricinfo scorecard)

=== Gloucestershire v Worcestershire (24 July) ===
Worcestershire (4pts) beat Gloucestershire (0pts) by 20 runs (D/L method)

Despite being strengthened by their new acquisition from the West Indies, Ramnaresh Sarwan, Gloucestershire Gladiators still went down at Bristol. Having been put in to bat by Worcestershire Royals after rain delayed the start, Kabir Ali dug out a wicket with his first ball, and despite 51 from Matthew Windows Gloucestershire still only posted 168 for 9. In reply, Vikram Solanki and Stephen Moore batted 12.4 overs without loss before rain intervened, and Worcestershire were then 20 runs ahead of their Duckworth/Lewis target. (Cricinfo scorecard)

=== Hampshire v Worcestershire (26 July) ===
Match abandoned without a ball bowled; Hampshire (2pts), Worcestershire (2pts)

At Rose Bowl, Southampton it was not possible to play cricket due to rain, and the two teams Hampshire Hawks and Worcestershire Royals walked away with two points each. (Cricinfo scorecard)

=== Worcestershire v Australians (30 July-1 August) ===
Match drawn

The first day only allowed one over of play, after Vikram Solanki sent Australia in to bat and Justin Langer hit a four off Kabir Ali. On the second day, Langer and Matthew Hayden accumulated 110 for the first wicket, and runs just kept flowing as the Australians made 402 in a day – Brad Haddin top-scoring with 94, Jason Gillespie making an unbeaten 53 including two sixes, while Nadeem Malik got the best bowling figures three wickets for 78. Ali, meanwhile, was punished, to end with 124 conceded runs in 20 overs.

Worcestershire got off to a good start on the final day, Stephen Moore and Solanki making 85 for the fourth wicket after Jason Gillespie shook the top order early on. However, Michael Kasprowicz took four quick wickets as Worcestershire imploded from 133 for 3 to 151 for 9, while a bit of late order slogging from James Pipe and Malik sent the score to 187. Malik was last out, caught and bowled by Kasprowicz to complete the Australian's five-wicket-haul and mark the end of the Worcestershire innings. Australian captain Ricky Ponting opted for batting practice, and the Australians made 168 for 2 before stumps, Ponting scoring an unbeaten 59 while Michael Clarke, who was promoted to opener, also repaired a first-innings failure, making 59 off 55 balls before being run out. (Cricinfo scorecard)

=== Worcestershire v Northamptonshire (2 August) ===
Northamptonshire (4pts) beat Worcestershire (0pts) by 38 runs

Usman Afzaal scored 117 off just 103 balls as Northamptonshire Steelbacks ploughed their way to 275 for 4, Afzaal pairing up with Martin Love for the second wicket for a partnership that was worth 155 runs. The Royals' innings struggled from the outset, when Stephen Moore was dismissed for a duck, and despite 52 from Graeme Hick, Worcestershire imploded to 185 for 9 at one point, with Bilal Shafayat taking four for 33 with medium-pace bowling. In the final overs, Shoaib Akhtar had some hitting fun at the end, scoring 36 off 17 balls in vain as Worcestershire ended on 237 for 9. (Cricinfo scorecard)

=== Worcestershire v Northamptonshire (4–7 August) ===
Northamptonshire (17pts) beat Worcestershire (3pts) by 137 runs

Worcestershire gave away the initiative in the second innings, losing by 137 runs thanks to a frantic second-innings 190 from David Sales. It was the visitors, Northamptonshire, who chose to bat first at New Road, and after seeing off Shoaib Akhtar and Kabir Ali in a frantic opening spell where Bilal Shafayat went for 1, Northamptonshire looked fairly confident at 177 for 4. Then Shoaib returned, taking four wickets (to end with bowling figures of 9.2–1–55–5), and the wheels fell off as Northamptonshire lost their last six wickets for 12 runs. Stephen Moore continued his fine form, making 62, as Worcestershire looked to gain a slender lead – Ben Phillips taking a couple of wickets to give Northamptonshire some hope of tying the hosts down. Then, Damien Wright ripped through with some quick wickets, as Worcestershire went from 110 for 3 to 147 for 8 – only for Shoaib and Matthew Mason to give Worcestershire the lead thanks to a boundary-filled 47-run partnership.

Ali and Mason then chipped away at the Northamptonshire batsmen, and would have fancied their chances when the visitors were 64 for 5. However, a quickfire partnership between Sales and Wright turned the match on its head again, as the pair added 188 runs in 112 minutes – one run less than Northamptonshire had managed in the entire first innings – to send Northamptonshire into a relatively big lead on this pitch. Sales was 152 not out overnight, and powered on to 190 before Malik had him caught. However, the damage was done, and Worcestershire faced a steep target of 360 to win – or five sessions for a draw. Losing Moore and Graeme Hick early on, Ben Smith attacked for a fine 92, and a 45-minute flurry of runs from Zander de Bruyn gave Worcestershire some hope at 154 for 3. However, Monty Panesar got four for 40, Phillips dug out three for 56, Worcestershire lost the last seven wickets for 68 runs, and whimpered into a heap. Worcestershire were later docked one point due to a slow over rate. (Cricinfo scorecard)

=== Worcestershire v Somerset (16–19 August) ===
Worcestershire (22pts) beat Somerset (4pts) by an innings and 56 runs

Somerset were bowled out for 318 on the first day at New Road, but for the efforts of Malaysian Arul Suppiah (who made 72), wicket-keeper Carl Gazzard (74) and the 18-year-old debutant from Taunton, Robert Woodman (46 not out), it would have been far worse. The Worcestershire bowlers shared out the wickets, and Somerset were in real trouble at 57 for 5, but Suppiah stayed calm and the lower order made good contributions. Nadeem Malik got the best figures for Worcestershire, with three for 63.

However, Somerset's bowling left something to be desired. After an opening stand of 51, Worcestershire powered onwards, with number three Zander de Bruyn smashing 28 fours in a four-hour 161. Ben Smith and Steve Davies also got centuries, as Worcestershire at one point were 618 for 3. Three wickets from Keith Parsons set them back, but Worcestershire could still declaration and forfeiture declare on 696 for 8. Suppiah started well once again, making 34 in a 110-run partnership with Matthew Wood as Somerset made their way to 138 for 1. Then spinners Ray Price and Gareth Batty shared the next seven wickets for 70 runs, and Somerset imploded to 209 for 8 while still needing 169 to avoid the innings defeat. A good rearguard from number eight Carl Gazzard, and his partners Andy Caddick and Simon Francis saw Somerset first past 250 and then past 300. They looked to make Worcestershire bat again when Kabir Ali had Francis bowled – his only wicket of the innings, as he finished with expensive figures of 8.5–0–50–1. Batty and Price bowled 87 of Worcestershire's total of 108.5 overs, and Price's 44 overs included 21 maidens. (Cricinfo scorecard)

=== Worcestershire v Hampshire (22 August) ===
Hampshire (4pts) beat Worcestershire (0pts) by four wickets

Hampshire Hawks got the four points from a closely fought match at New Road. Worcestershire Royals had won the toss and chosen to bat, and their innings was shortened to 34 overs out of a scheduled 45 due to rain. Wickets fell regularly, four batsmen being dismissed with scores in the thirties, and the final score of 185 for 7 did not look too threatening. John Crawley and Shane Watson put Hampshire back on track after two early wickets from Kabir Ali shook them, but an economical spell from Ray Price which yielded two wickets was nearly enough. However, the other spinner Gareth Batty was not nearly as economical, and Greg Lamb took him for runs to end with 16 not out and win the game for Hampshire.

=== Lancashire v Worcestershire (24 August) ===
Worcestershire (4pts) beat Lancashire (0pts) by four wickets

Chris Gayle, Worcestershire's new overseas player after Shoaib Akhtar left to play in the 2005 Afro-Asian Cup, helped Worcestershire Royals to an important victory in the National League, while Lancashire Lightning suffered their third one-day defeat in five days. Having won the toss and batted, Lancashire regularly lost wickets, and the innings of Australian Marcus North was symptomatic – he made a 19-ball 2. Stuart Law, however, scored 82, and was along with Glen Chapple the only batsman to really keep up the scoring rate. Lancashire could only muster a total of 195 for 9, and defending that target quickly became difficult ash Gayle slashed eight fours and a six on his way to a 41-ball 53. Despite Chapple's returns of 9–0–23–4 and Anderson taking two for 47, Worcestershire made it to the target with four wickets and 5.3 overs in hand. (Cricinfo scorecard)

=== Lancashire v Worcestershire (25–28 August) ===
Lancashire (22pts) beat Worcestershire (6pts) by an innings and 73 runs

Lancashire recorded an innings victory at Stanley Park in Blackpool against Worcestershire to go second in the Division Two table of the County Championship. Mal Loye and Stuart Law made centuries in the first innings, which became a very difficult one for the Worcestershire bowlers. On the second day, Worcestershire finally got some breakthroughs, as Loye was dismissed for 187 and North for 60, and Lancashire could declare with a total of 562 for 8. Chris Gayle played an innings in typical fashion, hitting eight fours from 25 deliveries before he was bowled by Dominic Cork for 43. Cork also got Graeme Hick for a duck, as Worcestershire closed the second day on 111 for 3. Ben Smith and Vikram Solanki fought back, however, pairing up for 140 for the fourth wicket, and Worcestershire looked confident of avoiding the follow-on with the score on 330 for 4. However, two wickets from Andrew Symonds and three from James Anderson ended the Worcestershire effort for 376, still trailing by 186.

Mark Chilton enforced the follow on, and things went from bad to worse for the visitors. No batsman passed 25, Glen Chapple got four wickets for Lancashire, and by the close Worcestershire were 112 for 9 – needing 72 to avoid an innings defeat. However, with the tenth ball of the fourth day Chapple dismissed Kabir Ali to end with five for 32, and Warwickshire were all out for 113. (Cricinfo scorecard)

=== Worcestershire v Leicestershire (30 August-2 September) ===
Leicestershire (12pts) drew with Worcestershire (9pts)

Opener John Maunders batted for four hours for his first century of the first class season, and a further two hours to make a total of 148, which helped Leicestershire to a solid total of 407 at New Road – yet the slow nature of his batting meant there was little time to force a victory. Paul Nixon also hit a three-hour fifty for Leicestershire, while Kabir Ali got the best bowling figures with four for 95, including nine no-balls and one wide. Spinners Ray Price and Chris Gayle took a total of five wickets in their 32.1 overs, while both Shoaib Akhtar and Gareth Batty went wicketless. Worcestershire's batsmen all got starts, but not much more, and David Masters dug out both openers to end with three for 49 as Worcestershire were all out for 290 – Claude Henderson taking care of the last four wickets with nine balls, to end with four for 72 in the innings.

Leicestershire lost both openers to Kabir Ali who took three wickets at a cost of more than five runs an over as Aftab Habib and Tom New hit plenty of runs off him. Habib made 90, as Leicestershire declared on 255 for 5, setting Worcestershire 371 in five hours, but the chase was halted by bad light. When it finally got underway, Worcestershire crashed to 87 for 4 after two wickets from Charl Willoughby, but fifties from Ben Smith and Gareth Batty saved the draw for Worcestershire. (Cricinfo scorecard)

=== Worcestershire v Gloucestershire (4 September) ===
Worcestershire (4pts) beat Gloucestershire (0pts) by eight wickets

A menacing spell from Shoaib Akhtar, who got six wickets for 16 runs, including the first five as Gloucestershire crashed to 22 for 5, left Gloucestershire Gladiators without any hope in the bottom-fight at New Road, Worcester. Akhtar's bowling analysis was the best in the National League all season. After Akhtar was taken off, Malinga Bandara and Mark Alleyne set about trying to bat out fifty overs, but Alleyne was caught by Worcestershire Royals' Vikram Solanki and Kabir Ali cleaned up the tail with two wickets as Gloucestershire were all out for 105. Bandara then got the wickets of Stephen Moore and Vikram Solanki with successive deliveries, but Chris Gayle guided the hosts home with an unbeaten 53 off 70 balls, as Worcestershire won with more than 20 overs to spare. (Cricinfo scorecard)

=== Yorkshire v Worcestershire (7–10 September) ===
Yorkshire (10pts) drew with Worcestershire (8pts)

Rain wrecked the match at Headingley, a match which would probably have ended in a result if the normal 400 overs of play were possible instead of the 221.4 actually available. Although no batsman passed 50, Worcestershire accumulated 308 in 85 overs. Tim Bresnan took three wickets for 45 with his pace, while Australian Mark Cleary, playing in his first game for Yorkshire after a season with Leicestershire in 2004, had to be content with one man – Pakistani bowler Shoaib Akhtar – while conceding 70. Anthony McGrath batted almost without support in Yorkshire's first innings, but his five-hour unbeaten 173 sent Yorkshire to a total of 317, despite struggling at 190 for 7 before Richard Dawson stepped in to make 49. Kabir Ali took four for 79 for Worcestershire, Nadeem Malik got three and Gareth Batty two, but they couldn't prevent the hosts racking up a nine-run lead.

Worcestershire were then shaken by South African Deon Kruis who took the first three wickets in a frantic last session. Worcestershire hit at nearly a run a ball, ending the day with 126 off 24 overs, but lost four wickets in the process. Only 40 overs of play were possible on the third day, as Australians Cleary and Ian Harvey bowled Worcestershire out for 211. Yorkshire set about chasing 203 at a rapid pace, losing Matthew Wood and Joe Sayers but still making 125 for 2 in 25 overs before rain set in, shortening the day's play to five overs and ruining Yorkshire's chances as they needed 78 more with 8 wickets in hand. Worcestershire were later docked two points for a slow over rate. (Cricinfo scorecard)

=== Nottinghamshire v Worcestershire (11 September) ===
Nottinghamshire (4pts) beat Worcestershire (0pts) by five wickets

Despite little help from the rest of the batting line-up, Ben Smith with 58 and Steven Davies and 43 gave Worcestershire Royals a total of 200, after Nottinghamshire Outlaws' Ryan Sidebottom had bowled four maiden overs and limited the scoring. Worcestershire made it to 200 for 9, however, but with Stephen Fleming making 73 in his first match for Nottinghamshire following the tour of Zimbabwe with the New Zealand team, Nottinghamshire made it to the target with five wickets in hand, despite Kabir Ali and Ray Price taking two wickets each. (Cricinfo scorecard)

=== Essex v Worcestershire (18 September) ===
Essex (4pts) beat Worcestershire (0pts) by four wickets

Essex Eagles continued on their winning ways with their twelfth National League victory of the season, taking a win in the last over thanks to a 78-run stand between Grant Flower and Ravinder Bopara. However, it was Worcestershire Royals who won the toss and batted first, Stephen Moore and Vikram Solanki (coming in for Chris Gayle who retired hurt) adding 103 for the first wicket. Gayle returned when Solanki was dismissed, hitting 44, and 25 from Ben Smith helped Worcestershire to 227 for 5. Andre Adams took three wickets as Worcestershire lost four for one solitary run, but Smith hung in there with number 11 Nadeem Malik and ensured a total of 240 for 9. Essex lost captain Ronnie Irani for nine early on, but a stroke-filled half-century from Alastair Cook sent Essex to 135 for 3, and Grant Flower then hit four sixes to complete a run-a-ball 81. Despite two late wickets from Kabir Ali, Bopara saw Essex home with five deliveries to spare to finish on 46 not out. (Cricinfo scorecard)

=== Worcestershire v Essex (21–24 September) ===
Worcestershire (11pts) drew with Essex (10pts)

A total of 19 wickets fell in four days at New Road, despite only half a day being lost to rain. Batting first, Essex made 574 despite Stuart Wedge taking five for 112 in his second first class game, getting Ravinder Bopara as his first wicket. Essex got two early wickets; first class debutant Jahid Ahmed got his first wicket by removing 21-year-old Daryl Mitchell for 6, and Andre Adams bowled Graeme Hick, but Worcestershire's third-wicket partnership added 333, with Stephen Moore hitting 152 out of his 191 runs in boundaries. However, Worcestershire declared overnight on 424 for 3, and Essex scored 201 for one wicket in 36 overs, Alastair Cook rounding off his first season as an Essex regular with an unbeaten 117. Worcestershire were set 352 in 60 overs to win, and despite an 84-ball ton from Graeme Hick Worcestershire finished four runs short of the ten extra points a win would have given. (Cricinfo scorecard)

=== Worcestershire v Lancashire (25 September) ===
Lancashire (4pts) beat Worcestershire (0pts) by 75 runs

Lancashire Lightning ensured continued survival in Division One of the National League with a victory over Worcestershire Royals in a rain-shortened match that was cut down from 45 to 33 overs. David Leatherdale and Gareth Batty took early wickets, as Lancashire lost their first four wickets for 65 runs, but Glen Chapple and Stuart Law added 84 for the fifth wicket, and Kyle Hogg also provided quick runs as Lancashire ended on 186 for 8. The six Lancashire bowlers then shared out wickets, as James Anderson ended with three for 12 including England batsman Vikram Solanki, while spinners Murali Kartik and Andrew Symonds took two each as Worcestershire were bowled out for 111. No Worcestershire batsman passed 25, and thus Worcestershire fell down into Division Two. (Cricinfo scorecard)
