= South African cricket team in England in 2003 =

	South Africa	England
- Dates: 20 June – 8 September 2003
Captains	Graeme Smith	Nasser Hussain (1st Test); Michael Vaughan (2nd–5th Tests; ODIs)

Test series
- Result: 5-match series drawn 2–2
Most runs	Graeme Smith (714)	Marcus Trescothick (487)
Most wickets	Makhaya Ntini (23)	James Anderson (15)
- Player of the series: Andrew Flintoff (Eng) and Graeme Smith (SA)

The South African cricket team toured England in the 2003 season to play a five-match Test series against England. The two teams also took part in a triangular One Day International tournament involving Zimbabwe.

The Test series was drawn 2-2, with the first match resulted in a draw, while the triangular series was won by England, after beating South Africa in the final by 7 wickets.

== Tour matches ==
=== 50-over: Sussex v South Africans ===
20 June 2003
Scorecard

South Africans; 267/7 (50 overs)	v	Sussex; 114 (30.5 overs)
Boeta Dippenaar 101* (90); Robin Martin-Jenkins 2/34 (10 overs)		Chris Adams 32 (54); Paul Adams 3/19 (6 overs)

South Africans won by 153 runs
County Ground, Hove
Umpires: Rob Bailey (Eng) and George Sharp (Eng)

- South Africans won the toss and elected to bat.

=== 50-over: Northamptonshire v South Africans ===
22 June 2003
Scorecard

South Africans; 229/6 (50 overs)	v	Northamptonshire; 45/1 (15 overs)
Mark Boucher 69 (89); Mike Cawdron 2/36 (10 overs)		Michael Hussey 27* (45)

No result
County Ground, Northampton
Umpires: Peter Hartley (Eng) and Allan Jones (Eng)

- South Africans won the toss and elected to bat.

=== 50-over: Worcestershire v South Africans ===
25 June 2003
Scorecard

South Africans; 261/4 (50 overs)	v	Worcestershire; 192 (45 overs)
Jacques Kallis 66 (103); Kabir Ali 2/49 (10 overs)		Justin Kemp 77 (87); Alan Dawson 4/26 (8 overs)

South Africans won by 69 runs
New Road, Worcester
Umpires: Nigel Cowley (Eng) and Ian Gould (Eng)

- South Africans won the toss and elected to bat.
- Shaftab Khalid (Worcs) made his List A debut.

=== First-class: Somerset v South Africans ===
15–17 July 2003
Scorecard

South Africans	v	Somerset
326/4d (78 overs); Graeme Smith 152 (214); Keith Parsons 1/23 (8 overs)		245/7d (51 overs); Matt Wood 55 (88); Monde Zondeki 5/64 (11 overs)
245/4d (66 overs); Neil McKenzie 82* (129); Keith Parsons 1/37 (10 overs)		109/3 (25 overs); Carl Gazzard 35* (35); Monde Zondeki 1/20 (6 overs)

Match drawn
County Ground, Taunton
Umpires: John Holder (Eng) and Nigel Llong (Eng)

- South Africans won the toss and elected to bat.

=== First-class: India A v South Africans ===
19–21 July 2003
Scorecard

India A	v	South Africans
319 (89 overs); Wasim Jaffer 90 (147); Shaun Pollock 4/46 (15 overs)		463 (121.4 overs); Jacques Rudolph 83 (138); Aavishkar Salvi 4/92 (29 overs)
160/3 (43 overs); Hemang Badani 58* (85); Shaun Pollock 1/14 (6 overs)

Match drawn
Arundel Castle Cricket Ground, Arundel
Umpires: Mervyn Kitchen (Eng) and Alan Whitehead (Eng)

- India A won the toss and elected to bat.

=== First-class: Kent v South Africans ===
7–9 August 2003
Scorecard

South Africans	v	Kent
325/4d (70.3 overs); Neil McKenzie 105* (155); Alamgir Sheriyar 2/44 (15 overs)		235 (73.2 overs); Alex Loudon 63 (140); Robin Peterson 3/58 (16.2 overs)
243/7d (55 overs); Boeta Dippenaar 69 (90); James Tredwell 3/75 (17 overs)		232 (68.5 overs); Michael Carberry 75 (146); Paul Adams 9/79 (22.5 overs)

South Africans won by 101 runs
St Lawrence Ground, Canterbury
Umpires: Richard Illingworth (Eng) and George Sharp (Eng)

- South Africans won the toss and elected to bat.

=== First-class: Derbyshire v South Africans ===
28–30 August 2003
Scorecard

South Africans	v	Derbyshire
460/7d (113.1 overs); Jacques Kallis 200 (305); Paul Havell 4/129 (29 overs)		136/4d (48 overs); Luke Sutton 46* (71); Charl Willoughby 3/31 (14 overs)

Match drawn
County Ground, Derby
Umpires: Nigel Cowley (Eng) and John Steele (Eng)

- South Africans won the toss and elected to bat.
- No play was possible on Day 1

== NatWest Series (ODI) ==
=== 2nd Match: England v South Africa ===
28 June
Scorecard

South Africa; 264/6 (50 overs)	v	England; 265/4 (45.5 overs)
Jacques Kallis 107 (133); Andrew Flintoff 3/46 (10 overs)		Marcus Trescothick 114 (125); Makhaya Ntini 2/56 (10 overs)

England won by 6 wickets
The Oval, London
Umpires: David Shepherd (Eng) and Simon Taufel (Aus)
Player of the match: Vikram Solanki (Eng)

- South Africa won the toss and elected to bat.

=== 3rd Match: South Africa v Zimbabwe ===
29 June
Scorecard

South Africa; 272/5 (50 overs)	v	Zimbabwe; 226/9 (50 overs)
Jacques Kallis 125* (147); Douglas Hondo 2/29 (9.1 overs)		Travis Friend 82 (93); Andrew Hall 3/38 (9 overs)

South Africa won by 46 runs
St Lawrence Ground, Canterbury
Umpires: Billy Bowden (NZ) and Neil Mallender (Eng)
Player of the match: Jacques Kallis (SA)

- Zimbabwe won the toss and elected to field.

=== 5th Match: England v South Africa ===
3 July
Scorecard

England; 223/7 (50 overs)	v	South Africa; 227/3 (47.3 overs)
Marcus Trescothick 60 (92); Makhaya Ntini 3/38 (8 overs)		Jacques Kallis 82* (105); Andrew Flintoff 1/33 (9.3 overs)

South Africa won by 7 wickets
Old Trafford, Manchester
Umpires: Billy Bowden (NZ) and Neil Mallender (Eng)
Player of the match: Jacques Kallis (SA)

- England won the toss and elected to bat.

=== 6th Match: South Africa v Zimbabwe ===
5 July
Scorecard

Zimbabwe; 174/8 (50 overs)	v	South Africa; 175/1 (34.2 overs)
Heath Streak 54 (72); Jacques Kallis 3/47 (10 overs)		Herschelle Gibbs 93* (97); Sean Ervine 1/13 (2.2 overs)

South Africa won by 9 wickets
Sophia Gardens, Cardiff
Umpires: Simon Taufel (Aus) and Peter Willey (Eng)
Player of the match: Herschelle Gibbs (SA)

- South Africa won the toss and elected to field.

=== 8th Match: England v South Africa ===
8 July
Scorecard

South Africa; 198/9 (50 overs)	v	England; 199/6 (39 overs)
Graeme Smith 45 (39); James Anderson 4/38 (10 overs)		Michael Vaughan 83 (115); Makhaya Ntini 2/30 (6 overs)

England won by 4 wickets
Edgbaston, Birmingham
Umpires: David Shepherd (Eng) and Simon Taufel (Aus)
Player of the match: Andrew Flintoff (Eng)

- England won the toss and elected to bat.

=== 9th Match: South Africa v Zimbabwe ===
10 July
Scorecard

Zimbabwe; 173/8 (50 overs)	v	South Africa; 174/3 (35.2 overs)
Heath Streak 50* (90); Makhaya Ntini 4/45 (10 overs)		Jacques Rudolph 69* (97); Douglas Hondo 2/25 (7 overs)

South Africa won by 7 wickets
Rose Bowl, Southampton
Umpires: Billy Bowden (NZ) and David Shepherd (Eng)
Player of the match: Makhaya Ntini (SA)

- Zimbabwe won the toss and elected to bat.

=== Final: England v South Africa ===
12 July
Scorecard

South Africa; 107 (32.1 overs)	v	England; 111/3 (20.2 overs)
Jacques Rudolph 19 (40); James Anderson 3/50 (10 overs)		Vikram Solanki 50 (58); Andrew Hall 1/14 (2.2 overs)

England won by 7 wickets
Lord's, London
Umpires: Neil Mallender (Eng) and Simon Taufel (Aus)
Player of the match: Darren Gough (Eng)

- England won the toss and elected to field.

== Test series ==
=== 1st Test ===
24–28 July 2003
Scorecard

South Africa	v	England
594/5d (145 overs); Graeme Smith 277 (373); Ashley Giles 2/153 (42 overs)		408 (122.4 overs); Michael Vaughan 156 (286); Makhaya Ntini 4/114 (28 overs)
134/4d (26 overs); Graeme Smith 85 (70); Ashley Giles 2/45 (8 overs)		110/1 (34 overs); Marcus Trescothick 52* (94); Robin Peterson 1/33 (13 overs)

Match drawn
Edgbaston, Birmingham
Umpires: Daryl Harper (Aus) and Srinivasaraghavan Venkataraghavan (Ind)
Player of the match: Graeme Smith (SA)

- South Africa won the toss and elected to bat.
- No play was possible on Day 2 and play on Day 3 was reduced to 62 overs due to rain.

=== 2nd Test ===
31 July–3 August 2003
Scorecard

England	v	South Africa
173 (48.4 overs); Darren Gough 34 (48); Makhaya Ntini 5/75 (17 overs)		682/6d (177 overs); Graeme Smith 259 (370); James Anderson 2/90 (27 overs)
417 (107.1 overs); Andrew Flintoff 142 (146); Makhaya Ntini 5/145 (31 overs)

South Africa won by an innings and 92 runs
Lord's, London
Umpires: Steve Bucknor (WI) and Darrell Hair (Aus)
Player of the match: Makhaya Ntini and Graeme Smith (SA)

- South Africa won the toss and elected to field.

=== 3rd Test ===
14–18 August 2003
Scorecard

England	v	South Africa
445 (146.3 overs); Nasser Hussain 116 (251); Andrew Hall 3/88 (24 overs)		362 (119.5 overs); Neil McKenzie 90 (168); James Anderson 5/102 (27.5 overs)
118 (46.4 overs); Andrew Flintoff 30 (46); Shaun Pollock 6/39 (17.4 overs)		131 (56.2 overs); Mark Boucher 52 (91); James Kirtley 6/34 (16.2 overs)

England won by 70 runs
Trent Bridge, Nottingham
Umpires: Darrell Hair (Aus) and Daryl Harper (Aus)
Player of the match: James Kirtley (Eng)

- England won the toss and elected to bat.
- James Kirtley and Ed Smith (both Eng) made their Test debuts.

=== 4th Test ===
21–25 August 2003
Scorecard

South Africa	v	England
342 (114.4 overs); Gary Kirsten 130 (323); Kabir Ali 3/80 (22 overs)		307 (87.2 overs); Mark Butcher 77 (115); Jacques Kallis 3/38 (20.1 overs)
365 (100.5 overs); Andrew Hall 99* (87); James Kirtley 3/71 (21.5 overs)		209 (61.4 overs); Mark Butcher 61 (133); Jacques Kallis 6/54 (17 overs)

South Africa won by 191 runs
Headingley, Leeds
Umpires: Billy Bowden (NZ) and Simon Taufel (Aus)
Player of the match: Gary Kirsten (SA)

- South Africa won the toss and elected to bat.
- Kabir Ali (Eng) and Monde Zondeki (SA) made their Test debuts.

=== 5th Test ===
4–8 September 2003
Scorecard

South Africa	v	England
484 (128 overs); Herschelle Gibbs 183 (258); Martin Bicknell 2/71 (20 overs)		604/9d (162 overs); Marcus Trescothick 219 (374); Shaun Pollock 3/111 (39 overs)
229 (69.2 overs); Shaun Pollock 43 (57); Steve Harmison 4/33 (19.2 overs)		110/1 (22.2 overs); Marcus Trescothick 69* (66); Jacques Kallis 1/25 (5.2 overs)

England won by 9 wickets
The Oval, London
Umpires: Simon Taufel (Aus) and Srinivasaraghavan Venkataraghavan (Ind)
Player of the match: Marcus Trescothick (Eng)

- South Africa won the toss and elected to bat.
- Alec Stewart retired from all forms of cricket after this Test.
