= New Zealand cricket team in England in 2008 =

	England	New Zealand
- Dates: 27 April 2008 – 3 July 2008
Captains	Michael Vaughan (Tests); Paul Collingwood (ODIs and T20Is) (Note: Kevin Pietersen captained England for the 5th ODI.)	Daniel Vettori

Test series
- Result: England won the 3-match series 2–0
Most runs	Andrew Strauss (266)	Ross Taylor (243)
Most wickets	James Anderson (19)	Daniel Vettori (12)
- Player of the series: Andrew Strauss (Eng); Daniel Vettori (NZ)

One Day International series
- Results: New Zealand won the 5-match series 3–1
Most runs	Owais Shah (199)	Scott Styris (197)
Most wickets	Paul Collingwood (7)	Tim Southee (13)
- Player of the series: Tim Southee (NZ)

Twenty20 International series
- Results: England won the 1-match series 1–0
Most runs	Ian Bell (60)	Ross Taylor (25)
Most wickets	James Anderson; Stuart Broad; Graeme Swann (2)	Michael Mason (1)
- Player of the series: Ian Bell (Eng)

The New Zealand national cricket team toured England and Scotland during the northern summer of 2008. They played three Test matches and five One Day Internationals and one Twenty20 International against England. Although New Zealand lost the Test series 2–0, they triumphed in the ODI series, winning three matches and losing one. The only Twenty20 match saw an England victory.

== Test series ==
=== 1st Test ===
15–19 May
Scorecard

New Zealand	v	England
277 (86.2 overs); Brendon McCullum 97 (97); Ryan Sidebottom 4/55 (28.2 overs)		319 (113.3 overs); Michael Vaughan 106 (214); Daniel Vettori 5/69 (22.3 overs)
269/6 (86.2 overs); Jacob Oram 101 (121); James Anderson 2/64 (19.0 overs)

Match drawn
Lord's Cricket Ground, London
Umpires: Steve Bucknor (WI) and Simon Taufel (Aus)
Player of the match: Daniel Vettori (NZ)

- England won the toss and elected to field.
- Rain shortened Day 1 and Day 2. On Day 3 only 40 minutes of cricket was played and at 17:15 play was officially called off. The final day ended at 17:00 due to bad light.

=== 2nd Test ===
23–27 May
Scorecard

New Zealand	v	England
381 (90.3 overs); Ross Taylor 154* (176); James Anderson 4/118 (20.3 overs)		202 (83.3 overs); Andrew Strauss 60 (140); Daniel Vettori 5/66 (31 overs)
114 (41.2 overs); Jamie How 29 (39); Monty Panesar 6/37 (17 overs)		294/4 (88 overs); Andrew Strauss 106 (186); Chris Martin 1/45 (13 overs)

England won by 6 wickets
Old Trafford Cricket Ground, Manchester
Umpires: Darrell Hair (Aus) and Simon Taufel (Aus)
Player of the match: Monty Panesar (Eng)

- New Zealand won the toss and elected to bat.
- Bad light ended day 1 early.

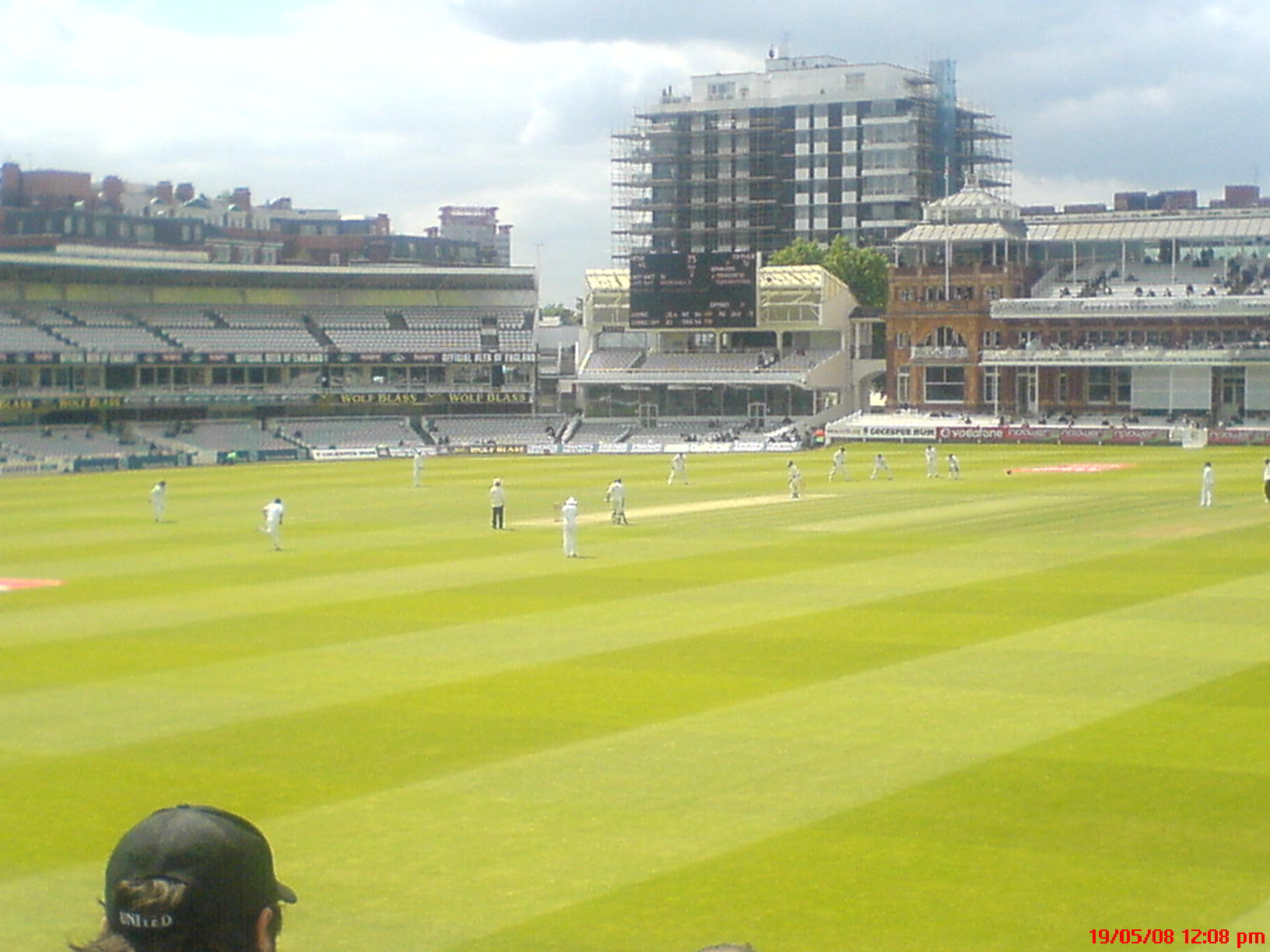
James Anderson bowls a maiden at Ross Taylor on the morning of the fifth day.

=== 3rd Test ===
5–9 June
Scorecard

England	v	New Zealand
364 (126.5 overs); Kevin Pietersen 115 (223); Iain O'Brien 4/74 (23 overs)		123 (46.3 overs); Jamie How 40 (79); James Anderson 7/43 (21.3 overs)
		232 (72.3 overs) (f/o); Brendon McCullum 71 (126); Ryan Sidebottom 6/67 (16 overs)

England won by an innings and 9 runs
Trent Bridge, Nottingham
Umpires: Steve Bucknor (WI) and Darrell Hair (Aus)
Player of the match: James Anderson (Eng)

- New Zealand won the toss and elected to field.
- Bad light ended day 2 early. Start to day 3 was delayed due to rain.

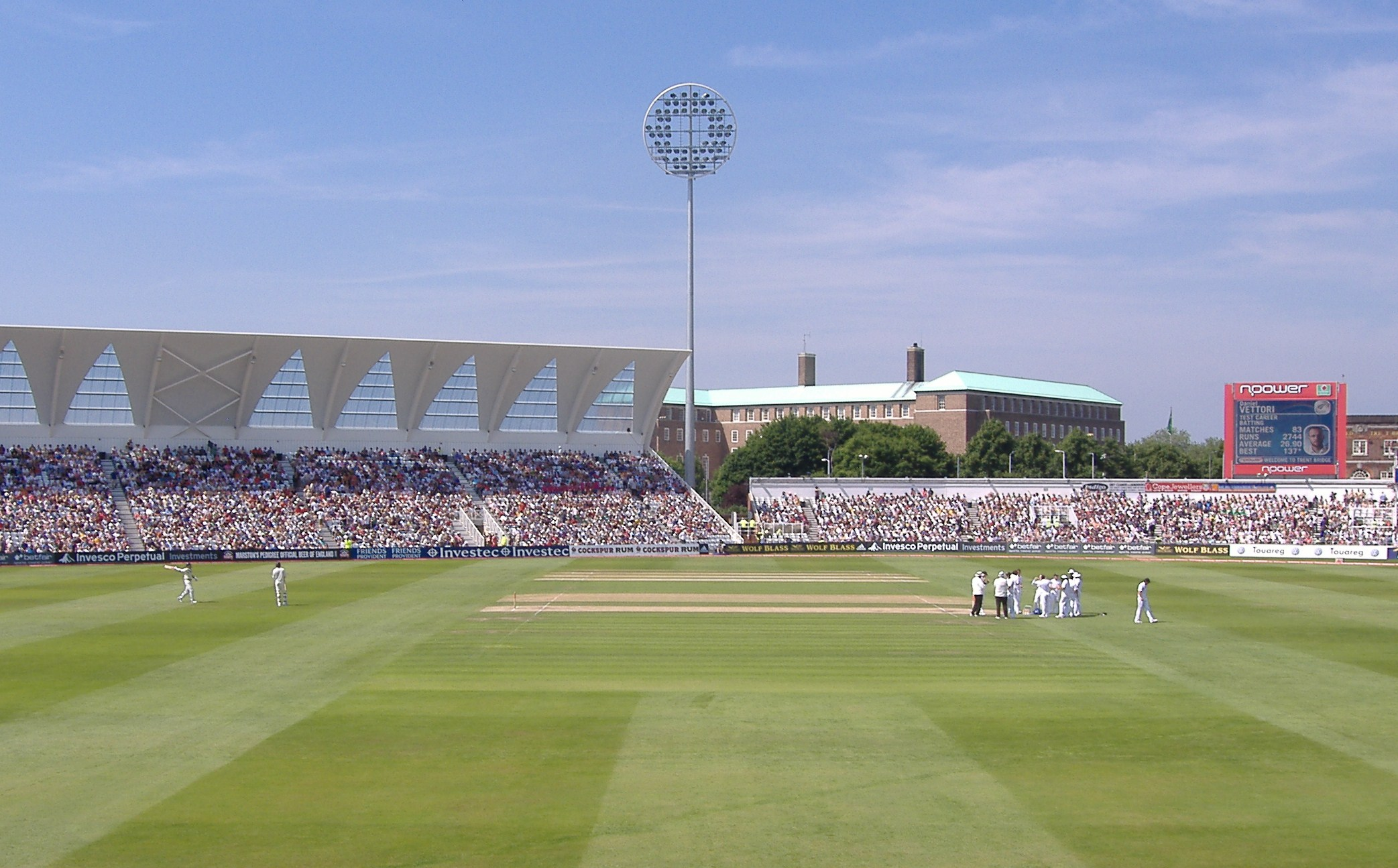
England celebrate after taking the sixth wicket in New Zealand's second innings.

== T20I series ==
=== Only T20I ===
13 June
Scorecard

New Zealand; 123/9 (20 overs)	v	England; 127/1 (17.3 overs)
Ross Taylor 25 (18); Graeme Swann 2/21 (4 overs)		Ian Bell 60* (46); Michael Mason 1/18 (3 overs)

England won by 9 wickets
Old Trafford, Manchester
Umpires: Ian Gould (Eng) and Peter Hartley (Eng)
Player of the match: Ian Bell (Eng)

- England won the toss and elected to field.

== ODI series ==
=== 1st ODI ===
15 June
Scorecard

England; 307/5 (50 overs)	v	New Zealand; 193 (42.5 overs)
Kevin Pietersen 110* (112); Daniel Vettori 1/38 (10 overs)		Brendon McCullum 36 (27); Paul Collingwood 4/15 (2.5 overs)

England won by 114 runs
Riverside Ground, Chester-le-Street
Umpires: Steve Davis (Aus) and Nigel Llong (Eng)
Player of the match: Kevin Pietersen (Eng)

- New Zealand won the toss and elected to field.

=== 2nd ODI ===
18 June
Scorecard

England; 162 (24 overs)	v	New Zealand; 127/2 (19 overs)
Luke Wright 52 (38); Grant Elliott 3/23 (5 overs)		Brendon McCullum 60* (51); Paul Collingwood 1/23 (4 overs)

No result
Edgbaston, Birmingham
Umpires: Steve Davis (Aus) and Ian Gould (Eng)

- New Zealand won the toss and elected to field.
- The game started late because of rain and was reduced to 24 overs by the Duckworth-Lewis method. Then at 7:30 pm it was called off completely due to rain with only one more over needed to constitute a game. Under the Duckworth-Lewis method, New Zealand required just 7 runs to win if the game had gone one more over.

=== 3rd ODI ===
21 June
Scorecard

New Zealand; 182 (50 overs)	v	England; 160 (46.2 overs)
Grant Elliott 56 (102); James Anderson 3/61 (10 overs)		Paul Collingwood 34 (80); Tim Southee 4/38 (10 overs)

New Zealand won by 22 runs
County Ground, Bristol
Umpires: Steve Davis (Aus) and Peter Hartley (Eng)
Player of the match: Kyle Mills (NZ)

- England won the toss and elected to field.

=== 4th ODI ===
25 June
Scorecard

England; 245 (49.4 overs)	v	New Zealand; 246/9 (50 overs)
Owais Shah 63 (71); Tim Southee 3/47 (10 overs)		Scott Styris 69 (87); Graeme Swann 2/49 (10 overs)

New Zealand won by 1 wicket
The Oval, London
Umpires: Mark Benson (Eng) and Steve Davis (Aus)
Player of the match: Scott Styris (NZ)

- New Zealand won the toss and elected to field.

The fourth ODI was marred with controversy. Paul Collingwood appealed a controversial run out of Grant Elliott after Elliott had collided with Ryan Sidebottom and injured himself. While this action initially drew criticism from the New Zealand dressing room, Daniel Vettori admitted during the post-game press conference that the Black Caps' reaction was "a little bit over the top" Collingwood also admitted that he probably made the wrong decision in not withdrawing the appeal. Later, the ICC banned Collingwood for four ODI matches due to England's slow over rate, with England having bowled only 47 overs in the required time. The ICC also fined the rest of the English team 15% of their match fee. Kevin Pietersen was called upon to take over as captain for the final game.

=== 5th ODI ===
28 June
Scorecard

New Zealand; 266/5 (50 overs)	v	England; 215 (47.5 overs)
Scott Styris 87* (91); Graeme Swann 2/33 (10 overs)		Owais Shah 69 (75); Daniel Vettori 3/32 (10 overs)

New Zealand won by 51 runs
Lord's, London
Umpires: Steve Davis (Aus) and Nigel Llong (Eng)
Player of the match: Scott Styris (NZ)

- England won the toss and elected to field.

== Other ODIs ==
=== New Zealand v Ireland ===
1 July
Scorecard

New Zealand; 402/2 (50 overs)	v	Ireland; 112 (28.3 overs)
Brendon McCullum 166 (135); Phil Eaglestone 1/60 (7 overs)		Peter Connell 22* (26); Tim Southee 3/23 (6 overs)

New Zealand won by 290 runs
Mannofield Park, Aberdeen, Scotland
Umpires: Paul Baldwin (Ger) and Steve Davis (Aus)

- Ireland won the toss and elected to field.
- New Zealand's 290 run win over Ireland is a new world record for the biggest margin of victory by runs. The previous world record was India's 257 run drubbing of Bermuda in the 2007 Cricket World Cup.

=== New Zealand v Scotland ===
3 July
Scorecard

Scotland; 101 (33.2 overs)	v	New Zealand; 102/2 (14.4 overs)
Qasim Sheikh 18 (43); Grant Elliott 3/14 (7 overs)		Ross Taylor 61* (41); Dewald Nel 1/34 (6 overs)

New Zealand won by 8 wickets
Mannofield Park, Aberdeen, Scotland
Umpires: Paul Baldwin (Ger) and Steve Davis (Aus)

- New Zealand won the toss and elected to field.

== Tour matches ==
=== List A: Marylebone Cricket Club v New Zealanders ===
27 April
Scorecard

New Zealanders; 239/7 (47 overs)	v	Marylebone Cricket Club; 44/2 (9 overs)
Aaron Redmond 72 (117); Rob Nicol 2/32 (5 overs)		Richard Montgomerie 20 (29); Mark Gillespie 2/26 (5 overs)

No result
Arundel Castle, Arundel
Umpires: Stephen Gayle (Eng) and Jeremy Lloyds (Eng)

- Marylebone Cricket Club won the toss and elected to field.

=== First-class: Kent v New Zealanders ===
28–30 April
Scorecard

Kent	v	New Zealanders
324/1d (90 overs); Rob Key 178* (276); Tim Southee 1/49 (15 overs)		92/1 (38.2 overs); Jamie How 53* (106); Ryan McLaren 1/29 (10.2 overs)

Match drawn
St. Lawrence Ground, Canterbury
Umpires: Nigel Cowley (Eng) and Andy Hicks (Eng)

- Kent won the toss and elected to bat.

=== First-class: Essex v New Zealanders ===
2–5 May
Scorecard

New Zealanders	v	Essex
355 (91.1 overs); James Marshall 128 (183); Ryan ten Doeschate 6/57 (17.1 overs)		258 (90.4 overs); Ravi Bopara 66 (109); Michael Mason 4/65 (21 overs)
195 (67.4 overs); Kyle Mills 53 (106); Maurice Chambers 3/37 (12.4 overs)		200 (70.1 overs); Alastair Cook 57 (126); Michael Mason 3/36 (16 overs)

New Zealanders won by 92 runs
Chelmsford, England
Umpires: Terry Urben (Eng) and Peter Willey (Eng)

- Essex won the toss and elected to field.

=== First-class: England Lions v New Zealanders ===
8–11 May
Scorecard

England Lions	v	New Zealanders
280 (87.5 overs); Luke Wright 120 (131); Jacob Oram 3/34 (15 overs)		273 (99.4 overs); Aaron Redmond 146 (300); Matthew Hoggard 3/45 (24 overs)
360/8d (89.3 overs); Michael Carberry 108 (200); Chris Martin 3/76 (19 overs)		201/4 (60 overs); Jamie How 74 (133); Adil Rashid 3/63 (16 overs)

Match drawn
Rose Bowl, Southampton
Umpires: Michael Gough (Eng) and John Steele (Eng)

- England Lions won the toss and elected to bat.

=== First-class: New Zealanders v Northamptonshire ===
30 May – 1 June
Scorecard

New Zealanders	v	Northamptonshire
363 (98.2 overs); Aaron Redmond 121 (227); David Wigley 5/78 (18.2 overs)		214/9d (60.4 overs); Johann Louw 82 (90); Tim Southee 5/42 (16.4 overs)
317/7d (73.2 overs); Ross Taylor 150 (154); David Wigley 4/77 (18 overs)		85/2 (20 overs); Stephen Peters 52 (58); Tim Southee 1/31 (8 overs)

Match drawn
Northampton, England
Umpires: Stephen Gale (Eng) and Nigel Llong (Eng)

- Northamptonshire won the toss and elected to field.

=== List A: New Zealanders v Worcestershire ===
11 June
Scorecard

New Zealanders; 358/8 (50 overs)	v	Worcestershire; 263 (48 overs)
Brendon McCullum 123 (98); Chris Whelan 4/78 (10 overs)		Vikram Solanki 80 (98); Scott Styris 3/25 (8 overs)

New Zealanders won by 95 runs
New Road, Worcester
Umpires: Barry Dudleston (Eng) and Neil Mallender (Eng)

- New Zealanders won the toss and elected to bat.
