= Matt Mason (cricketer) =

Australian former first-class cricketer (born 1974)

Matthew Mason
Personal information
- Full name: Matthew Sean Mason
- Born: 20 March 1974 (age 52); Claremont, Western Australia
- Batting: Right-handed
- Bowling: Right-arm medium-fast
- Role: Bowler

Domestic team information
- Years: Team
- 1996/97–1997/98: Western Australia
- 2002–2011: Worcestershire (squad no. 24)
- FC debut: 14 February 1997 Western Australia v Queensland
- LA debut: 8 February 1997 Western Australia v Tasmania

Career statistics
Competition	FC	LA	T20
Matches	101	82	11
Runs scored	1,387	171	18
Batting average	13.59	7.12	6
100s/50s	0/5	0/0	0/0
Top score	63	25	8*
Balls bowled	18,618	3,714	227
Wickets	318	94	9
Bowling average	27.35	28.48	32.33
5 wickets in innings	10	0	0
10 wickets in match	1	0	0
Best bowling	8/45	4/34	3/42
Catches/stumpings	27/–	16/–	3/–
- Source: CricketArchive, 28 May 2020

Matthew Sean Mason (born 20 March 1974) is an Australian former first-class cricketer. He holds an Irish passport and was therefore not considered an overseas player when playing for Worcestershire County Cricket Club. He played as a right-arm fast-medium bowler, who benefits from his 6-foot 6-inch (1.98 m) height, and a lower-order right-handed batsman.

Mason started his career with Western Australia in 1996–97, and made his senior debut in a February List A win over Tasmania, taking the wicket of Michael di Venuto. Six days later he made his first appearance in first-class cricket in a drawn Sheffield Shield match against Queensland, but could manage only 1-72. He batted as a nightwatchman in his team's second innings, but made just 3 before being bowled by Michael Kasprowicz.

He played another three first-class games and one List A match in 1997–98, but never took more than two wickets in an innings and drifted out of the side. A few years later, Worcestershire coach Tom Moody, who had known Mason since the bowler was a teenager, tried to entice him to New Road to play county cricket, but was turned down; however, a second approach was accepted and Mason became a Worcestershire player in time for the 2002 season.

Mason's first-team experience at Worcester began in the Benson & Hedges Cup, where he took seven wickets in three matches. A number of further one-day games followed, before he was given his County Championship debut against Northamptonshire in July. He responded with six wickets in the match, and kept his place in the first-class side for the rest of the season, taking 5–50 against Nottinghamshire. In the last game of the season in September, he also scored a vital 50 as Worcestershire squeezed past Derbyshire by just one wicket.

2003 saw Mason firmly established in the first team, and he took 53 first-class wickets that year at a fine average of 21.58, as well as 26 wickets at 24.92 in limited-overs cricket. A highlight came in early July, when he took 6–68 in the second innings (and 9–116 in the match) against Durham as Worcestershire recorded a 31-run win. In 2004 he took 52 wickets, albeit at an average slightly over 30, and he passed the 50-wicket mark for the third successive summer in 2005.

He struggled with injuries through 2007 and 2008 before returning to the side and in August 2008, signed a deal with the club which saw him assume the dual role of player and bowling coach in 2009.

== Career Best Performances ==
	Batting				Bowling (innings)			
	Score	Fixture	Venue	Season	Figures	Fixture	Venue	Season
FC	63	Worcestershire v Warwickshire	Worcester	2004	8/45	Worcestershire v Gloucestershire	Worcester	2006
LA	25	Worcestershire v Durham	Worcester	2004	4/34	Worcestershire v Surrey	Guildford	2003
T20	8*	Worcestershire v Warwickshire	Edgbaston	2005	3/42	Worcestershire v Somerset	Worcester	2006
