= Stuart Wedge =

English cricketer (born 1985)

Stuart Andrew Wedge (born 24 October 1985 in Wolverhampton) is an English first-class cricketer. A left arm medium-fast bowler who bats (also left-handed) at or near the bottom of the order, he first played for the Worcestershire second team in the Second XI Championship against Warwickshire at the age of 17 in 2003, but in a match badly affected by the weather he bowled only three overs.

Wedge appeared in six further second XI games in 2004, but had to wait until the following year to make his first-class debut for Worcestershire, against Loughborough UCCE. In an embarrassing eight-wicket loss to the students, Wedge's impact on the game was minimal: he took 0-68 from 17.2 overs, made 0 not out in both innings, and did not hold a catch. Thereafter, he returned to the second team. However, on County Championship debut against Essex in the final match of the 2005 season, Wedge took five for 112 in the first innings of a high-scoring match. He was awarded a one-year contract with the county at the end of September.

Wedge was released by Worcestershire at the end of the 2007 season having failed to play for the first team during the campaign. He is now playing Minor Counties cricket for Herefordshire and plays his club cricket for Birmingham League side Himley.
