= Knappett =

Knappett is a surname. Notable people with the surname include:

- Jessica Knappett (born 1984), British comedy writer and actress
- Josh Knappett (born 1985), English cricketer
