= Steven Davies =

English cricketer (born 1986)

Steven Davies MBE
Personal information
- Full name: Steven Michael Davies
- Born: 17 June 1986 (age 40); Bromsgrove, Worcestershire, England
- Height: 5 ft 11 in (1.80 m)
- Batting: Left-handed
- Role: Batsman, Wicket-keeper

International information
- National side: England (2009–2011)
- ODI debut (cap 213): 2 October 2009 v Australia
- Last ODI: 6 February 2011 v Australia
- ODI shirt no.: 43
- T20I debut (cap 41): 15 March 2009 v West Indies
- Last T20I: 14 January 2011 v Australia
- T20I shirt no.: 43

Domestic team information
- Years: Team
- 2003–2009: Worcestershire (squad no. 16)
- 2010–2016: Surrey (squad no. 9)
- 2017–2023: Somerset (squad no. 11)

Career statistics
Competition	ODI	T20I	FC	LA
Matches	8	5	254	197
Runs scored	244	102	14,298	5,959
Batting average	30.50	20.40	37.23	34.84
100s/50s	0/1	0/0	25/68	9/37
Top score	87	33	200*	127*
Catches/stumpings	8/0	2/1	621/34	160/42
- Source: ESPNcricinfo, 20 May 2023

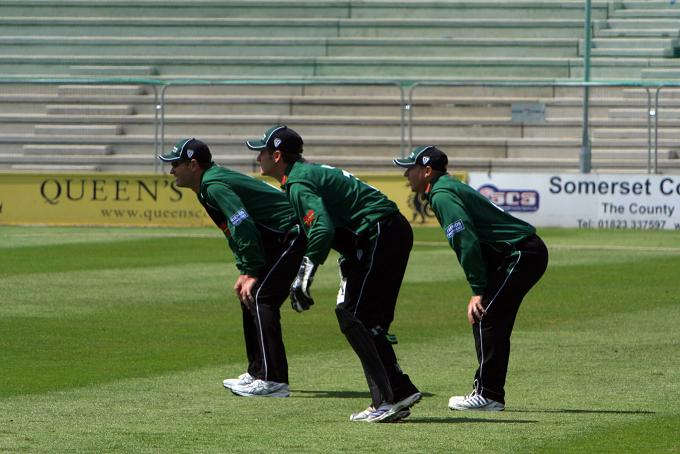
Steven Davies (centre) keeping wicket for Worcestershire at Taunton against Somerset, alongside Graeme Hick (left) and Ben Smith (right) in the slips

Steven Michael Davies MBE (born 17 June 1986) is a retired English first-class cricketer, a left-handed batsman who last played for Somerset. He batted in the middle order in first-class cricket and opened in limited-overs. He played primarily as a wicket-keeper, featuring in ODI and Twenty20 cricket in this role for England. He was made an MBE in the King's Birthday Honours of 2025.

== Domestic career ==
=== Youth and early career ===
Educated at King Charles I School in Kidderminster, Davies began his career playing for Worcestershire in 2001, playing a number of games in second eleven cricket and in the ECB 38-County Cup, and played one C&G Trophy match in each of the following two seasons. In February and March 2004 he appeared for England Under-19s in the Under-19 World Cup in Bangladesh, averaging 55.25 from six innings.

=== Worcestershire ===
In 2004 he made his senior Worcestershire debut, in a one-day game against Sri Lanka A. He also played for the England Under-19s in the home series against Bangladesh, and captained the side on tour in India throughout the series of three "Tests" and five "One-Day Internationals". In 2004, too, Davies was awarded the NBC Denis Compton Award.

Davies made his first-class debut against Loughborough UCCE in April 2005, making 6 and 37 as his county succumbed to an unimpressive eight-wicket defeat. An unsuccessful totesport League match against Nottinghamshire followed a few days later, but nevertheless he opened the batting for Worcestershire in County Championship games against Somerset and Durham.

A run of poor scores (4, 1, 1 and 0) put the pressure on Davies, and despite an effort of 49 in the second innings against Leicestershire he was again relegated to the second XI in mid-June, and he failed to make a significant impact in the Under-19 series against Sri Lanka. Recalled to the Worcestershire first team, however, he grasped the opportunity with both hands, making 59, 5, 95, 37 and 148 in successive Championship innings. Originally playing as a specialist opening batsman, he moved down the order and took over duties behind the stumps from Jamie Pipe midway through 2005.

After his first call up to the England A squad, Davies scored 192, to date his highest first-class score, against Gloucestershire in June 2006, sharing a partnership worth 345 runs with Vikram Solanki (who scored 222), and also taking five first-innings catches.

Towards the end of the 2008 domestic season, Davies hit an outstanding run of form in the 40-over Natwest League, in which he both kept wicket and opened the batting; his scores in August were 16 off 18 balls, 103 not out off 100, 59 off 53, 92 off 93, and 119 off 87 (the 103* and 119 being his first two limited overs centuries). This excellent run of form resulted in his inclusion in the England ODI squad for the 2009 tour of West Indies.

=== Surrey ===
On 25 August 2009, it was announced that Davies would move from Worcestershire at the end of the season. He signed a three-year contract with Surrey. Three months later, wicket-keeper Jon Batty who had been a part of the club since 1997 left, leaving Davies as the main 'keeper with Gary Wilson as back up. Early in the 2014 season, Davies gave up wicket-keeping to concentrate on batting. It was originally a temporary measure but he did not keep wicket for 2 years. In April 2016, Davies stated his desire to resume wicketkeeping in an effort to increase his chances of a recall to the England team, but by this time he had been usurped by Ben Foakes at Surrey, and Davies only kept in three matches in 2016. His time as a batsman proved successful, scoring over 1000 runs in both 2014 and 2016.

=== Somerset ===
On 14 September 2016, Surrey announced that Davies had turned down a new contract so would leave the club at the end of the season. Davies then signed a three-year deal with Somerset, with the aim of returning to both wicket-keeping and international cricket. That contract has since been extended.

He retired at the end of the 2023 season.

== International career ==
On 19 September 2005 Davies was named in the 17-man ECB National Academy squad. In March 2006, he was called up to the England A squad to replace Chris Read, who had returned home after a burglary at his house. He was named in the England A squad touring Bangladesh in 2007.

He made his Twenty20 International debut for England, opening the batting along with Ravi Bopara against the West Indies in Port of Spain on 15 March 2009, top-scoring with 27 from 21 balls as England reached 55 for 1, before collapsing to 121 all out.

In October 2009, Davies was called up to England's Test squad for the first time. Geoff Miller, England's chairman of selectors, said "Steven is a player of great potential who has been a consistent performer for his county and he will act as understudy to Matt Prior in South Africa". Although part of the Test squad, Davies was not selected for the ODI squad on the tour.

Davies made his ODI debut in the 2009 ICC Champions Trophy semi-final against Australia on 2 October, after regular wicket-keeper Matt Prior fell ill, but only scored 5 runs in a 9-wicket defeat. Davies had to wait nearly a year for his next appearance. After both Prior and Craig Kieswetter were dropped, Davies was given the gloves for the Pakistan ODI series during September 2010. England won the ODI series 3–2, with Davies earning himself a man-of-the-match award in the first game after top-scoring with 87.

After the series, Davies was selected along with Prior as a keeper in England's squad for the 2010–11 Ashes series in Australia, although he was not required to play as England retained the Ashes with a 3–1 victory. In the one-day games that followed, he played in two Twenty20s before scoring 42 in the first ODI. However, when the squad for the 2011 World Cup was announced before the second ODI, Davies was left out in favour of Prior, who then joined up with the ODI side despite not originally being selected in the squad.

Davies had to wait until England toured the UAE in January 2012 for a recall. He was included as cover for Prior in the 16-man squad to face Pakistan in three Tests.

== Personal life ==
Davies is openly gay; he came out publicly on 27 February 2011 in an interview with The Daily Telegraph. He had come out to his family five years earlier and was also already out to his teammates. He became the first male international cricketer to come out as gay.
