= Shaftab Khalid =

Pakistani-born English cricketer

Personal information
- Full name: Shaftab Ahmed Khalid
- Born: 6 October 1982 (age 44); Worcester, England
- Batting: Right-handed
- Bowling: Right-arm Off break

Domestic team information
- Years: Team
- 2009: Hertfordshire
- 2003–2005: Worcestershire

Career statistics
Competition	FC	LA	T20
Matches	10	10	1
Runs scored	64	13	–
Batting average	9.14	6.50	–
100s/50s	0/0	0/0	–
Top score	20	9*	–
Balls bowled	1,280	327	6
Wickets	14	4	0
Bowling average	50.85	71.00	–
5 wickets in innings	0	0	–
10 wickets in match	0	0	–
Best bowling	4/131	2/40	–
Catches/stumpings	3/–	1/–	0/–
- Source: ESPNcricinfo, 20 July 2010

Shaftab Ahmed Khalid (born 6 October 1982) is an English first-class cricketer, a right-arm off-spinner who also bats right-handed. He was born to Pakistani parents in Worcester on 6 October 1982.

Khalid made his first-class debut for Worcestershire against Oxford University in April 2003, taking 2–59 in the only innings he bowled, in a drawn match affected by the weather. A rather anonymous Twenty20 Cup game (1-0-13-0; DNB) against Somerset followed, but he did take the wicket of South African captain Graeme Smith in the one-day game against the tourists in late June; his first County Championship victim was Glamorgan captain Robert Croft four days later.

After that, Khalid played several more times that summer for the Worcestershire first team, his best returns coming against Northants in mid September when he took 3-70 and 4–131. In 2003, too, he was the recipient of an NBC Denis Compton Award. Khalid was selected for the 2003-04 ECB National Academy intake, and travelled to India, where he was called up to play in three List A games for England A, including one "unofficial ODI" against India A at Chennai; he was not a success, however, taking 1-60 from an expensive ten-over spell.

In 2004 Khalid started the season with appearances in the County Championship and totesport League, but failed to make a serious impression and by mid-June had been relegated to the second team. Although he did return to the first XI in September, it was a frustrating season for the player, who took only four first-class wickets at 69.25 and claimed just one victim in one-day cricket.

Like a number of the county's other fringe players, Khalid played in the 2005 pre-season match against Loughborough UCCE, but the county's eight-wicket defeat and his own failure to take a single wicket put paid to his chances of making a name for himself, and again he returned to the seconds. He was a surprise call up to the Northamptonshire squad as cover for Nicky Boje for their County Championship match against Surrey in 2010, but did not feature in the starting eleven.
