= Daryl Mitchell (English cricketer) =

English cricketer

Personal information
- Full name: Daryl Keith Henry Mitchell
- Born: 25 November 1983 (age 42); Badsey, Worcestershire, England
- Height: 5 ft 10 in (1.78 m)
- Batting: Right-handed
- Bowling: Right-arm medium
- Role: Batsman

Domestic team information
- Years: Team
- 2005–2021: Worcestershire (squad no. 27)
- 2012: Mountaineers
- FC debut: 8 May 2005 Worcestershire v Loughborough UCCE
- Last FC: 21 September 2021 Worcestershire v Leicestershire
- LA debut: 12 June 2005 Worcestershire v Bangladeshis
- Last LA: 10 May 2019 Worcestershire v Somerset

Career statistics
Competition	FC	LA	T20
Matches	225	135	177
Runs scored	13,920	3,466	2,310
Batting average	38.34	33.65	22.87
100s/50s	39/55	4/22	0/7
Top score	298	107	68*
Balls bowled	3,289	3,181	2,341
Wickets	33	81	101
Bowling average	49.96	36.11	29.69
5 wickets in innings	0	0	1
10 wickets in match	0	0	0
Best bowling	4/49	4/19	5/28
Catches/stumpings	301/–	56/–	74/–
- Source: CricketArchive, 24 September 2021

Daryl Keith Henry Mitchell (born 25 November 1983) is an English former first-class cricketer. Primarily a right-handed batsman who often opened the innings, Mitchell also bowled right-arm medium pace. He played for Worcestershire. He was appointed vice-captain for the 2010 season, and made captain when Vikram Solanki resigned in mid-August.

== Career ==
=== Debut ===
After having appeared fairly regularly in the Worcestershire second team since 2002, Mitchell made his first-class debut for the county in May 2005 against Loughborough UCCE at Kidderminster. He made only five and 12 as Worcestershire slumped to an eight-wicket defeat, but after a few weeks out of the side Mitchell returned to the first team, and in mid-June he scored 63 against Leicestershire.

Mitchell's first full season was in the Twenty20 Cup saw a failure with the bat – an aggregate of just nine runs in four innings – balanced by five wickets in 13 overs with the ball, including 2–26 against Somerset.

=== 2006–2008 ===
After a successful winter playing in Australia, Mitchell began the 2006 season as a first choice opener in the absence of overseas player Phil Jaques and scored his first half-century of the season against Somerset.

=== 2009 ===
Mitchell endured a tricky 2009 season, struggling to make the impression at the top of the order he did the season before with Stephen Moore. However, Mitchell produced a strong batting performance in the penultimate Championship game of the season against Somerset at Taunton. He struck 298, his maiden first-class double century and the fifth highest individual score by a Worcestershire batsman, which included 54 boundaries and one six. He also became the first cricketer in history to be dismissed for that score.

During an end-of-season 20-over benefit match, Mitchell further demonstrated his versatility by keeping wicket, taking two stumpings.

=== 2010-2021 ===
Mitchell was appointed vice-captain to Vikram Solanki for the start of the season, replacing the departed Gareth Batty. He struck a rich vein of form that season, scoring four centuries and 1,000 runs by mid-August. Three of his centuries came in consecutive innings, two against Gloucestershire at Cheltenham, where he led Worcestershire to an improbable victory having been 202 behind on first innings, and another, a fine 165, against Glamorgan. Following defeat in this last match, Solanki resigned as captain, and Mitchell was immediately appointed his successor.

He announced his intention to retire at the end of the 2021 season.

=== Career best performances ===
Updated 28 September 2017

	Batting				Bowling			
	Score	Fixture	Venue	Season	Score	Fixture	Venue	Season
FC	298	Worcestershire v Somerset	Taunton	2009	4–49	Worcestershire v Yorkshire	Headingley	2009
LA	107	Worcestershire v Sussex	Hove	2013	4–19	Worcestershire v Northamptonshire	Milton Keynes	2014
T20	68*	Worcestershire v Derbyshire	Derby	2014	5-28	Worcestershire v Northamptonshire	Northampton	2014

=== Professional Cricketers' Association ===
Mitchell was elected as the representative for Worcestershire on the Professional Cricketers' Association committee in 2009. He became the PCA chairman in February 2017, and was elected for a final two-year term in February 2019, having to guide the Association through the problems caused by the COVID-19 pandemic.

=== After Cricket ===
Following his retirement at the end of the 2021 cricket season, Mitchell switched sports to football and signed for Hellenic Football League side Moreton Rangers.

== Notes ==
Sporting positions
Preceded by Vikram Solanki	Worcestershire County Cricket Captain; 2010–2016	Succeeded by Joe Leach
Preceded by Mark Wallace	Chairman of the Professional Cricketers' Association; 2017–2021	Succeeded by James Harris
