= Josh Knappett =

English cricketer

Personal information
- Full name: Joshua Philip Thomas Knappett
- Born: 15 April 1985 (age 41); Westminster, London, England
- Height: 6 ft 0 in (1.83 m)
- Batting: Right-handed
- Role: Wicket-keeper

Domestic team information
- Years: Team
- 2003–2009: Worcestershire (squad no. 23)
- 2010–2012: Unicorns (squad no. 12)

Career statistics
Competition	FC	LA
Matches	13	23
Runs scored	523	571
Batting average	30.76	27.19
100s/50s	1/3	0/4
Top score	100	91
Catches/stumpings	26/3	16/4
- Source: , 15 September 2022

Joshua Philip Thomas "Josh" Knappett (born 15 April 1985) is an English cricket coach and former English first-class cricketer.

As a player he was a right-handed batsman and wicket-keeper who has played for Worcestershire County Cricket Club, Unicorns, British Universities and Oxford University Centre of Cricketing Excellence.

== Cricket career ==
=== Youth and early career ===
Born 15 April 1985 in Westminster, London, Knappett grew up playing at Finchley Cricket Club in the Middlesex Premier League, playing representative cricket through the Middlesex age groups. He later went on to play 2nd Xl cricket for Middlesex at 16 before going to university at Oxford Brookes.

He made his Oxford UCCE debut in 2004, and scored his maiden first-class century (exactly 100 not out) for them against Durham on 31 May 2006. He captained the side in his final year at university and represented the British Universities against Bangladesh and later Sri Lanka.

=== Professional career ===
He made his county cricket debut in Worcestershire's last Championship game of 2007, when he played (as a batsman) in the innings defeat by Sussex that made the latter Division 1 County Champions. His only other first team experience was against Durham County Cricket Club at Riverside Ground in 2009. He played when Steve Davies was away representing the Lions.

Knappett was released by Worcestershire at the end of the 2009 season after a 5-year career.

In 2010, Knappett was selected in the first Unicorns squad to take part in the Clydesdale Bank 40 domestic limited overs competition against the regular first-class counties. The Unicorns were made up of 15 former county cricket professionals and 6 young cricketers looking to make it in the professional game. He represented the Unicorns in every game for the first 2 years of creation, making notable performances in the world record holding highest successful run chase in a 40 over List A fixture. He made 90 off 87 balls supporting Wes Durston. He later surpassed this score when he made 91 returning to New Road, Worcester. This stayed his career best score in List A format.

=== MCC ===
In 2005 Knappett toured with Marylebone Cricket Club (MCC) during their non-first-class tour of Canada. He then went on to represent the club in Botswana and Zambia, Fiji and Samoa, then more recently Bermuda under the watchful eye of Mike Griffith, the MCC chairman, and Geoffrey Boycott, the club ambassador.

=== Coaching career ===
Josh, is a known coach, having achieved his ECB Level III coaching qualification at 18 years old, followed by his UKCC ECB Level IV Elite Coach qualification in 2013. He is an ECB tutor, assessor and field-based trainer / internal verifier for delivering coach education courses.

He has worked at differing levels of Middlesex Cricket from their Professional Men's squad as a fielding coach specialist, and with wicket keepers; Simpson, Rossington, Eskinazi, White and Cracknell, to Wicket Keeping and Fielding Lead for Middlesex Academy, West Regional Academy Coach and Age Group Coach from 2012. From 2018, Josh started providing his services to Middlesex Cricket in their partnership with Sachin Tendulkar; Tendulkar Middlesex Global Academy.

Josh led Teddington Cricket Club as Head of Youth Cricket and First Team Coach, from 2012 to 2018. Where he grew the junior section substantially and supported the first team in securing 1st Xl ECB Middlesex Premier League in 2014 and 2016.

Prior to that, he was Oxford University Women's Coach for 2008 and was Wicket Keeping Coach To Oxford MCCU in 2014.

He started his coaching from a young age due to an upbringing supporting the delivery of Middlesex Cricket's coach education programme. This formalised from the early 2000s and provided him the foundations of his approach and skill set today.
