= James Pipe =

English cricketer (born 1977)

Personal information
- Full name: David James Pipe
- Born: 16 December 1977 (age 48); Bradford, West Yorkshire, England
- Nickname: Pipey
- Height: 5 ft 11 in (1.80 m)
- Batting: Right-handed
- Role: Wicket-keeper

Domestic team information
- Years: Team
- 1998–2005: Worcestershire
- 2006–2009: Derbyshire

Career statistics
Competition	FC	LA	T20
Matches	82	72	45
Runs scored	2,870	837	353
Batting average	28.98	17.43	13.57
100s/50s	4/12	0/3	0/0
Top score	133*	83	45
Catches/stumpings	225/21	64/17	19/13
- Source: CricketArchive, 29 September 2016

David James Pipe (born 16 December 1977) is a former English first-class cricketer, who played as a wicket-keeper.

Pipe was born at Bradford and made his first-class debut for Worcestershire against Oxford University in May 1998, recording two catches and a stumping. However, the presence of Steve Rhodes in the side meant that his first-team opportunities were limited apart from a small number of games in 2000 and 2001 when both played, Pipe appearing as a specialist batsman. He did, however, make eight dismissals in a single one-day innings against Hertfordshire in 2001; this set up a county record.

Pipe had a longer run in the first XI when Rhodes was injured in the latter part of the 2003 season, and against Hampshire in early September made his first century, scoring an unbeaten 104. When Rhodes retired from playing at the end of the following season, Pipe became Worcestershire's first choice, taking 42 catches, but lost his place to Steven Davies later in the summer.

He left for Derbyshire for the 2006 season, and did a good job in his first season at Derbyshire, averaging over 30 with the bat and taking 39 catches and 6 stumpings; he also scored three half-centuries, before suffering a serious injury which ended his season.

He completed a degree in Physiotherapy at the University of Salford in 2008. In 2009 it was announced that he would be retiring at the end of the season to become Derbyshire's new physiotherapist.
