= Scott Styris =

New Zealand cricketer

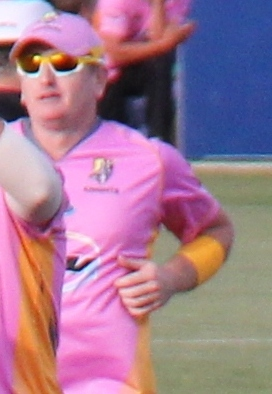

Personal information
- Full name: Scott Bernardo Styris
- Nickname: Miley, The Rus, The Virus, Pig
- Height: 5 ft 8 in (1.73 m)
- Batting: Right-handed
- Bowling: Right-arm medium
- Role: Batting all-rounder

International information
- National side: New Zealand (1999–2011)
- Test debut (cap 221): 28 June 2002 v West Indies
- Last Test: 16 November 2007 v South Africa
- ODI debut (cap 111): 5 November 1999 v India
- Last ODI: 29 March 2011 v Sri Lanka
- ODI shirt no.: 56
- T20I debut (cap 9): 17 February 2005 v Australia
- Last T20I: 30 December 2010 v Pakistan

Domestic team information
- Years: Team
- 1994/95–2004/05: Northern Districts
- 2005–2006: Middlesex
- 2005/06–2009/10: Auckland
- 2007: Durham
- 2008–2009: Deccan Chargers
- 2010–2011: Essex
- 2010/11–2014/15: Northern Districts
- 2011: Chennai Super Kings
- 2012: Sylhet Royals
- 2012–2013: Sussex
- 2012: Kandurata Warriors
- 2012/13: Hobart Hurricanes
- 2013: Titans
- 2013: Gazi Tank Cricketers
- 2014: Leicestershire

Career statistics
Competition	Test	ODI	FC	LA
Matches	29	188	128	354
Runs scored	1,586	4,483	6,048	8,709
Batting average	36.04	32.48	31.33	33.49
100s/50s	5/6	4/28	10/30	7/57
Top score	170	141	212*	141
Balls bowled	1,960	6,114	12,826	12,259
Wickets	20	137	204	303
Bowling average	50.75	35.32	31.59	31.00
5 wickets in innings	0	1	9	1
10 wickets in match	0	0	1	0
Best bowling	3/28	6/25	6/32	6/25
Catches/stumpings	23/–	73/–	102/–	135/–
Medal record
Men's cricket
Representing New Zealand
ICC Champions Trophy
Winner	2000 Kenya
- Source: ESPNcricinfo, 2 January 2017

Scott Bernardo Styris is a New Zealand cricket commentator and former cricketer, who played all formats of the game. An allrounder, Styris played as an aggressive right-handed middle order batsman and a right-arm medium pace bowler. Styris was a member of the New Zealand team that won the 2000 ICC KnockOut Trophy.

== Domestic career ==
In 2005 he signed with Middlesex and stayed with them for the 2006 season as well where he deputised for the country captain Ben Hutton in several matches. He received his county cap during the 2006 season. He signed a 2-month contract at Durham County Cricket Club from 1 June 2007. He was bought to play for the IPL 2009 champions Deccan Chargers, which is a Hyderabad based Indian Premier League franchise. In 2010 Styris played for Essex County Cricket Club in the Friends Provident t20 competition and returned to the club for the 2011 season. In 2012 while playing for Sussex County Cricket Club, Styris scored the equal third-fastest T20 century (37 balls) in the quarter finals of the 2012 Friends Life t20 competition. It won the 2012 Walter Lawrence Trophy.

== International career ==
Styris made his debut for New Zealand in a One Day International at Rajkot in 1999/2000. His maiden wicket was that of Sachin Tendulkar, one of 3 wickets for the match.

He had to wait until mid-2002 to play his first Test Match, against the West Indies at Grenada. His debut had almost come at Karachi 2 months earlier but the match was abandoned due to bomb blasts near the team hotel. In the Test at Grenada he batted at number 8 and top scored with 107. When it was New Zealand's time to bowl Styris came on and took 2 for 88. The first of his wickets was that of Brian Lara which gave him impressive maiden scalps in both formats of the game. He made an unbeaten 69 in the second innings to complete a dream debut but missed out on the man of the match award which went to Chris Gayle who scored a double hundred.

In the ODI series after the Tests he continued his form but this time with the ball, taking 6 for 25 at Trinidad. This broke the record for best One Day International bowling figures by a New Zealander. At Mohali in 2003/04 against India he scored his second Test hundred with 119, one of 4 New Zealander's to make a century in the innings. Soon after he made his career best Test score of 170 against South Africa in Auckland, his innings taking just 220 balls.

In June 2004 New Zealand toured England and Styris impressed at Nottingham, making 108. He scored his fifth Test hundred at Auckland against the West Indies, an unbeaten 103 helping his side to win the Test. When New Zealand chased what was then an ODI record of 322 in 2005/06 against Australia at Christchurch, Styris contributed 101.

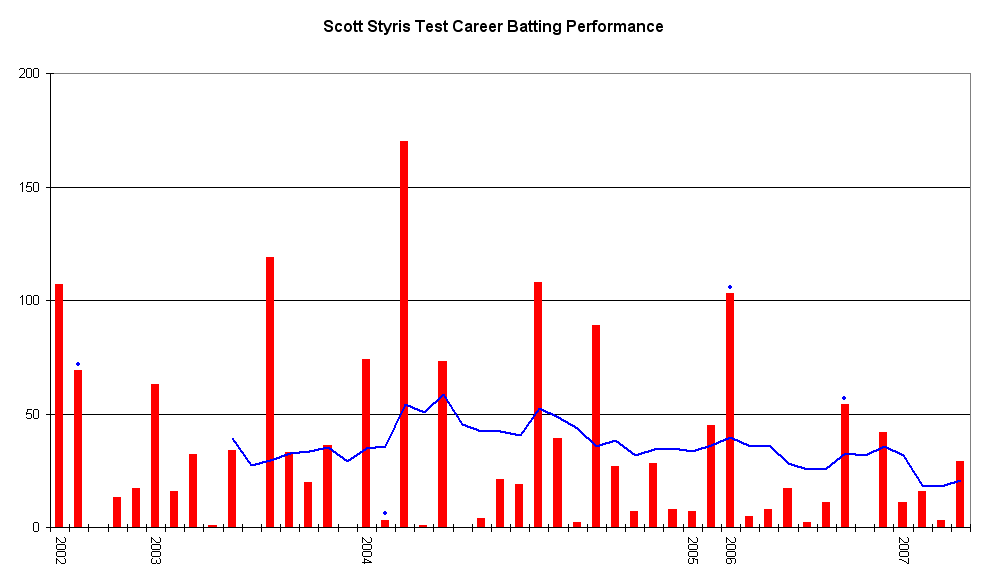
An innings-by-innings breakdown of Styris' Test match batting career, showing runs scored (red bars) and the average of the last ten innings (blue line).

He then suffered a back injury missed out on the Sri Lanka series of December 2006. Making his return in the latter stages of the Commonwealth Bank series in Australia and then in the Chappell Hadlee series at home, Styris had done enough to be included New Zealand's World Cup squad.

Styris started the tournament with the man of the match award in a win over England at St Lucia. Chasing 210 for victory, Styris made an unbeaten 87 to guide his side home. His pugnacious batting style and distinctive gait led to former England captain Nasser Hussain referring to him as a "street fighter" from the commentary booth during the game. He made another half century in the game against Kenya and made 80 not out in a successful run chase against the home side. In the Super Eight stage the New Zealanders played Sri Lanka and Styris top-scored with 111 not out. The century came off 152 balls. It was his second ever World Cup century; he scored one in 2003.

Shortly after the world cup Styris' form dropped of contributing to injuries and not enough practice due to the injuries. He then participated in a test series against South Africa in 2007 but was dropped from the test squad.

He then continued to participate in ODI's and took part when the English cricket team were touring New Zealand in January to February 2008 and the Subsequent Return tour he participated well in both series with the bat but not much with the ball.

Styris, aged 35 and competing for a competitive medium pace all-rounder slot with Grant Elliott, was selected for the Tri-series in Sri Lanka August 2010 he scored 88 runs in the first ODI. He completed his comeback by showing a bowling performance in the next match against Sri Lanka when he took the wicket of Kumar Sangakkara However, after the tournament he suffered a back stress fracture during training and missed the series against Bangladesh and India.

== Personal life ==
In 2010, Styris married former Miss New Zealand runner-up and former trampolinist Nicky Styris (née Walker). She went on to become TV3/Newshub sports presenter.
