= 2002 English cricket season =

The 2002 English cricket season was the 103rd in which the County Championship had been an official competition. Surrey were crowned champions but 2001 county champions Yorkshire were relegated. Yorkshire did, however, win the C&G Trophy. Warwickshire beat Essex at Lord's to win the final edition of the Benson and Hedges Cup which would be replaced with the incoming Twenty20 Cup from the 2003 English domestic season onwards. In international cricket India and Sri Lanka toured England to compete in a Test series with England. England drew with India 1-1 and beat Sri Lanka 2–0.

== Honours ==
- County Championship – Surrey
- C&G Trophy – Yorkshire
- National League – Glamorgan
- Benson & Hedges Cup – Warwickshire
- Minor Counties Championship – Herefordshire, Norfolk (shared title)
- MCCA Knockout Trophy – Warwickshire Cricket Board
- Second XI Championship – Kent II
- Second XI Trophy – Kent II
- Wisden – Matthew Hayden, Adam Hollioake, Nasser Hussain, Shaun Pollock, Michael Vaughan

== Events ==
Playing against West Indies A at the County Ground, Taunton, Somerset set a record for the highest fourth-innings total to tie a first-class match, by scoring 453.

== Annual reviews ==
- Playfair Cricket Annual 2003
- Wisden Cricketers' Almanack 2003
