= Nadeem Malik (cricketer) =

English cricketer

Personal information
- Full name: Muhammad Nadeem Malik
- Born: 6 October 1982 (age 44); Nottingham, Nottinghamshire, England
- Height: 6 ft 5 in (1.96 m)
- Batting: Right-handed
- Bowling: Right-arm medium-fast

Domestic team information
- Years: Team
- 2000–2004: Nottinghamshire
- 2004–2007: Worcestershire
- 2008–2012: Leicestershire (squad no. 21)

Career statistics
Competition	FC	LA	T20
Matches	90	83	38
Runs scored	768	134	12
Batting average	9.84	9.57	2.40
100s/50s	0/0	0/0	0/0
Top score	41	27*	3*
Balls bowled	14,140	3,298	751
Wickets	235	85	41
Bowling average	35.66	34.44	24.90
5 wickets in innings	7	0	0
10 wickets in match	0	0	0
Best bowling	6/46	4/40	4/16
Catches/stumpings	11/–	10/–	3/–
- Source: , 10 October 2011

Nadeem Malik (Urdu: ندیم ملک; born 6 October 1982) is an English first-class cricketer, a right-arm fast-medium seam bowler and right-handed lower-order batsman. He was born to British Pakistani parents in Nottingham on 6 October 1982.

After several appearances for the second team, Malik made his List A debut with the Nottinghamshire Cricket Board team at the age of 17 against Gloucestershire Cricket Board in the 2000 NatWest Trophy, bowling six overs without reward. That winter he toured India with England Under-19s, though played in only two the final two unofficial "ODIs".

Malik made his full Nottinghamshire debut in May 2001, against Durham in the Benson & Hedges Cup, though he conceded 20 runs from the mere three overs he was allowed. His first-class debut had to wait until the match against Worcestershire in August, when he claimed a notable first wicket at this level in Graeme Hick.

After an injury-hit trip to New Zealand for the 2002 Under-19 World Cup, he spent another two years at Trent Bridge, but in 2003 he became frustrated by the lack of first-team opportunities after playing just two first-team games all summer and signed for Worcestershire at the end of the season, a move he had first considered a year before. Malik cited his admiration of then Worcestershire coach Tom Moody as a reason for his choice.

Malik's Worcestershire career got off to an excellent start, when after claiming 6–41 in a minor match against Cardiff UCCE he marked his first-class debut for his new county with 5–88 against Kent, his first victim being Test batsman Rob Key. Shortly afterwards, Malik took 4–42 in a totesport League game against Sussex.

Although he could not quite keep up this standard, Malik finished the season with 24 first-class wickets at 32.54 and 19 in List A cricket, and although he missed Worcestershire's early games in 2005, by June he was firmly established in the first team as the county's fourth seamer.

However, in the next two seasons he struggled to maintain a first team place, even returning to Nottinghamshire for a short-term loan spell, before in December 2007, he signed a one-year deal with Leicestershire.

Malik did not bowl a ball in 2009 after suffering a number of injuries but he made his mark in 2010, playing a key role in being the first change bowler once Matthew Hoggard and Nathan Buck had finished their opening bursts. Consequently, he was given a new one-year deal, which was followed by another one-year deal and he will now be at Grace Road until at least the end of the 2012 season.
