= David Wigley =

English cricketer (born 1981)

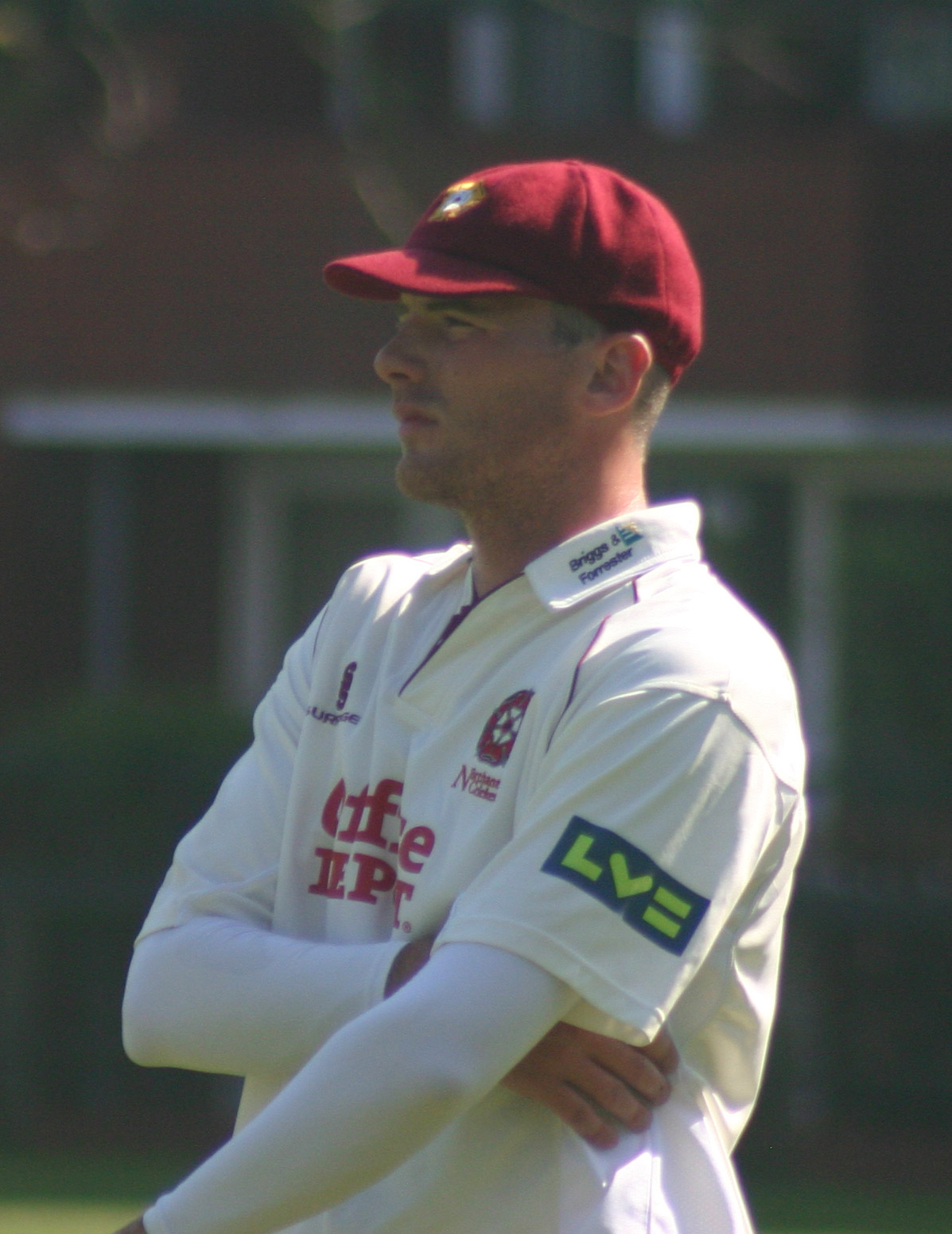
- Wigley in 2007

Personal information
- Full name: David Harry Wigley
- Born: 26 October 1981 (age 45); Bradford, England
- Nickname: Wigs, Wiggers
- Height: 6 ft 3 in (1.91 m)
- Batting: Right-handed
- Bowling: Right-arm fast-medium
- Role: Bowler

Domestic team information
- Years: Team
- 2000–2003: Yorkshire
- 2003–2005: Worcestershire
- 2005–2010: Northamptonshire (squad no. 14)

Career statistics
Competition	FC	LA	T20
Matches	50	24	2
Runs scored	532	34	1
Batting average	13.30	2.83	1
100s/50s	0/2	0/0	0/0
Top score	350	10	1
Balls bowled	7,249	822	30
Wickets	136	16	1
Bowling average	36.26	54.37	33.00
5 wickets in innings	4	0	0
10 wickets in match	0	0	0
Best bowling	6/72	4/37	1/8
Catches/stumpings	22/–	7/–	6/–
- Source: Cricinfo, 28 September 2009

David Harry Wigley (born 26 October 1981, Bradford, Yorkshire, England) is an English former first-class cricketer. He latterly played for Northamptonshire County Cricket Club, his third county after previously playing for Yorkshire and then Worcestershire, until his early retirement from the game in 2010. He was a right arm fast medium bowler and right-handed batsman.

== Yorkshire ==
After a number of matches for Yorkshire's Second XI, he made his first senior appearance for the county in a List A game against West Indies A at Headingley Cricket Ground, Leeds, in July 2002, but conceded 38 runs in seven wicketless overs. Wigley made his first-class debut later that month against Surrey at Guildford, but again struggled, conceding 116 runs from 20.4 overs for the solitary wicket of Saqlain Mushtaq.

== Worcestershire ==
In 2003, after a single game for Loughborough UCCE, he was signed by Worcestershire, making a couple of first-team appearances late in the season. He played for both Loughborough and Worcestershire in 2004, captaining the university side, and then spent the winter playing club cricket in Perth, Western Australia.

In 2005, Wigley played three County Championship games in April, but was unfortunate to suffer injury against Lancashire at the end of the month, when his hand was broken by a beamer sent down by Jimmy Anderson. He was sidelined for more than a month, and though he played one-day matches against the Bangladeshis and Essex he was unable to force his way back into the first team.

== Northamptonshire ==
That winter, Wigley moved to Northamptonshire, and in 2006 he was given more opportunities than he had had at Worcestershire, playing in eight first-class and five one-day games. His season was rather mixed: in first-class cricket he took 18 wickets at 44.22, and claimed his first five-wicket haul in taking 5 for 77 against the Pakistanis in July, but in the one-day games he struggled, recording an aggregate analysis of 29–0–181–0. In the 2008 season he was loaned out by Northamptonshire for a single match to Gloucestershire. Early in the 2009 season he found some form in the longer format of the game, when he recorded his best figures with 6 for 42 against Gloucestershire.

== Life after cricket ==
Wigley took early retirement in 2010, after only competing for just over three weeks that summer. A long-term injury, and then a failed epidural injection, meant he was admitted to hospital three times in as many weeks. A drastic loss of weight and strength, plus continued nausea and headaches, meant that Wigley was unable to play enough cricket to gain a new contract, and without further epidural's was not confident enough in his body to continue playing.

Wigley now coaches at the Old Northamptonians Cricket Club in the Northants Premier League, and privately through his own company. He also works for Willis Towers Watson. He's a Divisional Director for the Real Estate Team in London, England. He also does work for Leadingedgesport.com, as a player representative. Wigley has also set up his own business providing employee wellbeing services to corporate companies.
