= Stephen Peters =

English cricketer

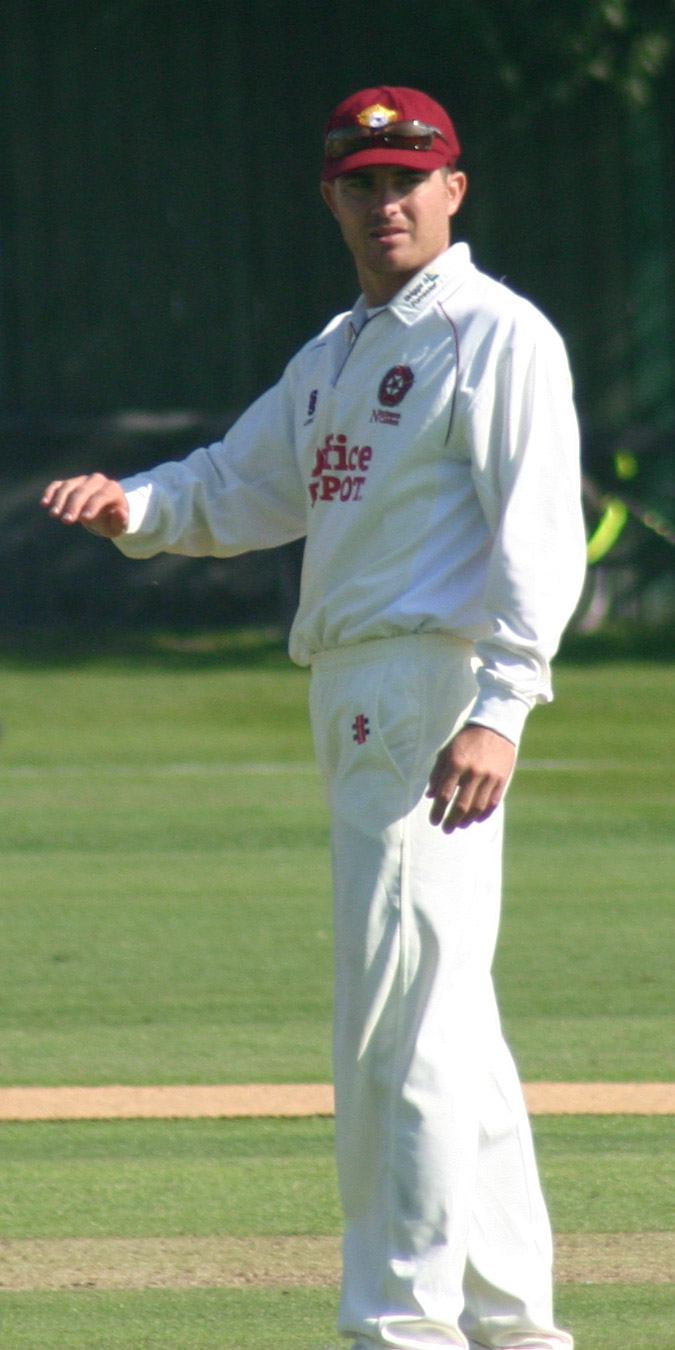

Personal information
- Full name: Stephen David Peters
- Born: 10 December 1978 (age 47); Harold Wood, England
- Nickname: Pedro
- Height: 5 ft 11 in (1.80 m)
- Batting: Right-handed
- Role: Opening Batsman

Domestic team information
- Years: Team
- 1996–2001: Essex
- 2002–2005: Worcestershire
- 2006–2015: Northamptonshire (squad no. 11)

Career statistics
Competition	FC	LA	T20
Matches	260	177	24
Runs scored	14,231	3,444	300
Batting average	34.87	22.65	17.64
100s/50s	31/71	2/21	0/1
Top score	222	107	61*
Balls bowled	35	–	–
Wickets	1	–	–
Bowling average	31.00	–	–
5 wickets in innings	0	–	–
10 wickets in match	0	–	–
Best bowling	1/19	–	–
Catches/stumpings	192/–	48/–	7/–
- Source: CricketArchive, 15 January 2016

Stephen David Peters (born 10 December 1978) is an English former cricketer. In a professional career spanning nearly twenty years, he played for Essex, Worcestershire and Northamptonshire county cricket clubs.

== Career ==
Stephen showed early promise during his time at Essex, scoring 110 on his debut against Cambridge UCCE in 1996 and was picked for the England U19 team that won the World Cup, Peters helped them to this by scoring a century and getting the man of the match award in the final.

Stephen then moved to Worcestershire to regenerate his career. After three seasons at Worcester, he moved to Northants for the start of the 2006 season. While at Northants, he scored his then highest first-class score when he made 178* against his former club Essex in his first season. The 2010 season was his best with the bat as he twice set himself a new highest first-class score both coming against Middlesex, making 183* against at Northampton on 24 April and then falling one short of his double century at Lord's on the 6 June. He finished the season with 1320 first-class runs, at an average of 47.14.

He captained Northants in first-class cricket in 2013 and 2014, overseeing the team's promotion into Division 1, and their immediate relegation the following year. He retired from professional cricket in August 2015. In all, he passed the milestone of a thousand first-class runs in a season in four separate seasons.
