= Stephen Moore (cricketer) =

English cricketer (born 1980)

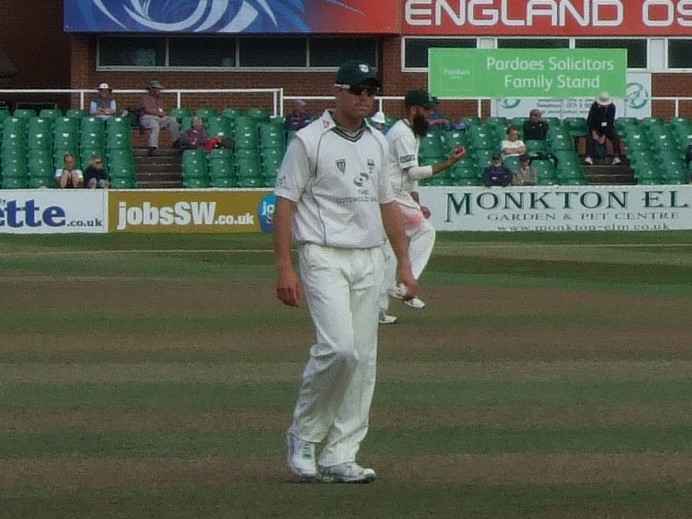

Personal information
- Full name: Stephen Colin Moore
- Born: 4 November 1980 (age 46); Johannesburg, Transvaal Province, South Africa
- Nickname: Mandy
- Height: 6 ft 1 in (185 cm)
- Batting: Right-handed
- Bowling: Right arm medium

Domestic team information
- Years: Team
- 2003–2009: Worcestershire
- 2010–2013: Lancashire
- 2014: Derbyshire

Career statistics
Competition	FC	LA	T20
Matches	155	141	99
Runs scored	9,390	3,774	2,340
Batting average	36.25	30.68	28.53
100s/50s	18/45	5/25	0/16
Top score	246	118	83*
Balls bowled	342	41	–
Wickets	5	1	–
Bowling average	64.20	53.00	–
5 wickets in innings	0	0	–
10 wickets in match	0	0	–
Best bowling	1/13	1/1	–
Catches/stumpings	78/–	38/–	28/–
- Source: CricketArchive, 4 March 2014

Stephen Colin Moore (born 11 November 1980) is a retired English cricketer. Moore is a right-handed opening batsman (and part-time right-arm medium pace bowler) who played first-class cricket most recently for Derbyshire County Cricket Club in 2014. He previously played for Worcestershire from 2003 until 2009 and Lancashire County Cricket Club from 2009 until 2013. Educated at St Stithians College in Johannesburg and at Exeter University, from which he graduated MEng, Moore is also a keen saxophonist.

== Worcestershire ==
His highest score is 246, scored against Derbyshire in May 2005.

In 2008 he was the first player to reach 1,000 runs for the season, during the course of an innings of 139 against Gloucestershire. He finished the season as the highest scorer in first-class cricket with 1451 runs. When the Australians toured in 2009, one of their warm-up matches ahead of the Ashes was against the England Lions. Moore was selected in the team and against a bowling attack composed of Brett Lee, Mitchell Johnson, and Stuart Clark he registered an innings of 120.

== Lancashire ==
At the end of 2009 season Moore left Worcestershire, invoking a clause in his contract that allowed him to leave following the club's relegation from the first division of the County Championship. He was one of four players to leave the club. Soon after, Moores signed a two-year contract with Lancashire. Shortly after signing for Lancashire Moore was included in England's newly formed Performance Programme squad. The squad consisted of players on the fringes of international selection on standby to step into the full England squad in the event of an injury. In the event, Moore was not called up to the England squad.

In his first one-day game for Lancashire Moore scored 118 against Surrey in the CB40. Although Lancashire lost the match, Moore's innings was a personal best, eclipsing his previous highest score in the format of 105. It was his first one-day century since 2006. Moore followed up this success with a second century, this time against his old club. His innings of 105 not out in May guided Lancashire to a nine-wicket win over Worcestershire. His 2010 season came to a premature end in late July when he dislocated his shoulder while fielding in Lancashire's Twenty20 quarter-final. Surgery on the shoulder was required. While he experienced success in the one-day game up to that point in the season, averaging nearly 50 from seven matches, Moore's performance in the County Championship was below par, scoring 426 runs from nine matches with two half-centuries and a highest score of 61.

The opening fixture of the 2011 season was the Marylebone Cricket Club (MCC) against county champions Nottinghamshire in Abu Dhabi in March. Moore was one of two Lancashire players to be selected for the MCC, and it marked Moore's return to competitive cricket since his shoulder injury the previous year. Moore scored his first County Championship for Lancashire in the penultimate round of the 2011 competition. His innings of 169 not out helped Lancashire to a 222-run win over Hampshire. In the final match of the season Lancashire won the County Championship and afterwards Moore was awarded his county cap. He scored 1,013 runs in the County Championship at an average of 40.52, including 71 in Lancashire's run-chase to win their final match. After averaging 34.80 in Lancashire's 17 T20 matches in 2011, Moore had attracted interest from several Indian Premier League teams. Initially set to be part of the player auction for the fifth edition of the competition, he chose to withdraw as it clashed with eight of Lancashire's County Championship games in the 2012 English cricket season and instead chose to concentrate on playing for Lancashire.

During an innings of 77 from 66 balls in Lancashire's loss to the Netherlands in the 2012 CB40, Moore reached 3,000 runs in List A cricket.

At the end of 2013, Moore was released by Lancashire.

== Derbyshire ==
Moore signed a two-year deal with Derbyshire prior to the 2014 season, but announced his retirement with immediate effect in June 2014.
