= Vikram Solanki =

English cricketer

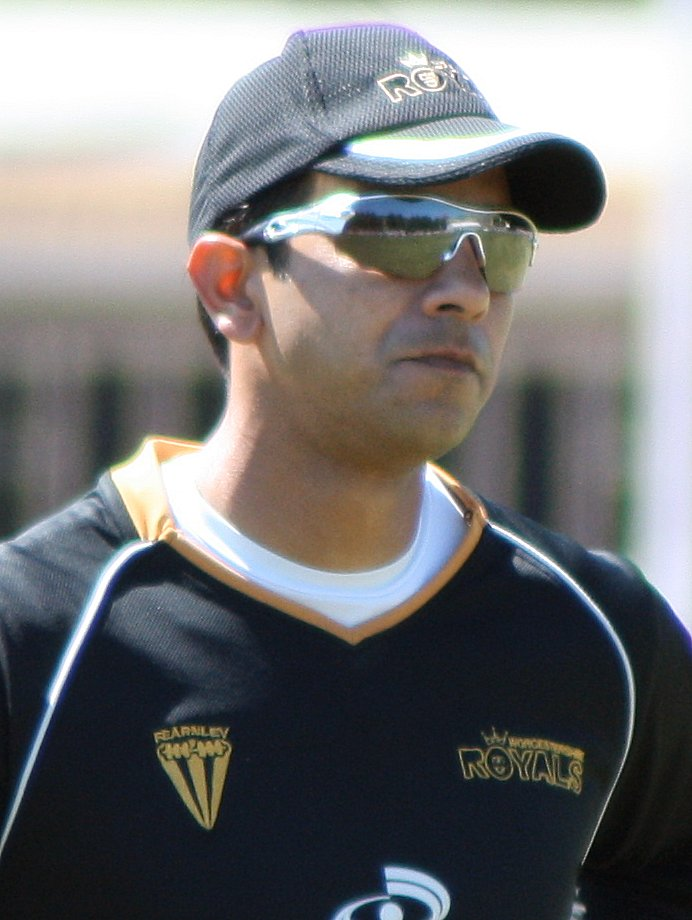

Personal information
- Full name: Vikram Singh Solanki
- Born: 1 April 1976 (age 50); Udaipur, Rajasthan, India
- Height: 6 ft 0 in (1.83 m)
- Batting: Right-handed
- Bowling: Right-arm off break
- Role: Batsman

International information
- National side: England (2000–2007)
- ODI debut (cap 156): 23 January 2000 v South Africa
- Last ODI: 1 July 2006 v Sri Lanka
- ODI shirt no.: 38
- T20I debut (cap 8): 13 June 2005 v Australia
- Last T20I: 19 September 2007 v India

Domestic team information
- Years: Team
- 1995–2012: Worcestershire (squad no. 3)
- 2006/07: Rajasthan
- 2013–2015: Surrey (squad no. 42)

Career statistics
Competition	ODI	T20I	FC	LA
Matches	51	3	325	402
Runs scored	1,097	76	18,359	11,045
Batting average	26.75	25.33	35.78	32.39
100s/50s	2/5	0/0	34/98	16/64
Top score	106	43	270	164*
Balls bowled	111	0	7,238	1,122
Wickets	1	–	90	28
Bowling average	105.00	–	47.00	35.25
5 wickets in innings	0	–	4	0
10 wickets in match	0	–	1	0
Best bowling	1/17	–	5/40	4/14
Catches/stumpings	16/–	3/–	350/–	162/–
- Source: Cricinfo, 30 March 2017

Vikram Singh Solanki (born 1 April 1976) is an English cricket coach and former first-class cricketer. In limited over international cricket, he played over 50 One Day Internationals for England as a batsman and occasional off-spinner.

In county cricket, he played for Surrey, having previously spent 17 years at Worcestershire. In 2007, he became the 24th Worcestershire batsman to pass 10,000 career runs for the county. He also captained Worcestershire from 2005 to 2010, before resigning mid-season.

In September 2015 he announced his retirement as a player. After obtaining an LLB from the Open University, Vikram then studied the Legal Practice Course at the University of Law.

Vikram Solanki has held a variety of coaching and administrative roles apart from his playing career. In March 2009 he was appointed Chairman of The Professional Cricketer's Association, where he also held the role of Interim Chief Executive and in March 2017 he became FICA President, succeeding former West Indian International, Jimmy Adams.

== Early life and domestic career ==
Solanki was born in Udaipur, Rajasthan, India, but moved to Wolverhampton with his family at the age of eight. Solanki played junior and senior cricket for Wolverhampton cricket club and education from Regis School, Wolverhampton.

He made his first-class debut for Worcestershire in 1995, although he had played one-day cricket for the county two seasons earlier. In 1996 he was awarded the NBC Denis Compton Award. Although principally taken on by Worcestestershire as a batsman, on his first-class debut, due to there being no fit spinners available, he was selected to bowl his off breaks – something he had done with a degree of success the previous winter while on tour with England U19. Although generally an occasional bowler, Solanki produced a ten-wicket haul, five wickets in each innings, against Lancashire at Old Trafford in 1996. In 1999 he achieved a batting average of over 40, something he repeated in 2000, 2002, 2004 and 2006. 2006 was also the first season since 2000 in which he managed to top 1,000 first-class runs, making 1,252.

Together with Worcestershire teammate Kabir Ali, Solanki accepted an offer to play for Rajasthan in the Indian Ranji Trophy during the 2006–07 season. Solanki joined the Indian Cricket League (ICL) in 2007, he made six appearances for the Mumbai Champs in his single season of ICL.

=== England A tours ===
Solanki was picked for two England A tours: to South Africa and Zimbabwe in 1998–99, and to Bangladesh and New Zealand in 1999–2000. His fine performances on these latter tours led to his making his full One Day International debut against the South Africans later that same winter. However, he was unable to translate his A-team feats into runs for the senior England side, and after eight innings yielding just 96 runs, he was dropped and not picked again for more than three years.

== English county cricket ==
Solanki was also an occasional bowler of off-spin for Worcestershire, although he has only bowled a handful of overs for England. Worcestershire appointed Solanki as captain of the county for 2005, succeeding the retiring Steve Rhodes. In September 2006 he agreed an extension to his contract which saw him remain at the county until 2009. Following a defeat by Glamorgan on 12 August 2010, he announced his resignation as captain with immediate effect stating that "it was time for somebody else to be at the helm".

After showing good form in the first half of the 2009 season Solanki was called up to the England Lions squad for their fixture against Australia.

In July 2012, it was announced that Solanki would leave Worcestershire at the expiry of his contract in September, and join Surrey on a two-year contract. He announced his retirement from the first-class game at the end of the 2015 season, during which he played in only one County Championship match.

== International career ==
Solanki represented England on 51 occasions in one-day cricket, but was never selected for a Test match. His natural talent only rarely came through into his performances for his country, and his England batting average was in the mid-20s. He made two international hundreds, 106 off 108 balls against South Africa at The Oval in 2003 (when he shared an opening partnership of 200 with Marcus Trescothick), and exactly 100 off 93 balls versus Zimbabwe at Bulawayo in 2004/05.

Solanki played in four of the five One Day Internationals when England toured Pakistan in December 2005, his best score of 49 also being the highest in England's innings in the final match, which England went on to win by 6 wickets. However, Solanki was not selected for the team to go on the tour to India, instead being chosen to captain the 'A' team in the West Indies.

On 1 July 2006, Solanki took his first wicket in ODIs at Headingley, removing Sri Lankan opener Sanath Jayasuriya for 152. It was something of a hollow triumph, however, as Jayasuriya and Upul Tharanga (109) had put on 286, a world record for the first wicket in ODIs, and England were crushed as Sri Lanka scored 324/2 to win by eight wickets in just 37.3 overs. Solanki made history against Australia in 2005 when he became the first supersub in a One Day International, replacing Simon Jones to strengthen England's tail after a batting collapse; coming to the crease at no.8 with England 93/6, Solanki made 53 not out. He also took part in the final two matches of England's time in the 2007 Twenty20 World Championship, replacing the injured Matt Prior. Keeping wicket and opening the batting in both of his matches in that tournament, he took two catches in the first, conceded no byes in either match, and scored 24 and 43. Those were his last international appearances.

== Coaching career ==
In January 2018, Solanki was appointed as Deputy Head coach at Surrey CCC, and in June 2020 he was promoted as Head coach by Surrey's Director of Cricket, Alec Stewart, in succession to Michael di Venuto.

In IPL 2019, he was a member of the Royal Challengers Bangalore's coaching staff, where he worked as an Assistant coach.

In January 2022, Solanki ended his nine-year association with the Surrey CCC after being appointed as the Director of Cricket of the newly added IPL franchise Gujarat Titans ahead of the Mega Auction 2022.

== Career milestones ==
- 22 June 1995: First-class debut for Worcestershire: v Hampshire at the County Ground, Southampton
- 16 May 1997: Maiden first-class century: 128* v Oxford University at The Parks, Oxford
- 23 January 2000: One Day International debut: v South Africa at Bloemfontein, South Africa
- 28 June 2003: Maiden ODI century: 106 v South Africa, The Oval, London
- 1 August 2008: Highest First-Class Innings: 270 v Gloucestershire, Cheltenham
- 24 June 2009: First T20 century: 100 v Glamorgan, New Road, Worcester

Sporting positions
Preceded by Steve Rhodes	Worcestershire County Cricket Captain; 2005–2010	Succeeded by Daryl Mitchell
Preceded by Dougie Brown	Chairman of the Professional Cricketers' Association; 2009–2012	Succeeded by Mark Wallace
