= 2004 English cricket season =

County Championship
- Champions: Warwickshire
- Runners-up: Kent
- Most runs: Brad Hodge (1,548)
- Most wickets: Mushtaq Ahmed (82)

Cheltenham & Gloucester Trophy
- Champions: Gloucestershire Gladiators
- Runners-up: Worcestershire Royals
- Most runs: Craig Spearman (364)
- Most wickets: Dougie Brown (13)

totesport League
- Champions: Glamorgan Dragons
- Runners-up: Lancashire Lightning
- Most runs: Paul Weekes (807)
- Most wickets: Simon Cook (39)

Twenty20 Cup
- Champions: Leicestershire Foxes
- Runners-up: Surrey Lions
- Most runs: Darren Maddy (356)
- Most wickets: Adam Hollioake (20)

PCA Player of the Year
- Andrew Flintoff

Wisden Cricketers of the Year
- Ashley Giles; Steve Harmison; Rob Key; Andrew Strauss; Marcus Trescothick

The 2004 English cricket season was the 105th in which the County Championship had been an official competition. England recorded a 4–0 Test series whitewash over the West Indies and a comfortable 3–0 win over New Zealand. Their one-day form was sporadic, however. In the Natwest Trophy, they failed to make the final, which saw New Zealand defeat the West Indies by 107 runs. In the Natwest Challenge, they beat India 2–1. In domestic cricket, Warwickshire won the County Championship.

== Honours ==
- County Championship - Warwickshire
- C&G Trophy - Gloucestershire
- National League - Glamorgan
- Twenty20 Cup - Leicestershire
- Minor Counties Championship - Bedfordshire and Devon shared title
- MCCA Knockout Trophy - Berkshire
- Second XI Championship - Somerset II
- Second XI Trophy - Worcestershire II
- Wisden Cricketers of the Year - Ashley Giles, Steve Harmison, Rob Key, Andrew Strauss, Marcus Trescothick

== Events ==
After scoring 642 in the first innings of their County Championship against Glamorgan at the County Ground in September, Essex lose the match by 4 wickets. Essex's total of 642 is the highest total in the first innings of a first-class match by the losing team.

== Annual reviews ==
- Playfair Cricket Annual 2005
- Wisden Cricketers' Almanack 2005
