= 2003 English cricket season =

The 2003 English cricket season was the 104th in which the County Championship had been an official competition. It was notable for the first official County Championship of the oldest county club, Sussex, and the first Twenty20 championship, the Twenty20 Cup.

South Africa toured England to compete in a test series which was drawn 2-2. Zimbabwe also toured England to compete in a two match test series with England. England won 2–0.

== Honours ==
- County Championship - Sussex
- C&G Trophy - Gloucestershire
- National League - Surrey
- Twenty20 Cup - Surrey
- Minor Counties Championship - Lincolnshire
- MCCA Knockout Trophy - Cambridgeshire
- Second XI Championship - Yorkshire II
- Second XI Trophy - Hampshire II
- Wisden - Chris Adams, Andrew Flintoff, Ian Harvey, Gary Kirsten, Graeme Smith

== Annual reviews ==
- Playfair Cricket Annual 2004
- Wisden Cricketers' Almanack 2004
