= West Midlands bus route 360 =

Bus route in Coventry, England

360
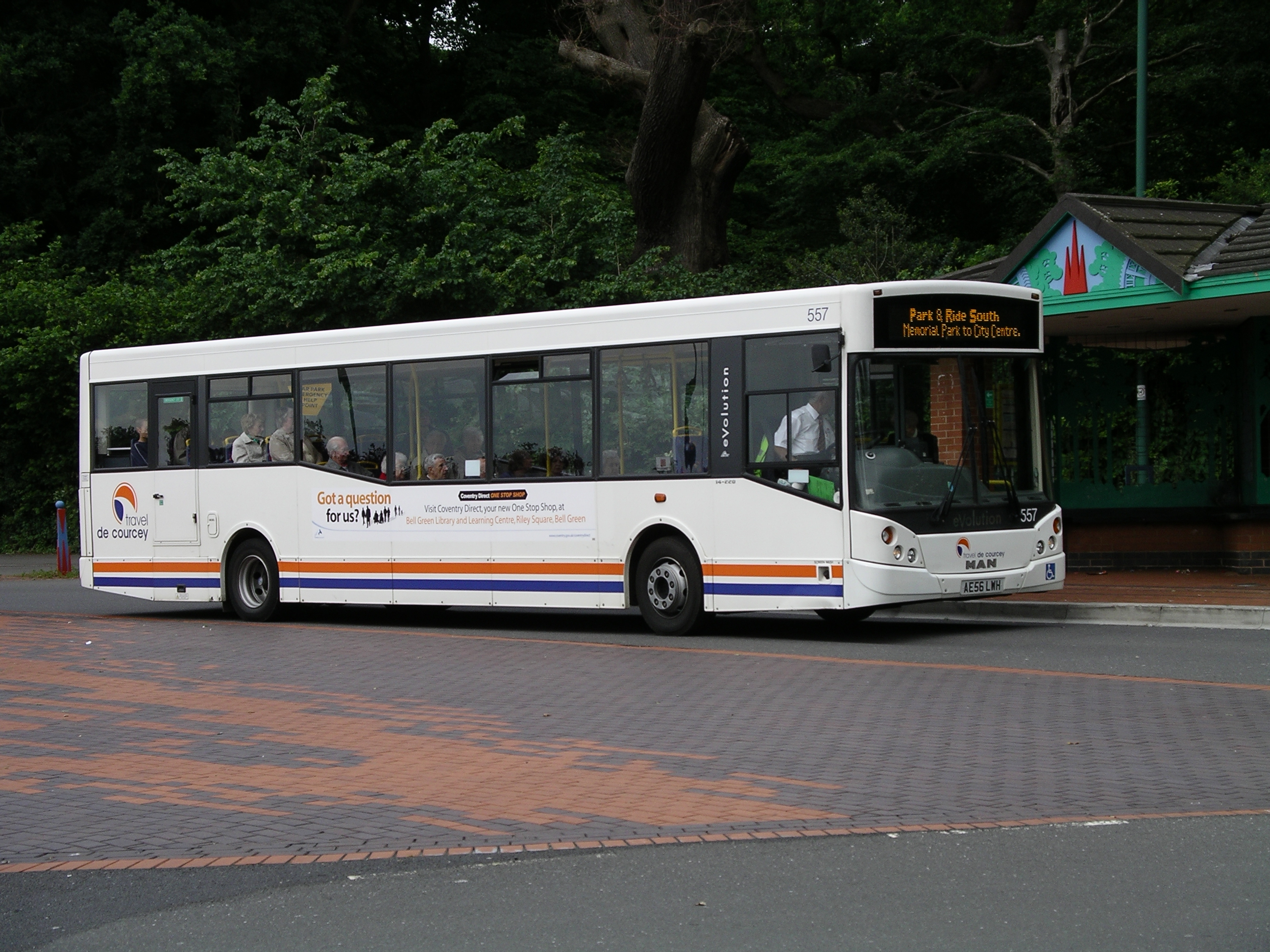
- Travel de Courcey MCV Evolution bodied MAN 14.220 in May 2007

Overview
- Operator: Travel de Courcey
- Predecessors: 701 & 801

Route
- Start: University Hospital Coventry
- Via: Willenhall; Whitely; University of Warwick; Whoberley; Whitmore Park; Ricoh Arena (aka the Coventry Building Society Arena)
- End: Arena Park Shopping Centre
- Length: 31 miles

Service
- Frequency: 30 minutes

West Midlands bus route 360 was a 31-mile route that circumnavigated Coventry. Operated by Travel de Courcey, it was the longest urban bus route in Europe.

== History ==
Route 360 commenced operating on 9 June 2013 replacing routes 701 and 801. It operated in both clockwise and anti-clockwise directions as routes 360C and 360A.

It ceased on 23 July 2016, and was replaced by three routes:

- 43: University of Warwick to Eastern Green
- 60: University of Warwick to Arena Park Shopping Centre via Coventry & Warwickshire University Hospital
- 61: Allesley Park to Arena Park Shopping Centre

It was ceased due to low passenger numbers.

== Route ==
Route 360 operated via these primary locations:

- University Hospital Coventry
- Willenhall
- Jaguar Land Rover, Whitley
- University of Warwick
- Tile Hill station
- Whoberley
- Whitmore Park
- Ricoh Arena (aka CBS Arena)
- Arena Park Shopping Centre
