= War Memorial Athletic Ground =

Sports ground in Stourbridge, England

Coordinates: 52°27′45″N 2°09′05″W

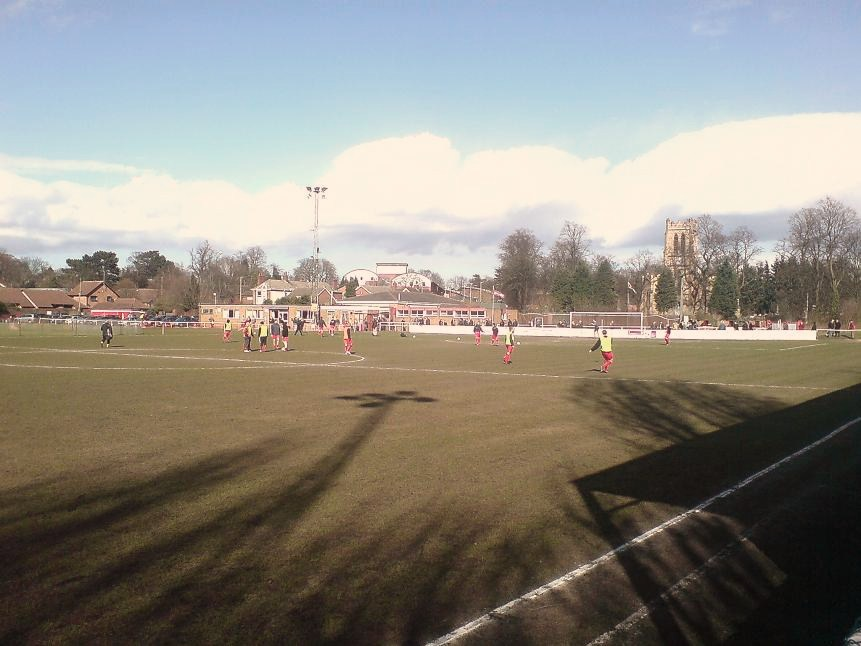
- Interactive map of War Memorial Athletic Ground
- Address: High Street; Amblecote, Stourbridge, West Midlands
- Capacity: 2,626
- Type: Cricket and Football

Construction
- Opened: Early 19th Century

The War Memorial Athletic Ground, often referred to as simply the War Memorial Ground, is a sports ground in the Amblecote region of Stourbridge, West Midlands, England. It plays host to both cricket and football, being the home of Stourbridge Cricket Club and Stourbridge Football Club.

A war memorial archway which forms the entrance to the sports ground, was designed by the Stourbridge Borough Surveyor, Geoffrey Ince, at a cost of £220 and was unveiled in December 1928.

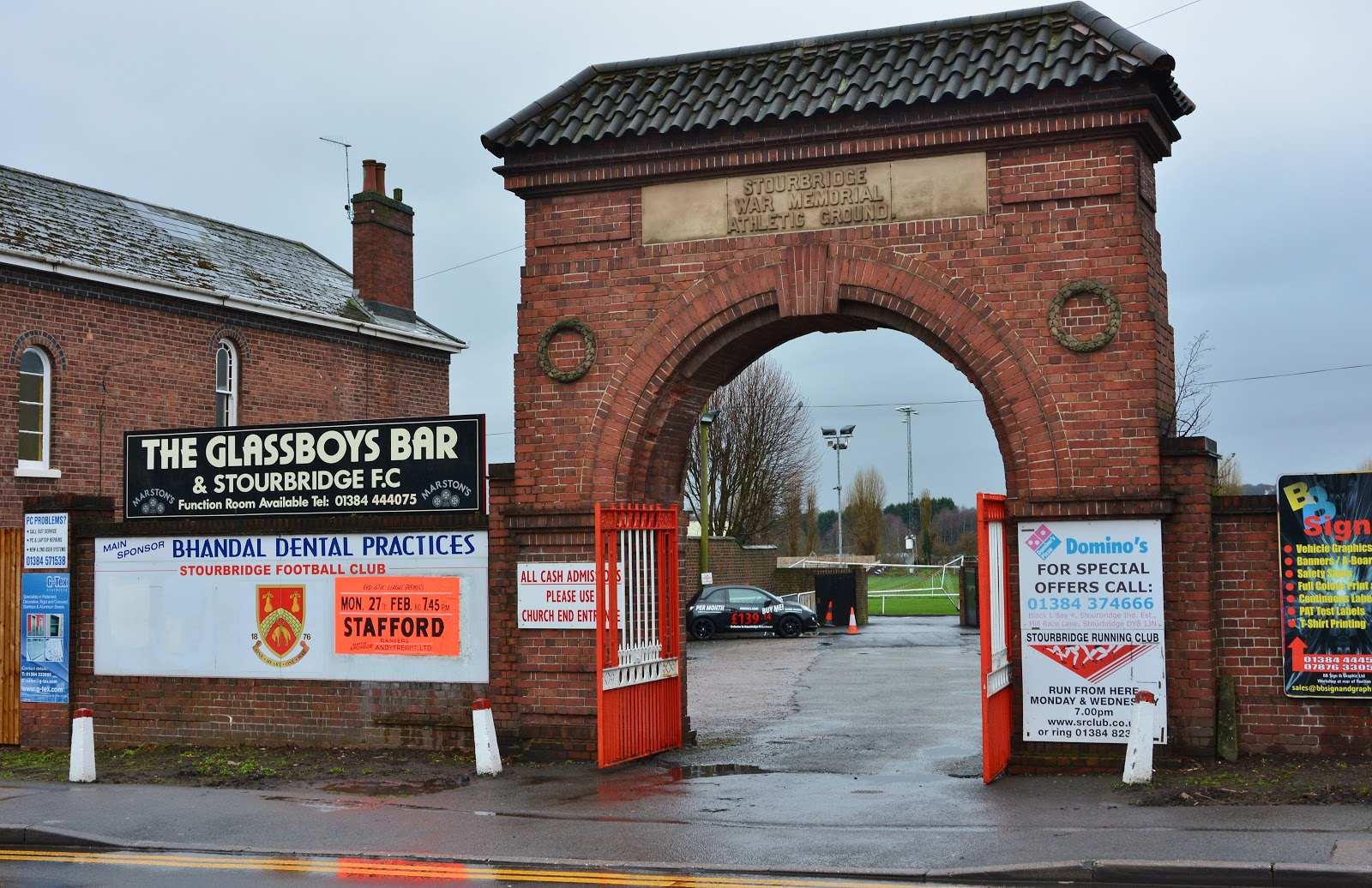
War Memorial Archway at the entrance to the ground

== Cricket ==
=== International ===
Two ICC Trophy matches have been played at the War Memorial Ground: Bermuda v Papua New Guinea in 1979, and Argentina v East Africa in 1986. The ground also hosted a match in the 1997 Triple Crown Tournament, between an England Cricket Board XI and Ireland.

=== Domestic ===
Worcestershire County Cricket Club played 61 first-class matches at the ground: 60 between 1905 and 1962, and a further one in 1981. All these games were in the County Championship. Only three List A games have been played here, in 1969, 1970 and 1982, again all involving Worcestershire. The county played Second XI cricket at the ground into the early 1990s.

On this ground in 1911, Worcestershire lost to Lancashire by 372 runs, which as of the beginning of the 2009 season remains the county's largest ever defeat in terms of runs. In 1909 Frank Woolley and Arthur Fielder shared a partnership of 235 for Kent's 10th wicket, a stand which remains the highest for the 10th wicket in the County Championship as of 2021 and the fourth-highest of all time.

=== Records ===
==== First-class ====
- Highest team total: 592/9 declared by Lancashire v Worcestershire, 1909
- Lowest team total: 43 by Worcestershire v Kent, 1913
- Highest individual innings: 217 by Frederick Bowley for Worcestershire v Leicestershire, 1905
- Best bowling in an innings: 9-40 by Reg Perks for Worcestershire v Glamorgan, 1939

==== List A ====
- Highest team total: 164/9 (40 overs) by Worcestershire v Leicestershire, 1970
- Lowest team total: 104 (37.5 overs) by Glamorgan v Worcestershire, 1969
- Highest individual innings: 58 by Nigel Briers for Leicestershire v Worcestershire, 1982
- Best bowling in an innings: 4-24 by Bob Carter for Worcestershire v Leicestershire, 1970

== Football ==
The War Memorial Athletic Ground is also the home of Stourbridge F.C. since 1888.

The ground hosted League One team Walsall in the FA Cup first round on 7 November 2009. The match finished in a 0-1 loss for Stourbridge.

It hosted a first round FA Cup replay between Stourbridge and Plymouth Argyle on 22 November 2011. Stourbridge won the match 2-0.

On 13 December 2016 the ground hosted a second round FA Cup match between Stourbridge and Northampton Town. The match ended with a 1-0 win for Stourbridge, sending the club into the FA Cup third round for the first time in the club’s history.
