= Roy Booth =

English cricketer (1926–2018)

Personal information
- Full name: Roy Booth
- Born: 1 October 1926; Marsden, West Riding of Yorkshire, England
- Died: 24 September 2018 (aged 91)
- Batting: Right-handed
- Bowling: Right-arm medium
- Role: Wicketkeeper-batsman

Career statistics
Competition	First-class	List A
Matches	468	14
Runs scored	10,134	160
Batting average	18.90	16.00
100s/50s	2/24	–/1
Top score	113*	55
Balls bowled	12	–
Wickets	–	–
Bowling average	–	–
5 wickets in innings	–	–
10 wickets in match	–	n/a
Best bowling	–	–
Catches/stumpings	948/178	28/2
- Source: CricketArchive

Roy Booth (1 October 1926 – 24 September 2018) was an English first-class cricketer, who played for both Yorkshire and Worcestershire. He was born at Marsden, West Riding of Yorkshire.

A product of Golcar Cricket Club, where he lived most of his early life, he was professional with Lightcliffe from 1948 to 1953 and 1955. A specialist wicket-keeper, he took 948 catches and completed 178 stumpings in a first-class career of 468 games between 1951 and 1970. He took another 28 catches and made two stumpings in his List A one-day matches.

== Career ==
Booth came late to first-class cricket, not making his debut for his native Yorkshire until he was 24, and was a fringe player in the Yorkshire team until the retirement of Don Brennan at the end of the 1953 season. He was then first choice for Yorkshire in 1954 and in the first half of 1955, but lost his place mid-season to Jimmy Binks.

He joined Worcestershire on special registration for the 1956 season, won his county cap in his first season and was then the regular wicket-keeper for the team for the next thirteen seasons, during which time the county achieved greater success than at any time before. The side came second in the County Championship for the first time in 1962 and two years later went one better, winning the title for the first time. They retained the Championship in 1965.

Booth's contribution to the success was substantial. Taller than many wicket-keepers of the period, he seemed well-equipped to handle Worcestershire's battery of fast-medium bowlers in the late 1950s, led by Jack Flavell and Len Coldwell. But the emergence from 1960 of a more balanced bowling attack, with the arrival of first Doug Slade and then Norman Gifford, both slow left-arm, not only gave Worcestershire a Championship-winning edge but also showed Booth to be among the best all-round wicket-keepers in the country at the time. Despite his record, he appears never to have been close to Test selection, as the long-standing Godfrey Evans was succeeded as England wicketkeeper by a series of players (Roy Swetman, John Murray, Geoff Millman, Jim Parks) a few years younger than Booth.

Booth set records for both season and career dismissals for Worcestershire, though his career total has since been overtaken by Steve Rhodes. He is the last wicket-keeper to have completed 100 dismissals in an English first-class season, and achieved this feat twice, in 1960, when he made 101 dismissals and in the Championship-winning season of 1964, when he made exactly 100 dismissals. With the reduction in first-class matches that has taken place in the years since, it is unlikely that this feat will ever be repeated, and Booth is one of only seven keepers to have achieved this milestone.

Booth had no great reputation for batting when he joined Worcestershire, having made only one score of more than 50 in five seasons with Yorkshire. But he turned himself into a highly effective lower middle-order batsman with a very upright stance and a "correct" batting style. In 1959, he made 1,042 runs, the only time he passed 1,000 runs in a season – though two years later, in 1961, he was within two runs of a potential record. In this season, he made 998 runs with just one innings of over 50 and a highest score of just 54: had he scored those two runs, he would have had the "lowest highest score" of any player completing 1,000 runs in an English season, a record at present held by his Worcestershire colleague, Dick Richardson.

Booth maintained form and fitness into his forties, and acted as deputy captain for some years before his retirement at the end of the 1968 season. He returned for four first-class matches, and one List A game, in an injury crisis in 1970.

He was a good footballer with Yorkshire Amateurs, and had trials with Burnley F.C.

== Post-retirement ==
Booth later worked for Worcestershire by serving on the committee for many years and held a term as club president. His wife Joyce ran the Ladies' Pavilion at New Road for over twenty years. He died on Monday, 24 September 2018 and a minute's silence was held at New Road before the Worcestershire v Yorkshire match began.
