= Bob Carter (cricketer, born 1937) =

English cricketer (born 1937)

Personal information
- Full name: Robert George Mallaby Carter
- Born: 11 July 1937 (age 89); Horden, County Durham, England
- Batting: Left-handed
- Bowling: Right-arm fast-medium

Domestic team information
- Years: Team
- 1961–1972: Worcestershire
- 1973: Marylebone Cricket Club (MCC)

Career statistics
| Competition | FC | LA |
|---|---|---|
| Matches | 178 | 49 |
| Runs scored | 324 | 20 |
| Batting average | 4.62 | 4.00 |
| 100s/50s | 0/0 | 0/0 |
| Top score | 23 | 5* |
| Balls bowled | 29,149 | 2,329 |
| Wickets | 523 | 63 |
| Bowling average | 26.22 | 22.93 |
| 5 wickets in innings | 17 | 1 |
| 10 wickets in match | 2 | N/A |
| Best bowling | 7/61 | 5/27 |
| Catches/stumpings | 55/0 | 3/0 |
- Source: CricketArchive, 21 November 2008

Robert George Mallaby Carter (born 11 July 1937), is a former English cricketer who played first-class and List A cricket for Worcestershire. He was capped by the county in 1965, and was awarded a benefit season in 1973, which raised about £7,000. All but two of his 523 first-class wickets came for Worcestershire; the others were obtained for Marylebone Cricket Club (MCC) in the very last game of his career. Carter's batting was generally extremely poor, as evidenced by his career batting average of under five in both forms of the game, although he did play one significant – if ultimately fruitless – innings. In the 1963 Gillette Cup final against Sussex at Lord's, he came to the wicket with Worcestershire 133/9, needing 35 runs to win. In fading light, he and wicket-keeper Roy Booth added 21 before Carter was run out to end the match. Carter also played in a critical close finish the following season against Nottinghamshire, where he and Flavell managed to get home by a single wicket and virtually seal the county's first Championship title.

Carter did not make his debut until the age of nearly 24, when he played for Worcestershire against Oxford University in early June 1961, taking four wickets in the second innings. That was his only first-team appearance of the season, and County Championship appearances had to wait until 1962, when he became a regular in the side from mid-season onward, finishing with a more than handy 70 wickets at 22.07 apiece. He was in fact to exceed this aggregate only once, in 1971 when he claimed 79 successes.

For the early part of his career, Carter was somewhat overshadowed by his more illustrious teammates Len Coldwell and Jack Flavell, but nevertheless managed to make many appearances, especially when his England teammates were injured or engaged on Test duties. In 1965, the year in which he was capped, he turned in a remarkable performance against Lancashire. Having come into the team in place of Coldwell, who had been injured, in the second innings Carter returned an analysis of 4.1–2–7–6, including a hat-trick, as Lancashire were dismissed for 55.

Throughout the rest of the 1960s Carter was in and out of the eleven, with the nearest he got to being a regular in 1968, when he played eighteen times. For the most part he chipped in with useful wickets without producing anything really special. However, in 1971 he enjoyed his best season: in 27 first-class games he took 79 wickets at just over 30, but he also found the increasing importance of one-day cricket to his liking. Worcestershire won the John Player League that season, and Carter played all but one match in the campaign. He achieved career-best innings returns in both forms of the game during 1971: 7/61 in the Championship against Yorkshire at Dudley (the last-ever first-class match at the ground), and 5/27 against Sussex in the John Player League.

Carter's Worcestershire career came to an abrupt end midway through the 1972 season, and he was to play only one more first-class game, for Marylebone Cricket Club (MCC) against Kent in May 1973. This, Carter's only appearance in top-class cricket for a side other than Worcestershire, saw him end on the losing side: a second-innings duck saw Kent record an 8-run victory. He took only two wickets in the game, but they were not bad ones with which to bow out: he accounted for Colin Cowdrey in both innings!
