= Worcestershire County Cricket Club =

English cricket club

- One Day name: Worcestershire Rapids

Personnel
- Captain: Brett D'Oliveira
- One Day captain: Adam Hose (T20)
- Coach: Alan Richardson

Team information
- Founded: 1865; 161 years ago
- Home ground: New Road
- Capacity: 5,500

History
- First-class debut: Yorkshire in 1899
- Championship wins: 5
- Pro40 wins: 4
- FP Trophy wins: 1
- VitalityHealth Twenty20 Cup wins: 1
- B&H Cup wins: 1
- OD Cup wins: 1
- Official website: WCCC
First-class
One-day & T20

Worcestershire County Cricket Club is one of eighteen first-class county clubs within the domestic cricket structure of England and Wales. It represents the historic county of Worcestershire. Its Vitality Blast T20 team has been rebranded the Worcestershire Rapids, but the county is known by most fans as 'the Pears'. The club is based at New Road, Worcester. Founded in 1865, Worcestershire held minor status at first and was a prominent member of the early Minor Counties Championship in the 1890s, winning the competition three times. In 1899, the club joined the County Championship and the team was elevated to first-class status. Since then, Worcestershire have played in every top-level domestic cricket competition in England except the 1919 County Championship.

== Honours ==
=== First XI honours ===
- County Championship (5) – 1964, 1965, 1974, 1988, 1989

Division Two (2) – 2003, 2017

- Gillette/NatWest/C&G/Friends Provident Trophy (1) – 1994
- Metrobank One Day Cup - 2025
- Vitality T20 Blast (1) – 2018
- Sunday/Pro 40 League (4) – 1971, 1987, 1988, 2007
- Benson & Hedges Cup (1) – 1991
- Minor Counties Championship (3) – 1896, 1897, 1898; shared (1) – 1895

=== Second XI honours ===
- Second XI Championship (3) – 1962, 1963, 1982
- Second XI Trophy (1) – 2004

== History ==
=== Earliest cricket ===
Cricket may have been played in Worcestershire during the 18th century, however the earliest reference to cricket in the county is 1829 and the county cricket club was not formed until 1865.

A match on 28 August 1844 at Hartlebury Common between Worcestershire and Shropshire is the earliest known instance of a county team in Worcestershire. Two years later, XXII of Worcestershire played William Clarke's All England Eleven at Powick Hams.

=== Origin of the club ===
Worcestershire CCC was formed on 4 March 1865 at the Star Hotel (now the Whitehouse) in Worcester.

The club owes much to Paul Foley who was from a family of iron masters in Stourbridge. He also owned an agricultural estate at Stoke Edith in Herefordshire. He became involved with the club in the 1880s and helped to establish the Minor Counties Championship which began in 1895. Worcestershire shared the inaugural title with Durham and Norfolk before winning outright in 1896, 1897 and 1898.

With this success behind it, the club applied for first-class status and entered the County Championship in 1899. Worcestershire CCC played its initial first-class match versus Yorkshire CCC on 4, 5 and 6 May 1899.

=== The first-class county ===
The inclusion of Worcestershire increased the County Championship to 15 teams. At first they performed moderately despite the superb batting of Tip Foster, who could rarely play after 1901. Weak bowling on perfect New Road pitches was responsible for this, but in 1907 when Tip Foster played regularly for three months their batting, considering the difficulty of the pitches, was among the finest of any county team. Their best performance that year was an innings of 567 on a somewhat difficult pitch against Fielder and Blythe of Kent CCC. After that year, however, the batting was never strong enough to make up for woefully weak bowling.

Worcestershire were so weak the club could not compete in the Championship in 1919, and their form in 1920 – when they lost three successive games by an innings and over 200 runs – was probably the worst of any county side. Their form, with one remarkable exception, was woeful up to the early thirties. Fred Root, one of the first exponents of leg theory bowling, took over 1,500 wickets for the county and was a Test standard player in an otherwise fourth-rate team. In Cyril Walters and the Nawab of Pataudi the team acquired its first class batsmen since the Fosters, but both had to give up the game after playing brilliantly in 1933 – when the bowling was briefly very weak.

The emergence of Dick Howorth and Reg Perks in the 1930s, however, was built up so well that by 1947 Worcestershire were sufficiently strong in bowling to be competitive at county level even if their batting was not adequate for high honours. Roly Jenkins, with 183 wickets in 1949, gave them briefly the best attack in county cricket, but they soon declined again and their form in the 1950s was indifferent at best.

Their first period of great success came in the 1960s under the Presidency of Sir George Dowty and the captaincy of Don Kenyon, when the county won two County Championships thanks to the achievements of such players as Norman Gifford, Tom Graveney, Jack Flavell, Len Coldwell and Basil D'Oliveira. They were also losing finalist in the first ever Gillette Cup Final in 1963 – the inaugural limited overs knockout competition in England.

In 1971 Worcestershire won their first, and only, Sunday League title thanks largely to the bowling of Vanburn Holder. Along with the runs of New Zealander Glenn Turner, the Barbadian's 87 wickets was also instrumental in winning Worcestershire's third championship win in 1974. In the 1980s, the prodigious batting feats of Graeme Hick and the arrival of Ian Botham paved the way for two more county titles in 1988 and 1989 – the same year in which they beat the touring Australians inside two days. Worcestershire also won the Sunday League in 1987 and 1988.

Worcestershire's success continued into the 1990s, with a first ever success in the Benson and Hedges Cup in 1991, following final defeats in 1973, 1976 and 1990. Captained by Phil Neale, the Pears beat Lancashire by 65 runs in the final at Lord's, gaining revenge for defeat against Lancashire in the previous year's competition. Worcestershire's next title came in 1994 when they won the Natwest Trophy, beating arch-rivals Warwickshire in the final. Not only did they avenge their defeat at the hands of Warwickshire in the B&H Cup Final earlier that summer but it was also their first success in the competition after three previous final defeats. Worcestershire's best showing in the County Championship came in 1993 when they finished second to Middlesex. Worcestershire finished 15th in 1999, the final year of single division County Championship cricket, meaning they would start the new millennium in Division Two.

=== The modern day (2000–present) ===
Worcestershire failed to gain promotion in 2000, despite overseas signing Glenn McGrath taking 76 Championship wickets at an average of 13.77. In 2003, Worcestershire were promoted to County Championship Division One for the first time after winning the Division Two title. Worcestershire also reached the final of the Cheltenham & Gloucester trophy, beating Lancashire in a memorable semi-final at New Road on 9 August 2003. There was disappointment in the Lord's final, though, as Worcestershire lost by seven wickets and the Pears were also relegated from Division One of the National League. 2004 was a yo-yo year with Worcestershire relegated in the County Championship, promoted back to Division One in the rebranded totesport League and losing finalists again in the C&G Trophy. Vikram Solanki scored centuries in both the semi-final win against Warwickshire and the final against Gloucestershire, but the 'Gladiators' won by eight wickets at Lord's.

In 2006, Worcestershire won promotion to the first division of the Championship on the last day of the season by beating Northamptonshire while their rivals for second promotion spot, Essex, lost to Leicestershire. However, their 2007 season began badly, including an innings-and-260-run loss to Yorkshire, Worcestershire's worst innings defeat since 1934. A flood-hit season inflicted serious financial damage, and on-field results in the Championship gave little cheer as Worcestershire were relegated. However, in the Pro40 First Division things were very different, and victory over Gloucestershire in mid-September brought the title to New Road, the county's first trophy since 1994. The feat was all the more remarkable for the fact that every one of Worcestershire's games was played away from their New Road home, due to the floods, with 'home' games played at Edgbaston, Taunton and Kidderminster.

2008 saw Worcestershire promoted back to Division One, despite losing their final game of the season. 2008 was also Graeme Hick's last season at Worcestershire, having scored 136 first-class centuries in 25 seasons at New Road. 2009 proved disastrous in first-class cricket, with Worcestershire finishing bottom of the First Division without a single victory, the first time the county had failed to win a Championship match since 1928.

Following a win on the last day of the season against Sussex, Worcestershire were promoted back to Division One in 2010. The following season they avoided relegation for the first time ever, giving them consecutive seasons in Division One. However, at the end of the 2012 season they were relegated back to Division Two. Worcestershire had a mixed campaign in 2013, finished fifth out of nine in Division Two but a bright start to the 2014 saw them second in the table after seven games, following a draw with Surrey in June. Worcestershire returned to Division One for the 2015 season, however their return only lasted one season as they were relegated after picking up only two wins. Worcestershire spent two years back in the second tier, before achieving promotion on 27 September 2017.

In 2025, Worcestershire won the One-Day Cup, defeating Hampshire by three wickets in a rain-affected final at Trent Bridge, but were also relegated from Division One of the County Championship.

== Sponsorship ==
Year	Kit Manufacturer	Shirt Sponsor
1993		MEB
1994		Powerline
1995		MEB
1996		MEB
1997		MEB
1998	Crusader Sport	Apollo 2000
1999	Crusader Sport	Apollo 2000
2000	Crusader Sport	Apollo 2000
2001	Crusader Sport	Apollo 2000
2002	Crusader Sport	Midlands Electricity
2003	Crusader Sport	Midlands Electricity
2004	Crusader Sport	Haier
2005	Crusader Sport	Apollo 2000
2006	Crusader Sport	Apollo 2000
2007	Crusader Sport	Apollo 2000
2008	Fearnley	Apollo 2000
2009	Fearnley	The Cotswold Group
2010	Fearnley	The Cotswold Group
2011	Fearnley	The Cotswold Group
2012	MKK Sport	The Cotswold Group
2013	MKK Sport	allpay
2014	MKK Sport	Royal Air Force
2015	Canterbury	Arctic Spas
2016	Canterbury	Arctic Spas
2017	Canterbury	Blackfinch Investments
2018	Gray-Nicolls	Blackfinch Investments
2019	Gray-Nicolls	Blackfinch Investments
2020	Gray-Nicolls	Blackfinch Investments
2021	Nike	Morgan Motor
2022	Nike	Morgan Motor
2023	Castore	A-plan Insurance (CC), Utility Stream (One-day) Langley Compass Group (T20) Pluxee (CC), WODR (One-day), Langley Compass Group (T20)
2024	Castore	A-plan Insurance (CC), Utility Stream (One-day) Langley Compass Group (T20) Pluxee (CC), WODR (One-day), Langley Compass Group (T20)

== Players ==
=== Current squad ===
- No. denotes the player's squad number, as worn on the back of their shirt.
- ‡ denotes players with international caps.

No.	Name	Nationality	Birth date	Batting style	Bowling style	Notes
Batters
2	Jake Libby	England	3 January 1993 (age 33)	Right-handed	Right-arm off break	
11	Rehaan Edavalath	England	4 March 2004 (age 22)	Right-handed	Right-arm off break	
18	Isaac Mohammed	England	30 April 2008 (age 18)	Left-handed	Right-arm medium	
25	Dan Lategan	South Africa	25 May 2006 (age 20)	Left-handed	Right-arm off break	Domestic player
27	Kashif Ali	England	7 February 1998 (age 28)	Right-handed	Right-arm leg break	
54	Adam Hose	England	25 October 1992 (age 34)	Right-handed	Right-arm medium	Captain (T20)
—	George Thomas	England	14 November 2003 (age 22)	Right-handed	Right-arm medium	
All-rounders
6	Matthew Waite	England	24 December 1995 (age 30)	Right-handed	Right-arm fast-medium	
12	Tom Taylor	England	21 December 1994 (age 31)	Right-handed	Right-arm fast-medium	
15	Brett D'Oliveira	England	28 February 1992 (age 34)	Right-handed	Right-arm leg break	Club captain
77	Ethan Brookes	England	23 May 2001 (age 25)	Right-handed	Right-arm fast-medium	
Wicket-keepers
9	Gareth Roderick	South Africa	29 August 1991 (age 35)	Right-handed	Right-arm medium	UK Passport
13	Henry Cullen	England	29 April 2003 (age 23)	Right-handed	—	
Bowlers
7	Fateh Singh	England	20 April 2004 (age 22)	Left-handed	Slow left-arm orthodox	
21	Ben Gibbon	England	9 June 2000 (age 26)	Right-handed	Left-arm fast-medium	
23	Usama Mir ‡	Pakistan	23 December 1995 (age 30)	Right-handed	Right-arm leg break	Domestic player; White ball contract
24	Jack Home	England	2 May 2006 (age 20)	Right-handed	Right-arm fast-medium	
35	George O'Connor	England	17 February 2004 (age 22)	Left-handed	Right-arm fast-medium	
61	Adam Finch	England	28 May 2000 (age 26)	Right-handed	Right-arm fast-medium	
65	Ben Allison	England	18 December 1999 (age 26)	Right-handed	Right-arm fast-medium	
—	Sam Greer	Australia	12 February 2002 (age 24)	Right-handed	Right-arm fast-medium	UK passport
Source: Updated: 27 September 2026

== Lists of players and club captains ==
- List of Worcestershire CCC players
- List of Worcestershire cricket captains

== County caps awarded ==
Note: Worcestershire no longer award traditional caps, instead awarding "colours" on a player's Championship debut.

1928: Harold Gibbons 1931: Peter Jackson 1931: Reg Perks 1934: Dick Howorth 1937: Edwin Cooper 1938: Phil King 1939: Roly Jenkins 1939: Charles Palmer 1946: Ronald Bird 1946: Allan White 1946: Bob Wyatt 1947: Don Kenyon 1947: Hugo Yarnold 1948: Laddie Outschoorn 1949: Michael Ainsworth 1950: George Chesterton 1950: George Dews 1951: Bob Broadbent 1952: Peter Richardson 1955: Jack Flavell 1955: Martin Horton 1956: Roy Booth 1956: Dick Richardson 1957: Bob Berry 1959: John Aldridge 1959: Len Coldwell 1959: Derek Pearson 1960: Doug Slade 1961: Norman Gifford 1961: Ron Headley 1962: Tom Graveney 1962: James Standen 1965: Robert Carter 1965: Basil D'Oliveira 1966: Brian Brain 1966: Alan Ormrod 1968: Glenn Turner 1969: Ted Hemsley	1970: Rodney Cass 1970: Vanburn Holder 1972: Jim Yardley 1974: John Parker 1976: Imran Khan 1976: John Inchmore 1978: James Cumbes 1978: David Humphries 1978: Phil Neale 1979: Dipak Patel 1979: Younis Ahmed 1980: Paul Pridgeon 1981: Hartley Alleyne 1984: Tim Curtis 1984: David Smith 1985: Damian D'Oliveira 1985: Neal Radford 1986: Graeme Hick 1986: Richard Illingworth 1986: Phil Newport 1986: Steve Rhodes 1986: Martin Weston 1987: Ian Botham 1987: Graham Dilley 1989: Stuart Lampitt 1989: Steven McEwan 1990: Gordon Lord 1991: Tom Moody 1993: Chris Tolley 1994: Gavin Haynes 1994: David Leatherdale 1995: Phil Weston 1997: Alamgir Sheriyar 1997: Reuben Spiring 1998: Vikram Solanki 2000: Glenn McGrath 2001: Andy Bichel 2004: Nadeem Malik 2004: Ray Price

== Grounds ==
This section gives details of every venue at which Worcestershire have hosted at least one match at first-class or List A level. Figures show the number of Worcestershire matches only played at the grounds listed, and do not include abandoned games. Note that the locations given are current; in some cases grounds now in other counties lie within the traditional boundaries of Worcestershire.

Haden Hill Park in Old Hill, West Midlands, was due to host a Benson & Hedges Cup match in 1988. However, this was abandoned without a ball being bowled and no other senior cricket has been played at the ground, so it is not included in the table.

Name of ground	Location	First-class span	Worcs f-c matches	List A span	Worcs LA matches
Bournville Cricket Ground	Bournville, Birmingham	1910–1911	2	N/A	0
Chain Wire Club Ground	Stourport-on-Severn, Worcestershire	1980	1	N/A	0
Chester Road North Ground	Kidderminster, Worcestershire	1921–2024	70	1969–2008	5
Evesham Cricket Club Ground	Evesham, Worcestershire	1951	1	N/A	0
Blackfinch New Road	Worcester	1899–present	1,072	1963–present	425
Racecourse Ground	Hereford	1919–1983	5	1983–1987	3
Seth Somers Park	Halesowen, West Midlands	1964–1969	2	N/A	0
Tipton Road	Dudley, West Midlands	1911–1971	88	1969–1977	14
War Memorial Athletic Ground	Stourbridge, West Midlands	1905–1981	61	1969–1982	3
Himley Cricket Club	Himley, Staffordshire	N/A	0	2007	1
Worcester Royal Grammar School Ground (Flagge Meadow)	Worcester	N/A	0	2007	1

== Records ==
=== First-class ===
Most first-class runs for Worcestershire
Qualification – 20,000 runs

Player	Runs
Don Kenyon	34,490
Graeme Hick	31,149
Glenn Turner	22,298
Alan Ormrod	21,753
Harold Gibbons	20,918
Frederick Bowley	20,750
Ron Headley	20,712
Tim Curtis	20,155

Most first-class wickets for Worcestershire
Qualification – 1,000 wickets

Player	Wickets
Reg Perks	2,143
Norman Gifford	1,615
Jack Flavell	1,507
Fred Root	1,387
Dick Howorth	1,274
Roly Jenkins	1,148
Peter Jackson	1,139
Len Coldwell	1,029

==== Batting ====
- Highest team total: 701/6 declared v. Surrey, Worcester, 2007
- Lowest team total: 24 v. Yorkshire, Huddersfield, 1903
- Highest individual innings: 405* by Graeme Hick v. Somerset, Taunton, 1988
- Most runs in a season: 2,654 by Harold Gibbons, 1934

==== Bowling ====
- Best bowling in an innings: 9–23 by Fred Root v. Lancashire, Worcester, 1931
- Best bowling in a match: 15–87 by Arthur Conway v. Gloucestershire, Moreton-in-Marsh, 1914
- Most wickets in a season: 207 by Fred Root, 1925

==== Highest partnership for each wicket ====
- 1st: 309 by Frederick Bowley and Harry Foster v. Derbyshire, Derby, 1901
- 2nd: 316 by Stephen Moore and Vikram Solanki v. Gloucestershire, Cheltenham, 2008
- 3rd: 438* by Graeme Hick and Tom Moody v. Hampshire, Southampton, 1997
- 4th: 330 by Ben Smith and Graeme Hick v. Somerset, Taunton, 2006
- 5th: 393 by Ted Arnold and William Burns v. Warwickshire, Birmingham, 1909
- 6th: 265 by Graeme Hick and Steve Rhodes v. Somerset, Taunton, 1988
- 7th: 256 by David Leatherdale and Steve Rhodes v. Nottinghamshire, Nottingham, 2002
- 8th: 225* by Jason Holder and Matthew Waite v. Kent, Canterbury, 2024
- 9th: 181 by John Cuffe and Robert Burrows v. Gloucestershire, Worcester, 1907
- 10th: 136 by Alex Milton and Steve Magoffin v. Somerset, Worcester, 2018

=== List A ===
- Highest team total: 404/3 (60 overs) v. Devon, Worcester, 1987
- Lowest team total: 58 all out (20.3 overs) v. Ireland, Worcester, 2009
- Highest individual innings: 192 by Callum Ferguson v. Leicestershire, New Road, 2018
- Best bowling: 7–19 by Neal Radford v. Bedfordshire, Bedford, 1991

== Fostershire ==
'Fostershire' was a name jocularly applied to Worcestershire County Cricket Club in the early part of the 20th century, shortly after the county had achieved first-class status and admission into the English County Championship (in 1899). The name came from the fact that seven brothers from this one family played for Worcestershire during the period 1899–1934, three of whom captained the club at some point. Six of the brothers appeared during the seasons 1908–11.
