= 360 bus =

360 bus may refer to:

- London Buses route 360
- West Midlands bus route 360
