= President Kennedy School =

President Kennedy School Academy

Location
- Rookery Lane; Coventry, West Midlands, CV6 4GL; England; 52.4503°N 1.5210°W

Information
- Type: Academy
- Motto: Building Brighter Futures
- Established: 1967
- Department for Education URN: 140248 Tables
- Ofsted: Reports
- Head teacher: Tyson Lane
- Staff: 85
- Gender: Coeducational
- Age: 11 to 18
- Enrolment: 1605
- Colours: navy blue and gold
- Website: http://www.pks.coventry.sch.uk/

President Kennedy School is a coeducational secondary school and sixth form with academy status, located in the Keresley area of Coventry, England. The predecessor school President Kennedy School and Community College was judged outstanding by Ofsted in December 2023.

== History ==
The school was founded in 1966 with Dr J. M. Frost the first headmaster. It was originally to be called either Rookery Farm School or Holbrook High, but the assassination of U.S. President John F. Kennedy during the approval stage resulted in the school being named after Kennedy. The school marked the 50th anniversary of Kennedy's assassination with a series of special assemblies and debates led by its History Department. The school is located in the north-west of Coventry and includes the Holbrooks and Whitmore Park areas of the city.
