= Commonwealth XI cricket team in India in 1964–65 =

A Commonwealth XI cricket team visited India in November to December 1964 and played one first-class match over four days against the Bengal Chief Minister's XI at Eden Gardens in Calcutta, winning by one wicket after chasing 424 in the fourth innings. The tour was organised by Alf Gover to celebrate the 75th year of the Mohun Bagan AC.

Captained by Peter Richardson, the Commonwealth team consisted of 12 players and was strong, as it featured the great Gary Sobers and such well-known players as Brian Close, Lance Gibbs, Mushtaq Mohammed, Basil Butcher, Keith Andrew, Colin Cowdrey, Barry Knight, Len Coldwell, Cammie Smith and John Mortimore. Coldwell did not play in the first-class match.

The Bengal Chief Minister's XI was virtually an Indian Test side, and included Mansur Ali Khan Pataudi, Hanumant Singh, Chandu Borde and Bhagwat Chandrasekhar.

The Commonwealth team also played a 12-a-side three-day match at Eden Gardens against the President's XII. This match was not first-class.

== Sources ==
- Wisden Cricketers' Almanack, 1966 edition, pages 851–852.
