= Harold Gibbons =

Harold Gibbons may refer to:

- Harold Gibbons (cricketer), English cricketer
- Harold J. Gibbons, American labor leader
