= Coventry Building Society Arena =

Sports stadium in West Midlands, England

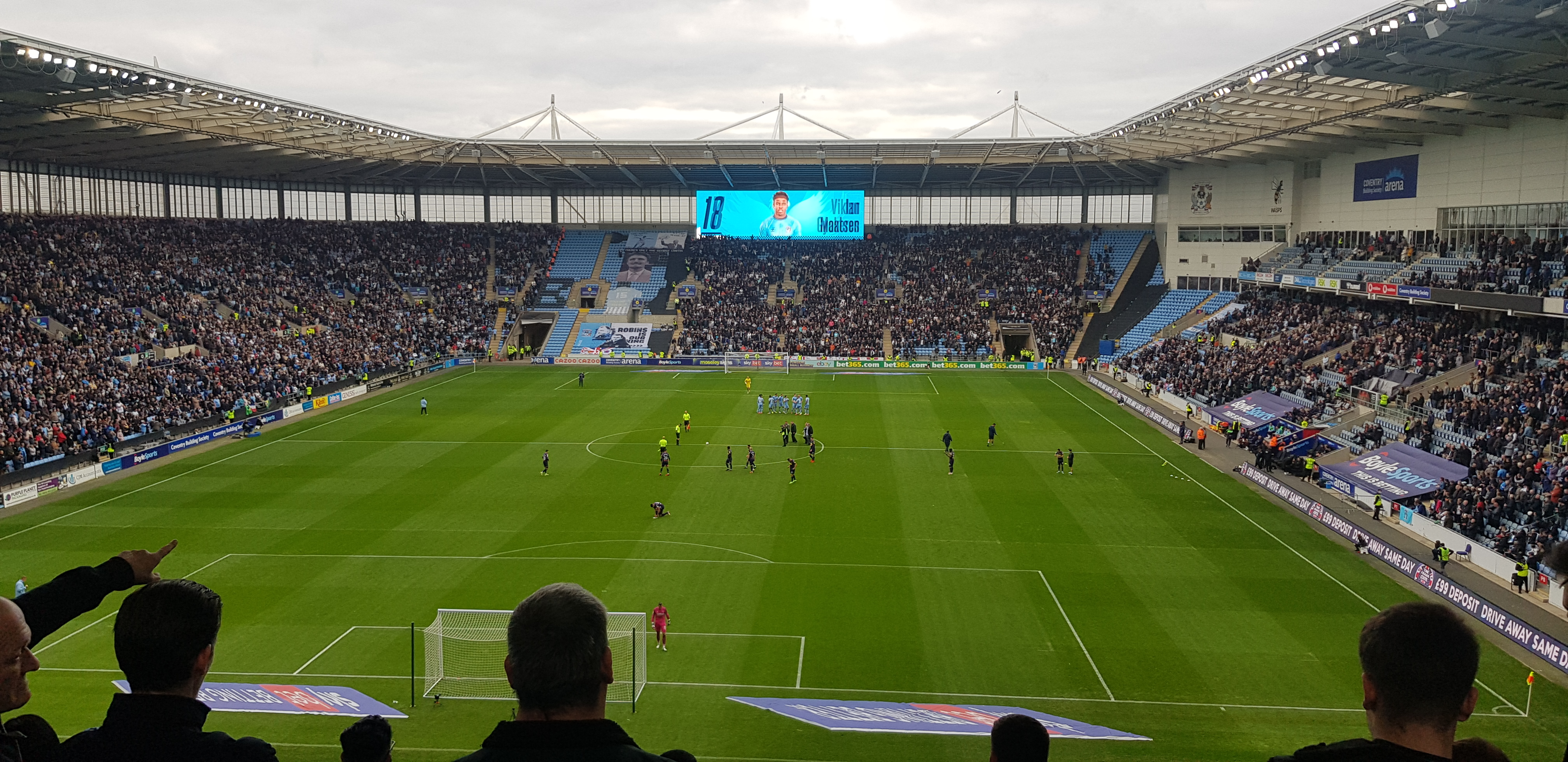
- UEFA
- Interactive map of Coventry Building Society Arena
- Former names: Ricoh Arena (2005–2021); City of Coventry Stadium (2012 Summer Olympics); Coventry Stadium (2022 Commonwealth Games)
- Location: Jimmy Hill Way, Rowleys Green, Coventry, England, CV6 6GE
- Coordinates: 52°26′53″N 1°29′44″W
- Owner: Coventry City Football Club
- Operator: ACL (Arena Coventry Ltd.)
- Capacity: 40,000 (concerts); 32,609 (football and rugby matches) (Subject to segregation regime)
- Surface: XtraGrass (Hybrid grass)
- Scoreboard: Yes
- Record attendance: 32,128 (England V Italy, Arnold Clark Cup, 19 February 2023)
- Field size: 120 m x 68 m
- Public transit: Coventry Arena

Construction
- Built: 2005
- Opened: 2005
- Expanded: 2010
- Cost: £113 million
- Architect: The Miller Partnership

Tenants
- Coventry City (2005–2013, 2014–2019, 2021–); Coventry City Ladies (2014); Wasps (2014–2022); Wasps Netball (2017–2022)

Website
- www.coventrybuildingsocietyarena.co.uk

The Coventry Building Society Arena (often shortened to the CBS Arena or just simply Coventry Arena, and formerly known as the Ricoh Arena) is a complex in Coventry, West Midlands, England. It includes a 32,609-seater stadium which is currently home to Premier League club Coventry City, along with facilities which include a 6,000 square metre (64,600 sq ft) exhibition hall, a hotel and a casino. The site is also home to Arena Park Shopping Centre, containing one of UK's largest Tesco Extra shopping centres. Built on the site of the Foleshill gasworks, it is named after its sponsor, Coventry Building Society who entered into a ten-year sponsorship deal in 2021. For the 2012 Summer Olympics and 2022 Commonwealth Games, where stadium naming sponsorship was forbidden, the stadium was respectively known as the City of Coventry Stadium and Coventry Stadium.

Originally built as a replacement for Coventry City's Highfield Road ground, the stadium was initially owned and operated by Arena Coventry Limited (ACL), with Coventry City as tenants. ACL was owned jointly by Coventry City Council and the Alan Edward Higgs Charity.

Following a protracted rent dispute between Coventry City and ACL, the football club left the arena in 2013; playing home matches in Northampton for over a year before returning in September 2014. Within two months, both shareholders in ACL were bought out by rugby union Premiership Rugby club Wasps, who relocated to the stadium from their previous ground, Adams Park in High Wycombe. A further dispute with Wasps prior to the 2019–20 season saw Coventry City leave the Ricoh for a further two seasons. In March 2021, Wasps and Coventry City agreed to a ten-year deal to return to the arena and the city of Coventry. The deal became null and void with Mike Ashley's Frasers Group's purchase of the arena. In April 2023, it was announced Coventry City and Frasers Group had agreed a five-year deal for Coventry City to play at the Arena, and on 23 August 2025, Coventry City announced they had become the landlords of the Arena following the completion of an acquisition deal from Frasers Group.

The stadium was the first cashless stadium in the United Kingdom, with customers using a prepay smartcard system in the ground's bars and shops. Following this, the stadium concourse and bars have remained cashless.

== History ==
=== Planning a new stadium ===
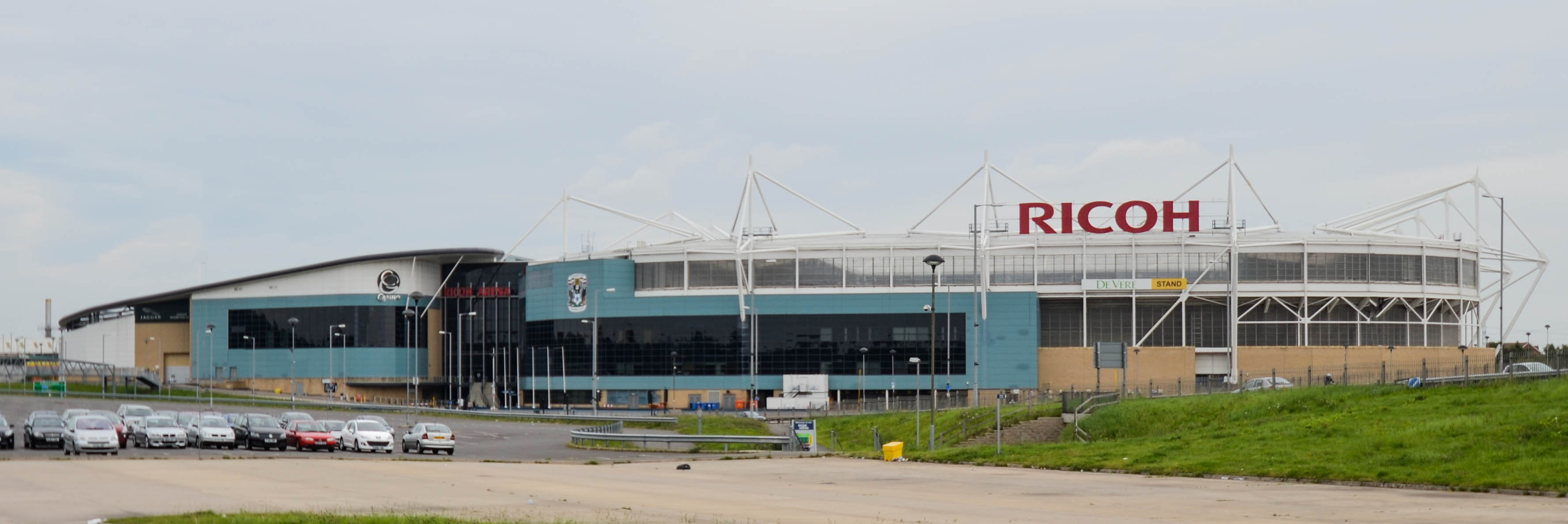
The Coventry Building Society Arena

The decision to move Coventry City from Highfield Road to a new stadium – with a larger capacity and better road links and parking facilities – was made in 1997 by the club's then-chairman Bryan Richardson. It was anticipated that the new stadium would be ready for the 2000–01 season. Permission for the construction of a 45,000-seater stadium was given in the spring of 1999, with a targeted completion date of August 2001. However, the stadium was delivered four years behind schedule, and was more basic than anticipated in the original plans.

Coventry were one out of three cities to bid for England's new national stadium along with London and Birmingham. In 2001, Nick Nolan, the leader of Coventry City Council, claimed that their proposal was always the strongest as the construction could be completed within three years. The council's plan was to build a 90,000 all-seater stadium for an estimated cost of £250 million. However, it was decided that Wembley, London would remain the location for the national stadium.

The original design for the arena was for a state-of-the-art stadium with a retractable roof and a pitch that could slide out to reveal a hard floor for concerts. After Coventry City's relegation from the Premiership in May 2001, a number of contractor/financier withdrawals, and England's bid to host the 2006 FIFA World Cup ending in failure, the plans were significantly downsized. By the summer of 2002 plans were set for a more basic 32,500-seat stadium.

=== Naming of the stadium ===
The arena's first name, 'The Ricoh Arena' came from a multi-year sponsorship deal, reported to be worth £10 million with camera and photocopier manufacturer Ricoh. During construction the stadium was variously referred to as the Jaguar Arena, Arena Coventry and Arena 2000.

The sponsorship deal with Ricoh came about after the stadium's initial sponsor, luxury car manufacturer Jaguar, was forced to pull out because of the commercial difficulties that had caused the controversial closure of the large Jaguar assembly plant at the city's Brown's Lane, previously a major source of employment in Coventry. On 4 August 2004, 12 months before the stadium's opening, it had been announced that the new stadium would be called the Jaguar Arena in a deal worth up to £7 million until 2015. However, the deal was cancelled on 17 December 2004. Jaguar did however retain naming rights to the Arena's Exhibition Hall. Ricoh's sponsorship of the new stadium was confirmed on 26 April 2005.

On 5 May 2021, it was announced that the venue would be renamed the Coventry Building Society Arena. The name change came into effect in summer 2021 as a part of a ten-year naming rights deal with the UK's second largest building society.

=== Fall into administration and ownership changes ===
On 17 October 2022, it was confirmed that Wasps Holdings, the holding company for Wasps and Wasps Netball had entered administration. They ceased trading immediately and all playing and coaching staff were made redundant. Although the stadium operator Arena Coventry Ltd. were not included in the administration, they filed a notice of intention to appoint an administrator. On 2 November 2022, it was confirmed that stadium operator Arena Coventry Limited had also applied to enter administration. Initially all scheduled events would take place as scheduled. The administration hearing took place on 17 November where it was confirmed that the arena would enter administration but also immediately fall into the ownership of Frasers Group (owned by Mike Ashley), who had a pre-signed deal to immediately take over the stadium should it fall into administration.

On 23 August 2025, Coventry City Football Club officially announced the completion of its acquisition of the Arena from the Frasers Group, thereby becoming landlords of their home stadium 20 years to date of their inaugural competitive football match played here.

== Football at the arena ==
=== Coventry City ===
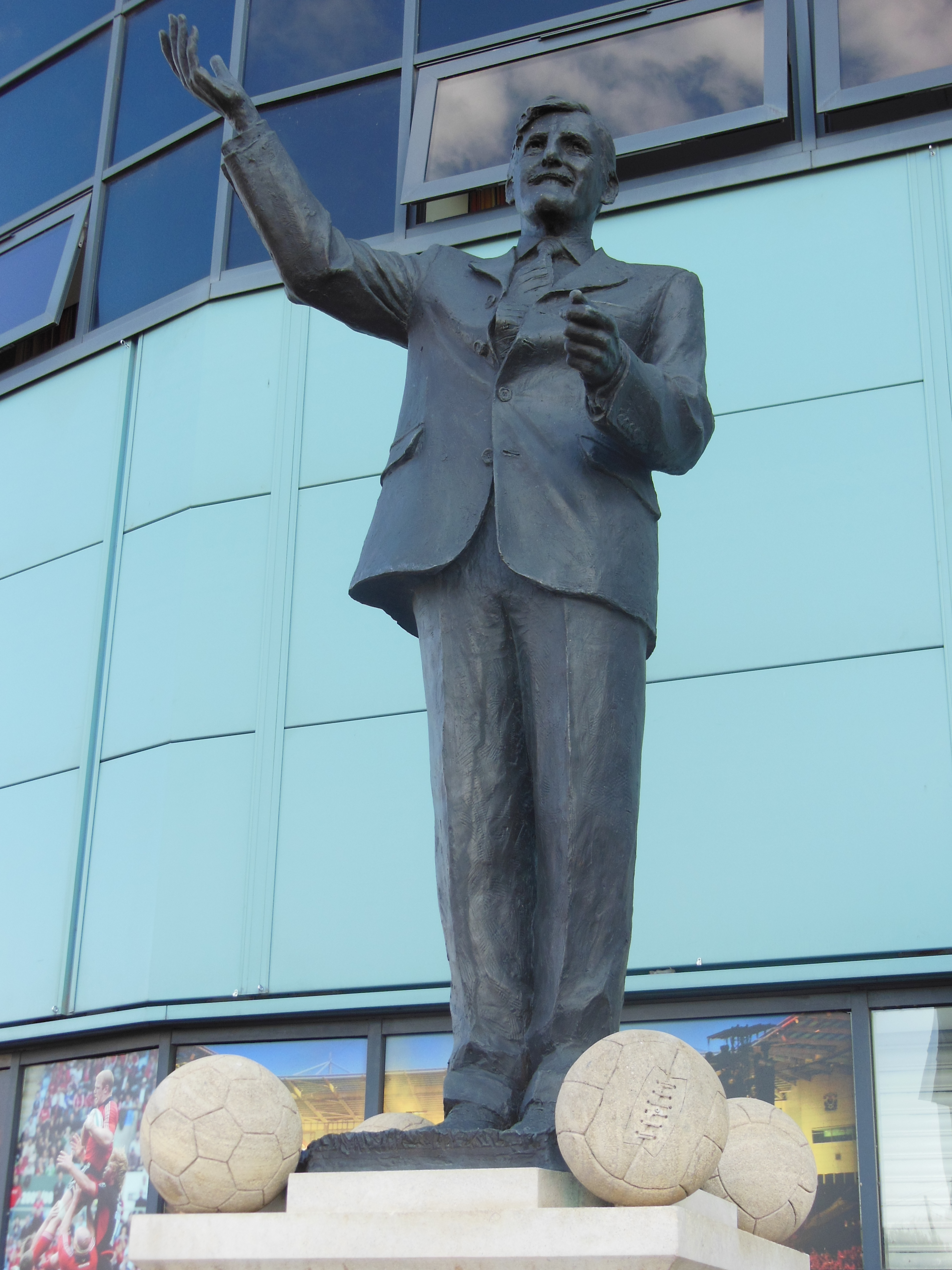
Jimmy Hill (1928–2015) Statue just outside the entrance to the West Stand

The stadium hosted its first football match in August 2005. The official opening was performed by Dame Kelly Holmes and sports minister Richard Caborn on 24 February 2007, by which time the arena had already hosted a sell-out England U21 football match against Germany as well as a full season of Coventry City matches.

The arena became the venue for Coventry City's home games at the start of the 2005–06 season, following 106 years at the Highfield Road stadium. The first competitive football match played at the stadium was against Queens Park Rangers on 20 August 2005, in front of a reduced (for safety reasons) 23,012 capacity crowd. The game ended 3–0 to Coventry, with Claus Bech Jørgensen becoming the first player to score at the arena. Hull City became the first away team to win at the Ricoh, easing their way to a 2–0 win on 24 September 2005, with both goals coming from John Welsh.

The stadium has never seen a capacity 32,600 crowd for a Coventry City match, but 2025 saw their highest attendance to date, coming against Middlesbrough in a Championship match that saw 31,452 people in attendance. Coventry City won the match 2–0.

In December 2009, the first hat-trick was scored at the venue when Freddy Eastwood scored three past Peterborough United. Eastwood grabbed two goals before half-time before Craig Mackail-Smith netted a brace in the second half to level the scoring. However, Coventry City secured three points in the Championship fixture after Eastwood grabbed the final goal of the fixture just a minute after Peterborough levelled. Freddy Eastwood remained the only player to have scored a hat-trick at the Ricoh Arena until Coventry City loanee Jacob Murphy scored a first-half hat-trick in a League One fixture against Gillingham on 21 November 2015.

On 28 July 2011, a bronze statue of Jimmy Hill was unveiled at the entrance to the stadium after £100,000 was raised by Coventry City fans. He managed the club from 1961 to 1967 and was responsible for guiding it to the top flight. Despite this, Hill decided to resign as manager for a career in television but later returned to the Sky Blues as managing director before becoming chairman. When he died in December 2015, fans paid tribute by placing flowers and scarves by and around the statue.

The quickest ever goal scored at the ground was when Coventry striker Dan Agyei converted against Northampton Town after 19.5 seconds on 4 October 2016. This beat the previous record scored by Reading's Grzegorz Rasiak after 27 seconds in 2009, when Reading defeated Coventry 3–1. Rasiak's goal still remains the fastest one scored by an away side at the stadium.

==== Rent dispute (2012–2013) ====
In December 2012, Coventry City owners SISU Capital became embroiled in a high-profile dispute with ACL over the rent arrangement and a lack of access to matchday revenue. The previously agreed rent amounted to £1.2 million per year, but did not give Coventry City access to matchday revenue.

A deadline of 27 December 2012 was given by ACL for unpaid rent. After the deadline passed, a winding up order was enforced through the High Court. Subsequently, after ACL planned to place Coventry City FC Ltd into administration, the club itself entered administration, accepting a ten-point penalty from the Football League as a consequence. A further 10-point penalty was incurred when ACL refused to accept the terms of a company voluntary arrangement (CVA) proposed by the administrator. Coventry City has since been bought by Otium Entertainment Group.

On 23 March 2013, Coventry City moved all its staff and club shop stock from the venue after a long dispute over rent and access to matchday revenue with the club.

Coventry City agreed to play their home games at Northampton Town's Sixfields Stadium to ensure that they fulfilled their fixtures. This resulted in ACL threatening to sue Northampton Town if they decided to carry on hosting Coventry City's home games. Northampton Town released a statement saying that they "will not be bullied or threatened". ACL subsequently withdrew its legal action against Northampton Town.

==== Second stint at the arena (2014–2019) ====
ACL and SISU agreed a two-year deal to bring Coventry City back to the arena in 2014. The club also had the option to play there for a further two years; they played their first match back at the stadium on 5 September 2014 against Gillingham. This followed a payment of £470,000 from SISU Capital to ACL after a Football League ruling. The deal was later extended by a year. This meant Coventry City remained at the Ricoh Arena until May 2019 before ground-sharing for two seasons with Birmingham City at St Andrew's.

==== Third stint at the arena (2021–present) ====
On 10 March 2021, It was announced that Coventry City and Wasps had agreed to a ten-year deal, which would mean that the club would return to the stadium from the 2021–22 season. The club still intend to build a new stadium on land near the University of Warwick on the southern edge of the city, as a break clause in their contract will allow them to leave the Ricoh for their new stadium. Their first game back was a pre-season friendly on 1 August against Wolverhampton Wanderers in which Coventry lost 2–1.

With the administration of Wasps and subsequent transfer of ownership of the Coventry Building Society Arena Coventry City's deal became null and void and the club did not sign to continue the deal with Frasers Group. Frasers Group issued the football club with a notice of eviction on 5 December should they choose to not sign a new deal running until May 2023. Coventry City signed the deal on 13 December agreeing to stay at the arena until at least May 2023. On 28 April 2023, it was announced that Coventry City and Frasers Group had agreed a five-year license for the club to continue to play at the Arena. It was also agreed that as part of the deal, no other sports team were to play home games at the Arena, after issues with the condition of the pitch under previous owners rugby union club Wasps.

=== International football ===
The venue hosted three England under-21 internationals. The first was a 2007 European U-21 Championship qualification play-off match against Germany on 5 October 2006. The hosts edged out the visitors 1–0 thanks to Leighton Baines' 77th-minute goal. The second was a 2011 UEFA European Under-21 Championship qualification Group 9 match against Macedonia on 9 October 2009. The hosts beat the visitors 6–3, with goals from Kieran Gibbs, Micah Richards, and two apiece from Andy Carroll and Zavon Hines. The most recent being a 3–0 win for England U21 in 2015 against Kazakhstan U21.

On 17 May 2007, England U-19 team played their home fixture against Netherlands U-19 team in the Elite qualifying group round. Netherlands won the game 2–1.

=== 2012 Olympics ===
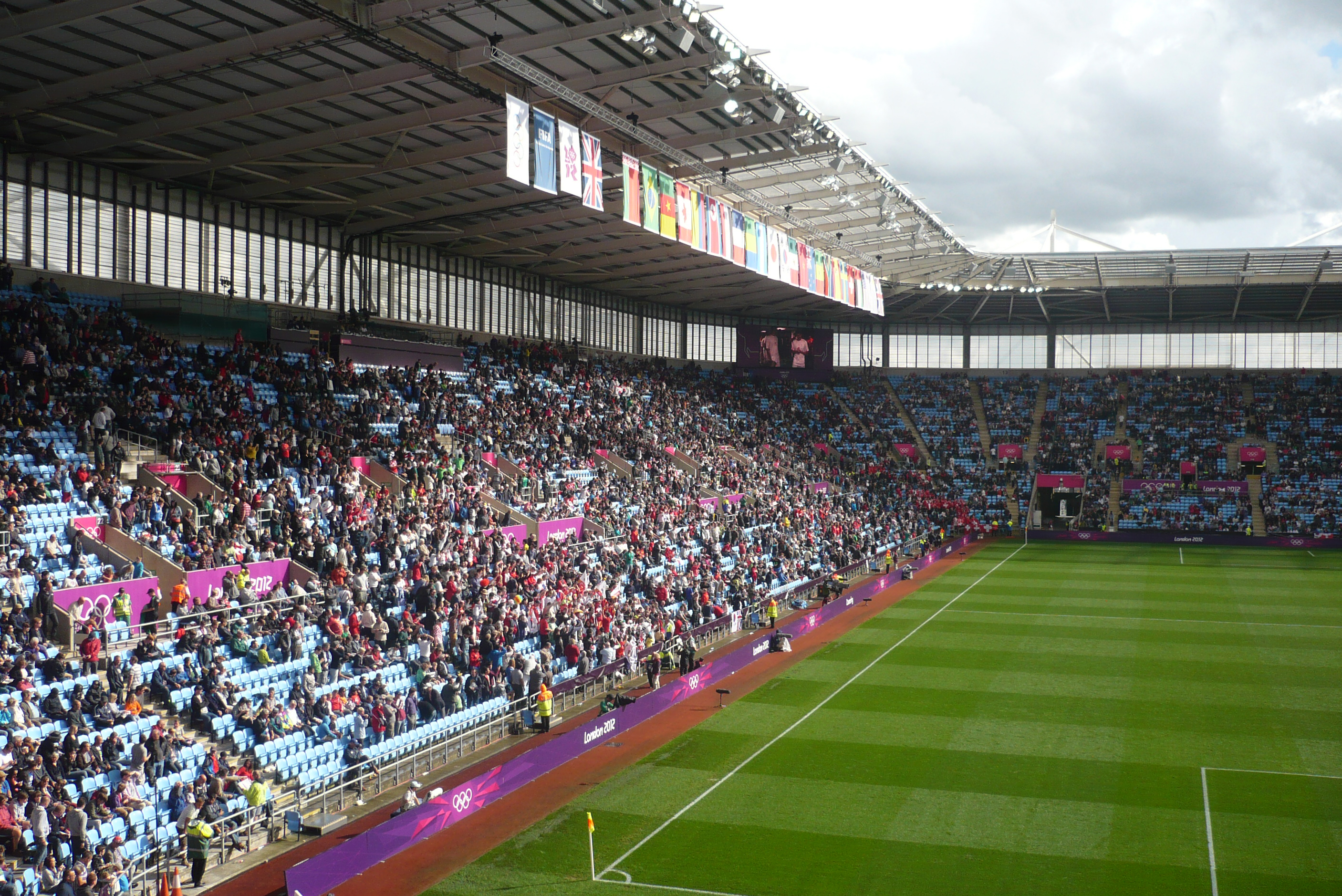
The 2012 Olympic Football competition at the Coventry Building Society Arena

The venue also became host to 2012 Olympic Football matches, where the stadium hosted 12 tournament matches. The stadium was temporarily renamed to City of Coventry Stadium due to sponsorships on venue names not being allowed by the International Olympic Committee. In preparation for the Olympics, a test event on 23 April 2012 saw Oman play Senegal in the Olympic Qualifier play-offs. Senegal won 2–0 and took the final place in the men's 2012 Olympic draw. The first Olympic match, on 25 July 2012, was between Japan and Canada in Group F of the women's tournament. On 9 August 2012, the bronze medal game was held between France and Canada at City of Coventry Stadium. Canada won the bronze medal in a 1–0 stoppage time victory on a goal from Diana Matheson.

=== Other football events ===
The stadium has also hosted the 2011 Women's FA Cup final, which was played between Arsenal and Bristol Academy. 13,885 watched Arsenal win their eleventh FA Cup as they ran out as 2–0 winners.

During Coventry City's absence, Football Conference Youth Alliance Midland Division side Football CV Reds agreed to play eight games at the stadium in January 2014. Leicester City's under-21 development squad played twice at the Arena on 29 January 2014 and 3 February 2014 due to waterlogged pitches at the original venues. The first game was behind closed doors but the second game against Manchester United was open to the public.

In August 2014 it was announced that Coventry City Ladies would be moving to the stadium for the 2014–15 season. However the team had to return to the Oval in Bedworth during the season after Wasps' purchase of the arena.

== Rugby Union at the arena ==
=== Before Wasps' relocation ===
On 22 April 2007, the arena hosted its first ever rugby union match when Northampton Saints hosted Wasps (then known as London Wasps in an all-English Heineken Cup semi-final. 16,186 fans saw Saints captain Bruce Reihana score the first ever try at the stadium but the London Wasps came from behind to win 13–30 to secure a place in the final.

London Wasps again played at the arena, this time hosting Irish side Munster on 10 November 2007 in a Heineken Cup fixture. Wasps narrowly won 24–23. The stadium hosted another Heineken Cup semi-final in the same season when Saracens chose it as their venue to play Munster. It was a close encounter that saw Munster win by two points with a score of 16–18.

On 28 March 2009, the arena hosted the EDF Energy Cup semi-finals. The first semi-final saw Gloucester beat their Welsh opponents Ospreys with a score of 17–0. A total of 26,744 people turned up with them also witnessing Cardiff Blues beat Northampton Saints 11–5.

The arena was one of several venues that put in a bid to host Rugby World Cup matches in 2015 as England were announced as hosts on 28 July 2009. However, the venue was unsuccessful in their bid with Villa Park and the Leicester City Stadium becoming the chosen venues within the Midlands to host tournament matches.

=== Wasps ===
In September 2014, Simon Gilbert of the Coventry Telegraph broke the news that Wasps (formerly London Wasps) were in talks to permanently relocate to the arena, from their home at Adams Park, in High Wycombe. In October 2014 Wasps announced that from December 2014 they would play their home games at the Coventry Building Society Arena. On 14 November 2014 Wasps confirmed the purchase of the final 50% of shares in the stadium from the Alan Edward Higgs Charity to become outright owners of the facility.

After Wasps purchased the remaining 50% from the Alan Edward Higgs Charity in November 2014, the club announced that the north stand would be renamed "The Higgs Charity Stand", and added that 50 pence would be donated to the charity from each ticket sold in that stand.

Wasps played their first home match as owners at the stadium against London Irish on 21 December 2014. The match saw Coventry-born Andy Goode set a Premiership Rugby record with the most points scored in a single match with a total of 33. It was not the only record broken at the time as the attendance of 28,254 meant it was the largest attendance at a Rugby Premiership match at a recognised home ground.

The Rugby Premiership attendance record was broken again when Leicester Tigers came to the arena. The overall attendance was 32,019, meaning it was the highest attendance at the stadium for a sporting event as well as the largest attendance at a Rugby Premiership match at a recognised home ground. Leicester Tigers beat Wasps by a score of 21–26 on their first trip to the stadium.

Samoa became the first international side to play at the stadium in a Rugby World Cup warm-up match when they faced Wasps on 5 September 2015.

Wasps recorded their biggest ever win in the Champions Cup on 15 October 2016 when they defeated Italian side Zebre 82–14 after scoring twelve tries.

On 28 November 2022, all external Wasps signage was removed from the stadium, confirming the end of their association with the stadium. Internal signage has also since been removed.

== Other sporting events at the arena ==
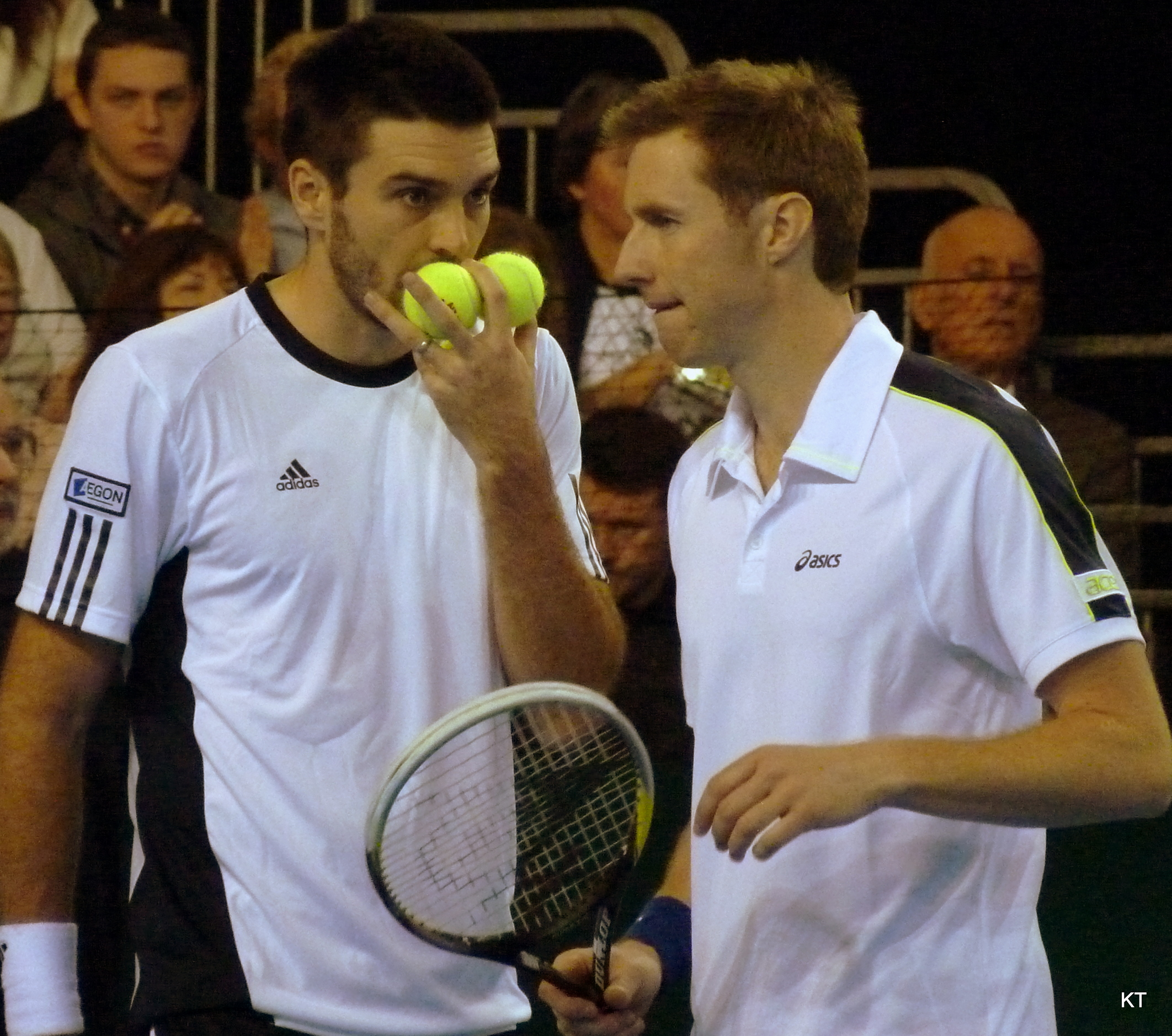
The Davis Cup at The Coventry Building Society Arena

The arena was selected to host the Great Britain versus Russia Group One second-round tie of the 2013 Davis Cup tennis competition on 5–7 April. Great Britain earned a shock 3–2 victory over Russia after they were trailing 2–0 in the tie. On Friday 5 April, Russia's Dmitry Tursunov beat Great Britain's Dan Evans and Evgeny Donskoy defeated James Ward, which put Russia 2–0 ahead. On the Saturday, Great Britain's Colin Fleming and Jonny Marray won the doubles match against Igor Kunitsyn and Victor Baluda. On Sunday, Great Britain completed the comeback when Ward got the win against Tursunov and Evans beat Donskoy.

After the revival of the Champion of Champions snooker tournament, the arena was chosen as the venue for its first tournament since 1980. After a successful event, The Coventry Building Society Arena became the annual venue for the competition until 2019 after hosting it again in 2014 as well as 2015.

Premier League Darts was held at the venue on two occasions with the first being on 21 February 2008 and the second being on 19 February 2009. Due to the rising demand for tickets in the PDC, it has not been a venue to audiences since. The venue has other minor PDC tournaments and those without audiences during the COVID-19 pandemic, as well as BDO competitions.

The stadium hosted its first-ever American football game on 6 May 2007, when the Coventry Cassidy Jets beat then British national champions London Olympians 27–20. The Jets had hoped to play their inaugural EFAF Cup game against Madrid Bears on 29 April but they were forced to change venue to the Manor Park Stadium in Nuneaton. The Heineken Cup the previous week to the Madrid game had led to CCFC objecting in case of damage to the pitch.

The stadium hosted a rugby league fixture for the first time when the Coventry Bears took on the Keighley Cougars at the stadium on 8 May 2016 in a League 1 encounter.

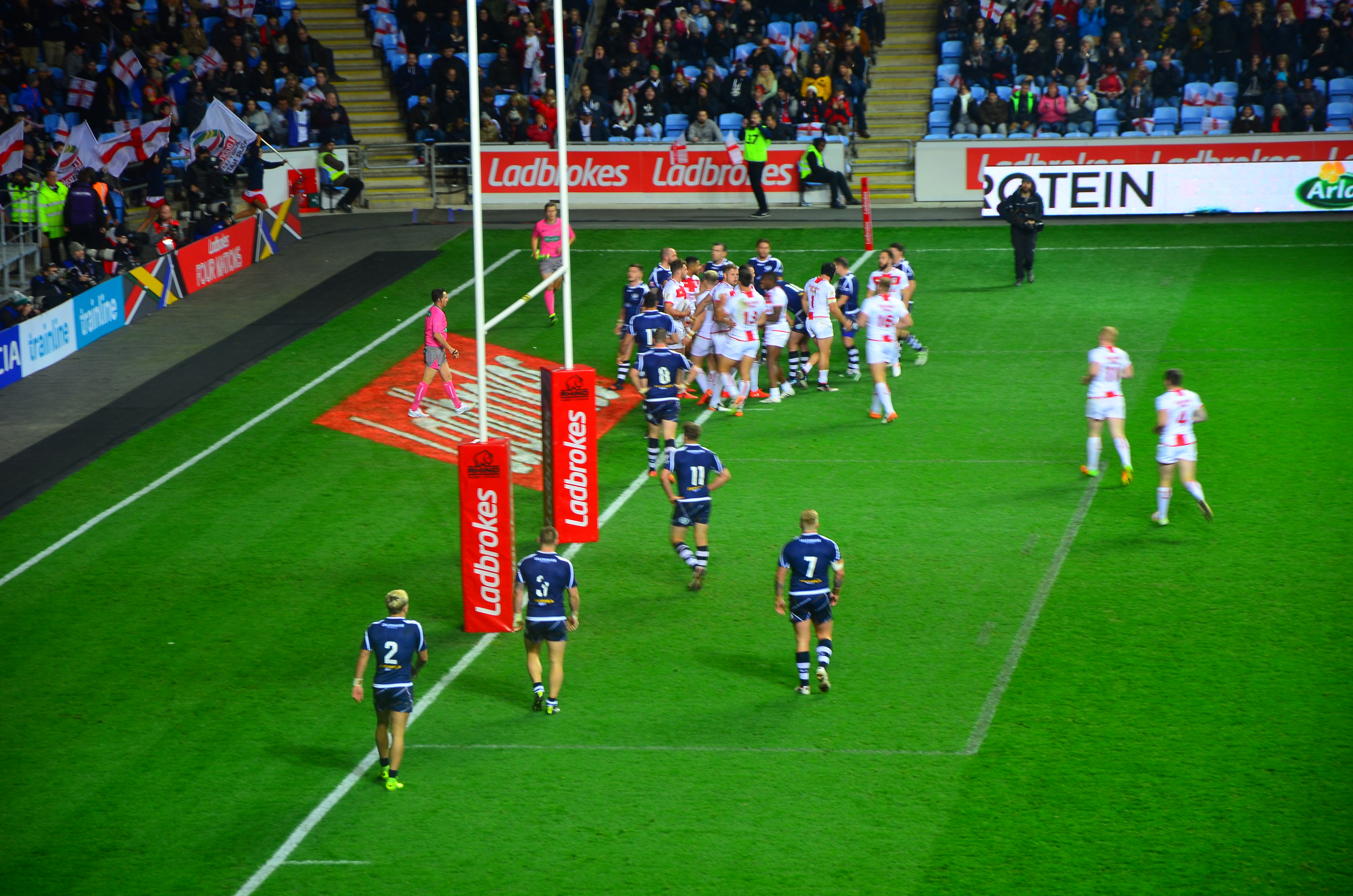
England v Scotland in the Rugby League Four Nations at Coventry in 2016

A record home crowd for the Coventry Bears of 1,097 watched the side lose to the Cougars. The arena also hosted a 2016 Rugby League Four Nations double-header in November as England defeated Scotland and Australia defeated New Zealand at the stadium in front of 21,009 people.

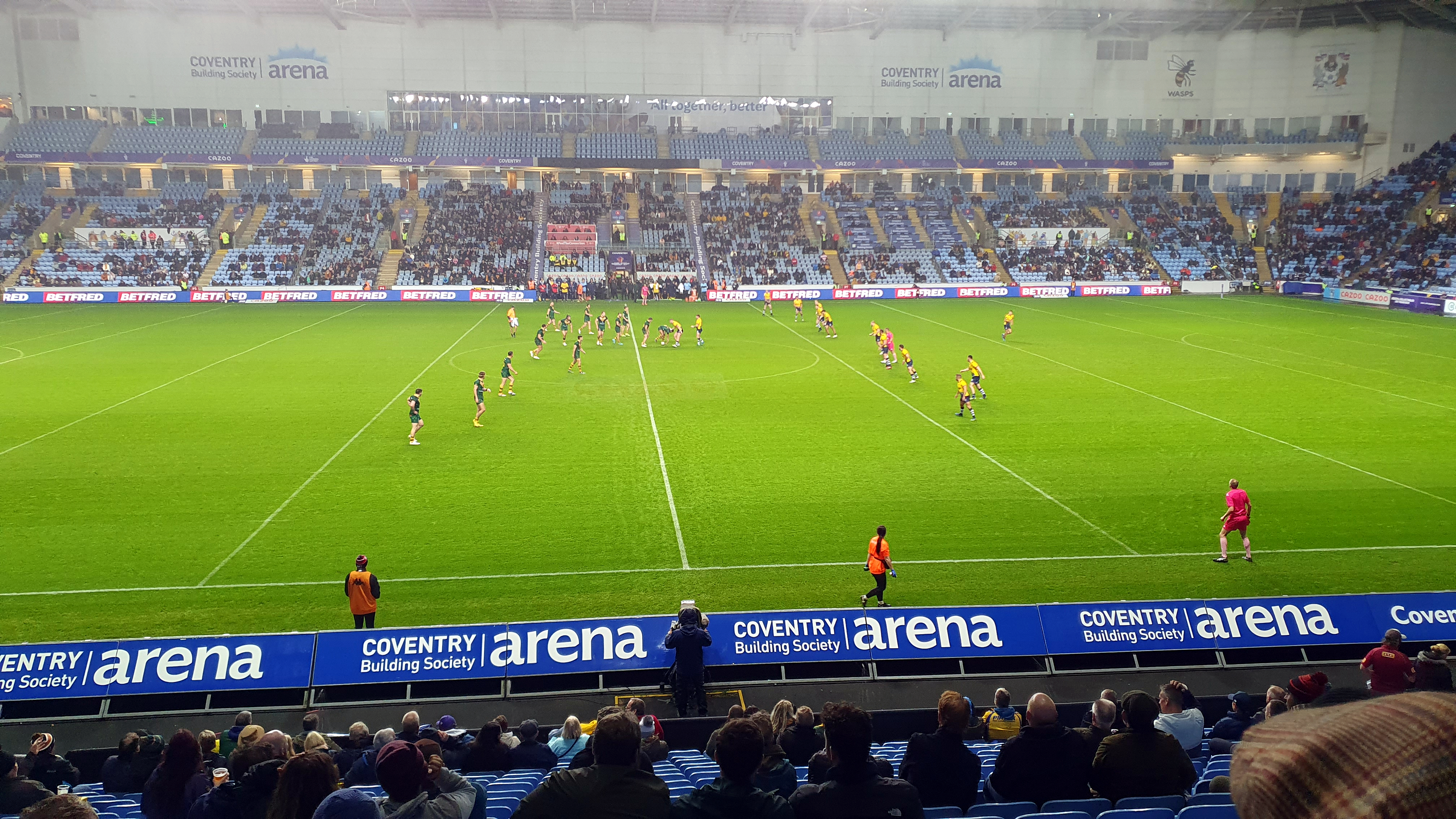
Australia v Scotland in the 2021 Rugby League World Cup at Coventry in 2022

The arena held the rugby sevens, wrestling and judo events at the 2022 Commonwealth Games.

== Other events at the arena ==
- The first concert held at the arena was by Bryan Adams on 23 September 2005. The bar in the Eon Lounge, overlooking the pitch, was named The Bryan Adams Bar after the Canadian rocker.
- Take That performed 3 nights on 8, 9, 10 June 2009 as part of The Circus Live playing to 120,000 people.
- Almost 40,000 people saw Oasis play a concert at the stadium on 7 July 2009.
- Scouting for Girls performed on 30 November 2008, in the Ericsson Exhibition Hall.
- Coldplay performed a sold-out show at the venue on 29 May 2012 as part of their Mylo Xyloto Tour.
- Bruce Springsteen and the E Street Band performed a concert to a sell-out crowd of 37,262 on 20 June 2013 as part of their Wrecking Ball Tour. They performed again on 3 June 2016 as part of their The River 2016 Tour in front of a sold-out crowd of 36,588 people.
- Multiplay's Insomnia Festival was hosted at the Ricoh Stadium from 2014 until 2016 when it moved to the NEC.
- Rihanna performed at the stadium as a part of her Anti World Tour on 25 June 2016.
- MTV Crashes came to the venue on Friday 27 May and Saturday 28 May 2016, which included Chase & Status and Kaiser Chiefs on the first night while the second night was headlined by The Chainsmokers as part of Club MTV.
- On Thursday 17 November 2016, Catfish and the Bottlemen performed to a sellout crowd in the Ericsson Exhibition Hall.
- On Saturday 2 June 2018 the Rolling Stones played the Arena as part of their No Filter Tour, Mick Jagger and the crowd sang Happy Birthday to Charlie Watts, who was celebrating his 77th Birthday.
- The Spice Girls performed for two nights at the arena, including one sold-out concert, on 3 and 4 June 2019 as part of their Spice World – 2019 Tour.
- The Killers performed at the stadium on 28 May 2022 as part of their Imploding the Mirage tour.
- Rammstein performed at the stadium on 26 June 2022.
- Harry Styles performed at the arena on 22 and 23 May 2023 as part of his Love On Tour.
- Arctic Monkeys performed on 31 May 2023.
- Ed Sheeran performed at the arena on 5 December 2025 as part of his Loop Tour.
- Take That returned to the stadium on 4, 5, 6 June 2026 reviving The Circus Live which was previously staged at the venue in 2009.

== Stands ==
=== North Stand ===
When the ground first opened, the stand was known as the Coventry Evening Telegraph stand and was the main stand for Coventry City supporters that sang during games. After the sponsorship deal ran out for the stand, it became known as the North Stand, but was then renamed again after the Wasps' purchase of the Alan Higgs Charity share of Arena Coventry Limited. After attendances dropping due to boycotts against the ownership, Coventry City announced that for the 2014–15 season that the stand would be closed for football matches due to costs but would be opened if the demand is there, however tickets could still be bought there for Wasps' fixtures. Coventry City reopened the North Stand ahead of the 2021–22 season. It currently houses the club's family area and general admission seating.

=== West Stand ===
The only two-tier stand at the stadium, it consists of a larger lower tier below the upper tier, which consists of corporate hospitality boxes. Also situated on this side of the stadium are hotel rooms, which have a view of the pitch. In the corner between this stand and the South Stand is a police control box. This is the only stand that offers cushioned seats and it also provides seating for directors as well as the media. Recent years have seen the addition of a private lounge for premium ticketholders (known as the Vodafone Lounge during Wasps' tenure after their main sponsor, now renamed "The Mill") and new hospitality experiences on the upper balcony.

=== East Stand ===
The East Stand provided a video screen in the corner by the South Stand until 2018. This corner soon became known as the singers' corner to Coventry fans as first called by Aidy Boothroyd, when he was manager of the Sky Blues; ever since, it has been the primary source of atmosphere at the ground. This is where the main cameras are positioned. The stand has been formerly known as the NTL stand and the Tesco Stand. In 2021, in response to Coventry Building Society's sponsorship deal, the black seats which previously spelt Ricoh were rearranged to spell Wasps. Following Wasps' bankruptcy and the purchase of the ground by Mike Ashley, the Wasps seats were removed and replaced with seats that spelt Frasers. Safe standing was installed in the top of Singers' Corner ahead of the 2024–25 season, and after the football club purchased the ground outright in 2025, the Frasers seats were reconfigured to now read Sky Blues.

=== South Stand ===
This stand is used for away supporters for Coventry City football matches and only opened for rugby matches when needed due to extra demand. Clubs such as Sheffield Wednesday, Chelsea, West Ham United, Leicester City, Wolves, Sunderland and Leeds United have sold out the stand in the past. In cases of insufficient travelling demand it has also been opened for the home support during football matches. The stand has had previous names in the past due to naming rights. In October 2018, the capacity of the stand was reduced when a new large screen was installed to replace the previous one situated between the South and East stands. Following City's return to the CBS in 2021–22, most of the stand was given over to away supporters, with large patches of the stand closed for segregation and covered with banners paying tribute to various Sky Blues figures (including Jimmy Hill, George Curtis, and then-manager Mark Robins). Recent work has reduced the away end's proportion to roughly 3,000 seats, directly abutting the west stand. The top portion of the away section is safe standing, as football grounds which install safe standing in their home areas must also install a commensurate amount in the away section.

== Facilities ==
=== Stadium Bowl ===
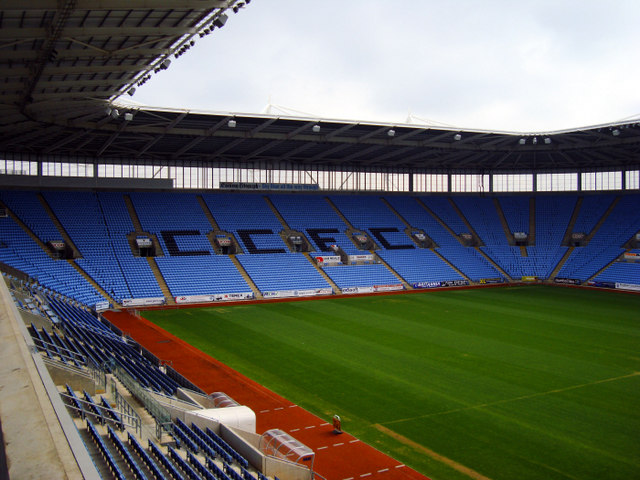
Stadium Bowl used mainly for Coventry City football matches.

The stadium bowl has a seating capacity of 32,609 with the overall capacity rising to 40,000 for concerts and has easy access to refreshments for customers from the many bar and food outlets around the bowl. Access for production is accessible via two main tunnels on the pitch and the stadium bowl also has back of house facilities meeting artist and production standards.

The Stadium bowl is the main venue for its sporting events as it currently hosts Coventry City's home fixtures as well as hosting top sporting events such as 2012 Olympic Football matches and Heineken Cup semi-finals.

It has also hosted music concerts with Muse, Bon Jovi, Red Hot Chili Peppers, Take That, Bruce Springsteen, Oasis, Pink, Rolling Stones, Rihanna, Spice Girls and Kings of Leon all performing on the outdoor pitch. Coldplay also performed there with tickets selling out in ninety minutes.

=== Indoor Arena – Coventry ===
The Indoor Arena – Coventry, formerly the Jaguar Exhibition Hall and Ericsson Exhibition Hall, is 6,000 square metres and column-free. The first ever gig at The Coventry Building Society Arena was held in the Exhibition hall when Bryan Adams played to a sell-out 8,000 crowd. The current maximum capacity is 12,000. Florence and the Machine, Scouting for Girls, The Enemy as well as the Specials (twice) have all performed in the hall.

It is also the host to the Champion of Champions snooker competition annually and was home to Netball Superleague side Wasps Netball between February 2017 and their final season in 2022. The hall has also hosted major events such as the Davis Cup in 2013.

Besides Entertainment and Sport the indoor arena is also used as the counting hall for Council and Parliamentary Elections within Coventry and occasionally Nuneaton/Bedworth.

Since Coventry City became owners of the stadium, the indoor arena has been used before and after games as a fan zone, with the first being for the game against Blackburn Rovers in October 2025.

=== Hotels ===
The site includes a 121 bedroom DoubleTree by Hilton hotel including 50 rooms with pitch-side views of the stadium bowl. All of the rooms are en-suite as well as coming with access to satellite TV and wi-fi. The Singers Bar & Bistro is available for hotel guests to use, which is divided into a restaurant, bar area and coffee lounge.

=== Casino ===
The casino is built under the ground and has a standalone Show Bar, which has had live entertainment such as Rebecca Ferguson performing. There is a 120-seater poker room as well as other casino games on offer such as blackjack, roulette and slots. There is a gaming lounge, which shows the big televised sporting events.

=== Club shops ===
There are club shops situated at the stadium, where it is possible to buy merchandise and match tickets for all teams. Coventry City moved all its staff and stock out of the complex in March 2013. A new combined club shop and ticket office for Coventry City opened ahead of the 2021–22 season, this is the first time Coventry City have had a club shop at the arena since 2013 after relocating the club shop to Gallagher Retail Park and then to the Arena Park Shopping Centre, and the ticket office having been situated at the Butts Park Arena. Coventry opened a second club shop in West Orchards Shopping Centre in July 2022.

=== Sports Bar ===
A 400 square metre sports bar opened at the arena in 2021, located by the front door in the space previously occupied by Wasps' club shop. The bar is named The Anecdote.

=== Arena Shopping Park ===
The Arena Shopping Park is also on the same site of The Coventry Building Society Arena but is not operated by Arena Coventry Limited. It is instead owned by Tesco with a large Tesco Extra store available to customers. Other stores such as Next, New Look, Boots, Marks and Spencer, Currys and Decathlon are also at the shopping park with other smaller unit shops like Game, Clinton Cards and TUI travel agent inside the mall where Tesco Extra is situated.

== Accessibility ==
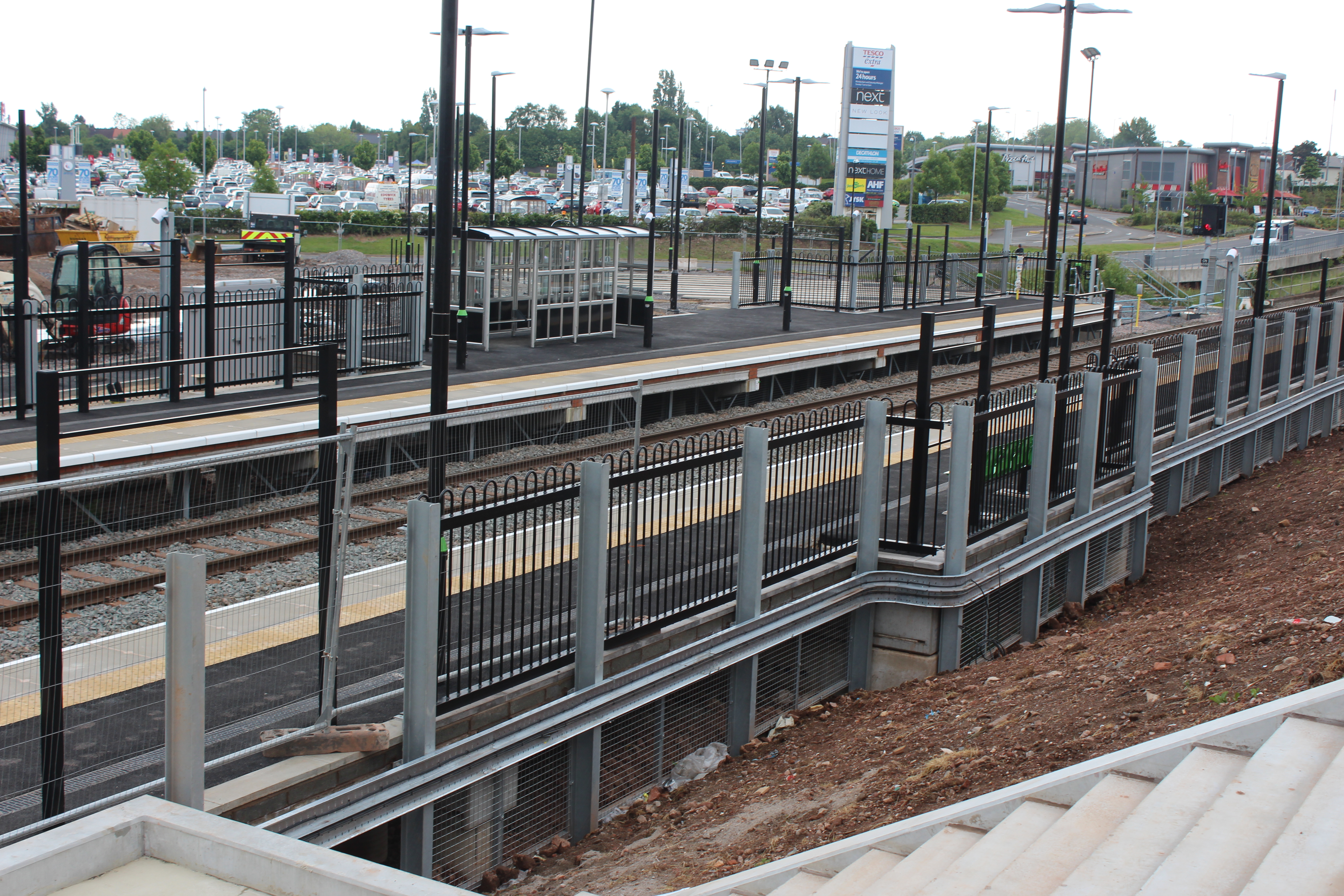
Coventry Arena Station (while under construction)

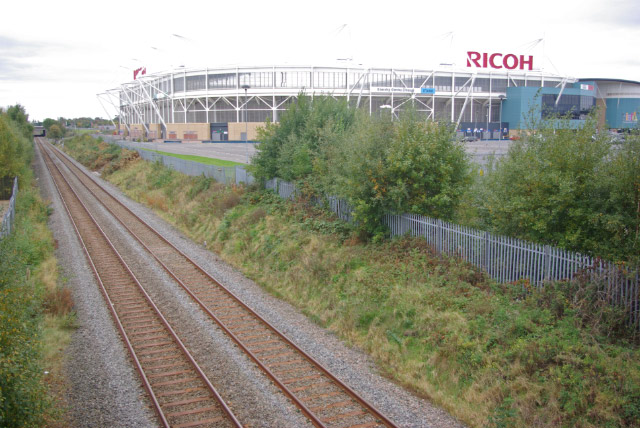
Railway line by the Coventry Building Society Arena

The stadium is situated on the northern side of Coventry, one mile (1.6 km) south of junction 3 of the M6 motorway, on the A444 road from Coventry to Nuneaton. The railway line between Coventry and Nuneaton is immediately adjacent and Coventry Arena railway station which opened on 18 January 2016. It is located in the small suburb of Rowley's Green, between two larger suburbs, namely Holbrooks to the west, and Longford to the east. The stadium was constructed on the former site of the Foleshill gasworks complex (which fell within the former Foleshill civil parish and, until 1932, Foleshill Rural District), although what is today considered the Foleshill district begins around one-half mile (0.8 km) to the south-east. The stadium is located within one-quarter mile (0.4 km) of the boundary with the borough of Nuneaton and Bedworth and the county of Warwickshire. It is adjacent to the Arena Park Shopping Centre.

From the city centre, West Midlands Bus routes 3 & 5 bus go to the Arena Park Shopping Centre. Routes 20, 20A, 20B & 20C, and Stagecoach Midlands Route 48 stop nearby on Foleshill Road. It is also served by Arriva Midlands routes 78 & 78A, and Stagecoach Midlands routes 60 & 703.

When arriving by train to Coventry, the number 8 bus can be caught at the railway station to the Transport Museum. There is a railway station located at the stadium but it was announced in August 2015 that the new station will be closed following major events at the stadium. It was announced that trains will be provided to transport 1,000 extra supporters for the Wasps' fixtures against Harlequins on 28 February and Leicester Tigers on 12 March 2016 as a trial run. London Midland and Wasps will review the trial run before deciding any more decisions with Coventry City "hopeful" that they will eventually benefit from the services.

== Attendance and Records ==
=== Highest attendances ===
==== Top ten sporting attendances ====
The table shows the top ten attendances at the Coventry Building Society Arena for sporting events, in order of attendance.

#	Match	Tournament	Sport	Date	Attendance	Ref
1	England Women 2–1 Italy Women	Arnold Clark Cup	Football	19 February 2023	32,128 Claimed (Double-header)	
2	Wasps 21–26 Leicester Tigers	Premiership Rugby	Rugby Union	9 May 2015	32,019	
3	Coventry City 0-0 Sheffield Wednesday F.C.	EFL Championship	Football	11 April 2026	31,647	
4	Wasps 14–24 Bath	Premiership Rugby	Rugby Union	23 December 2018	31,626	
5	Coventry City 2–1 Stoke City	EFL Championship	Football	28 February 2026	31,516	
6	Coventry City 2–0 Middlesbrough	EFL Championship	Football	3 May 2025	31,452	
7	Coventry City 2–1 Leicester City	EFL Championship	Football	17 January 2026	31,410	
8	Coventry City 0–2 Chelsea	FA Cup	Football	7 March 2009	31,407	
9	Coventry City 3-2 Derby County F.C.	EFL Championship	Football	3 April 2026	31,349	
10	Coventry City F.C. 1-2 Southampton F.C.	EFL Championship	Football	14 March 2026	31,281	

==== Highest attendances by season ====
The table shows the highest attendances of Coventry City and Wasps fixtures each season.

	Coventry City				Wasps Rugby			
Season	Competition	Opposition	Attendance	Ref	Competition	Opposition	Attendance	Ref
2005–06	Championship	Wolverhampton Wanderers	26,851		Wasps played their home games at Adams Park			
2006–07	Championship	West Bromwich Albion	26,343		Wasps played their home games at Adams Park			
2007–08	FA Cup fifth round	West Bromwich Albion	28,163		Wasps played their home games at Adams Park			
2008–09	FA Cup Quarter-Final	Chelsea	31,407		Wasps played their home games at Adams Park			
2009–10	Championship	Leicester City	22,209		Wasps played their home games at Adams Park			
2010–11	Championship	Leeds United	28,184		Wasps played their home games at Adams Park			
2011–12	Championship	Birmingham City	22,240		Wasps played their home games at Adams Park			
2012–13	Johnstone's Paint Trophy Area Final	Crewe Alexandra	31,054		Wasps played their home games at Adams Park			
2013–14	Coventry City played all their home games at Sixfields Stadium				Wasps played their home games at Adams Park			
2014–15	League One	Gillingham	27,306		Premiership Rugby	Leicester Tigers	32,019	
2015–16	League One	Port Vale	17,779		Premiership Rugby	Saracens	24,053	
2016–17	League One	Bristol Rovers	11,946		Premiership Rugby	Saracens	30,115	
2017–18	League Two	Accrington Stanley	28,343		Premiership Rugby	Gloucester	26,296	
2018–19	League One	Gillingham	26,741		Premiership Rugby	Bath	31,626	
2019–20	Coventry City played all their home games at St. Andrews				Premiership Rugby	Harlequins	24,842	
2020–21	Coventry City played all their home games at St. Andrews				All games played behind closed doors due to COVID			
2021–22	Championship	AFC Bournemouth	24,492		Premiership Rugby	Northampton Saints	11,423	
2022–23	Championship	Birmingham City	30,175		Wasps no longer currently functioning as an active team.			
2023–24	Championship	Leeds United	30,232		Wasps no longer currently functioning as an active team.			
2024–25	Championship	Middlesbrough	31,452		Wasps no longer currently functioning as an active team.			
2025–26	Championship	Stoke City	31,516		Wasps no longer currently functioning as an active team.			

=== Average attendances ===
This table shows the average attendances for league matches played at the Coventry Building Society Arena for both Coventry City and Wasps.

	Coventry City			Wasps Rugby		
Season	Competition	Ave att	Ref	Competition	Ave att	Ref
2005–06	Championship	21,302		N/A	N/A	N/A
2006–07	Championship	20,342		N/A	N/A	N/A
2007–08	Championship	19,132		N/A	N/A	N/A
2008–09	Championship	17,451		N/A	N/A	N/A
2009–10	Championship	17,305		N/A	N/A	N/A
2010–11	Championship	16,309		N/A	N/A	N/A
2011–12	Championship	15,118		N/A	N/A	N/A
2012–13	League One	10,864		N/A	N/A	N/A
2013–14	N/A	N/A	N/A	N/A	N/A	N/A
2014–15	League One	9,700 (Note: The average attendance for the 2014–15 season does not include home matches played at Sixfields Stadium.)		Premiership Rugby	19,911 (Note: The average attendance for the 2014–15 season does not include home matches played at Adams Park.)	
2015–16	League One	12,570		Premiership Rugby	15,051	
2016–17	League One	9,118		Premiership Rugby	18,096	
2017–18	League Two	9,255		Premiership Rugby	17,904	
2018–19	League One	12,363		Premiership Rugby	16,161	
2019–20	N/A	N/A	N/A	Premiership Rugby	13,569 (Note: Does not include games played behind closed doors due to COVID.)	
2020–21	N/A	N/A	N/A	Games played behind closed doors due to COVID		
2021–22	Championship	19,541		Premiership Rugby	9,931	
2022–23	Championship	19,950		N/A	N/A	N/A
2023–24	Championship	25,468		N/A	N/A	N/A
2024–25	Championship	27,497		N/A	N/A	N/A

Football and Rugby Records

Record	Player	Opponent	Date
First CCFC goal scorer at The Arena	Claus Bech Jørgensen	Q.P.R.	20 August 2005
First Away goal scorer at The Arena	Ricardo Fuller	Southampton	29 August 2005
First CCFC Red Card at The Arena	Claus Bech Jørgensen	Crystal Palace	15 October 2005
First Away Red Card at The Arena	Mark Lynch	Hull City	24 September 2005
First CCFC Hat Trick at The Arena	Freddy Eastwood	Peterborough United	12 December 2009
First Wasps Try Scorer at The Arena	Joe Simpson	London Irish	21 December 2014
First Away Try Scorer at The Arena	Geoff Cross	London Irish	21 December 2014
Last Wasps Try Scorer at The Arena	Gabriel Oghre	Harlequins	7 November 2021
Last Awat Try Scorer at The Arena	Luke Northmore	Harlequins	7 November 2021

Hat Tricks Scored at The Arena

Player	Opponent	Competition	Date
Freddy Eastwood	Peterborough United	Championship	12 December 2009
Jacob Murphy	Gillingham	League One	21 November 2015
Jodi Jones	Notts County	League Two	5 August 2017
Marc McNulty	Grimsby Town	League Two	24 March 2018
Ellis Simms	Maidstone United	FA Cup	26 February 2024
Ellis Simms	Rotherham United	Championship	5 March 2024
Haji Wright	Sunderland	Championship	15 March 2025
Haji Wright	Middlesbrough	Championship	16 February 2026
