= Dick Howorth =

English cricketer

- Dick Howorth, c. 1947

Personal information
- Full name: Richard Howorth
- Born: 26 April 1909; Bacup, Lancashire, England
- Died: 2 April 1980 (aged 70); Worcester, England
- Batting: Left-handed
- Bowling: Slow left-arm orthodox

International information
- National side: England
- Test debut: 16 August 1947 v South Africa
- Last Test: 27 March 1948 v West Indies

Career statistics
Competition	Test	First-class
Matches	5	372
Runs scored	145	11,479
Batting average	18.12	20.68
100s/50s	0/0	4/52
Top score	45*	114
Balls bowled	1,536	71,812
Wickets	19	1,345
Bowling average	33.42	21.87
5 wickets in innings	1	74
10 wickets in match	0	7
Best bowling	6/124	7/18
Catches/stumpings	2/–	197/–
- Source: ESPNcricinfo, 10 September 2022

Richard Howorth (26 April 1909 – 2 April 1980) was an English cricketer who played as an all-rounder for Worcestershire County Cricket Club between 1933 and 1951. Chiefly remembered as a left-arm orthodox spin bowler, Howorth also occasionally bowled medium pace and was a capable hard-hitting left-handed batsman. Ideally he would bat in the middle of the order, but so weak was Worcestershire's batting for much of his career that Howorth would often play as an aggressive opener, and it was in this role that he hit his two highest first-class scores – both being 114. Howorth was also a dependable close-to-the-wicket fielder but would field with skill further out if needed.

As well as becoming one of the oldest English players to make his England debut at 38 years 112 days, Howorth took a wicket with his first ball in Test cricket, only the fifth Englishman to do so.

== Life and career ==
Born in Bacup, Lancashire, but not seen as good enough for an engagement after playing a few times for the Lancashire Second XI, and having played for Bacup in the Lancashire League, Howorth qualified for Worcestershire in 1933, and appeared against the West Indians that season. Seen as a promising all-rounder, he played a full season in 1934 but was disappointing. In 1935, however, Howorth suddenly jumped to the top flight of slow left-hand bowlers in county cricket, with a total of 121 wickets for Worcestershire at an average cost of less than nineteen runs each, and the following year he maintained his skill as a bowler and, called upon to open with Worcestershire's batting weakened by the absence of Cyril Walters and the Nawab of Pataudi, hit 114 out of 173 against Kent. The following year was disappointing, but in 1938 Howorth missed the double of 1,000 runs and 100 wickets by a mere three runs – scoring a century against Surrey at The Oval and taking a career-best 13 for 133 against Gloucestershire at Stourbridge. In 1939, he duly completed the double in the last match against Nottinghamshire, before World War II put an end to first-class cricket. Though he was then aged 37, 1946 was even more productive. Howorth hit two centuries against the Indian touring team, and in playing for H.D.G. Leveson-Gower's XI in September, he also took nine wickets for 72 runs.

However, it was not until 1947 that Howorth was seen as anything more than a county player. That season, in addition to scoring a personal best 1510 runs for an average of over 26, Howorth took 118 County Championship wickets and was second to Tom Goddard in the averages in a summer unsuited to bowlers. His 7 for 52 on an extremely docile Trent Bridge pitch was the finest performance of his career, and placed Howorth into representative consideration, which he reached in the last Test match with considerable success: he took a wicket with his first ball in Test cricket. In that summer, Howorth took 164 wickets and it is noteworthy that he did not once take ten wickets in a match. Surprisingly, he was overlooked when Wisden chose its Wisden Cricketers of the Year, and was never to get another chance. Although he was the best bowler in the Tests for a weak side in the West Indies the following winter, in 1948, despite wetter weather, Howorth was disappointing with both bat and ball. In his benefit year of 1949, he was again second to Goddard in the averages, and managed a career-best 7 for 18 on a turning pitch at Northampton (only Ken Higgs and Bishen Bedi have taken more first-class wickets without once taking eight in an innings).

Without achieving anything approaching his outstanding 1947 season, Howorth still headed Worcestershire's bowling averages in 1950 and 1951, but in the latter year his batting declined so much he only once reached fifty in an innings. However, it was still a surprise when early that summer he announced the 1951 season would be his last in county cricket, saying "I don't enjoy it as much as I used to" as a reason for this decision.

Howorth bought and ran a newsagent's shop located outside the New Road, Worcester cricket ground, and died in Worcester in April 1980, at the age of 70.
