= Peter Jackson (cricketer) =

Scottish born English cricketer

Percy Frederick Jackson (11 May 1911 – 27 April 1999) was a Scottish born English cricketer for Worcestershire County Cricket Club. He bowled offspin and was also known to take the new ball and bowl medium-paced outswingers. Jackson took 1159 first-class wickets at 26.31 and was a genuine tailender with a highest score of just 40 from his 549 innings.

Jackson holds the record for the most ducks in a season for Worcestershire, being dismissed for nought on no fewer than 16 occasions in 1935.
