= Travel de Courcey =

Transport company in England (1972–2020)

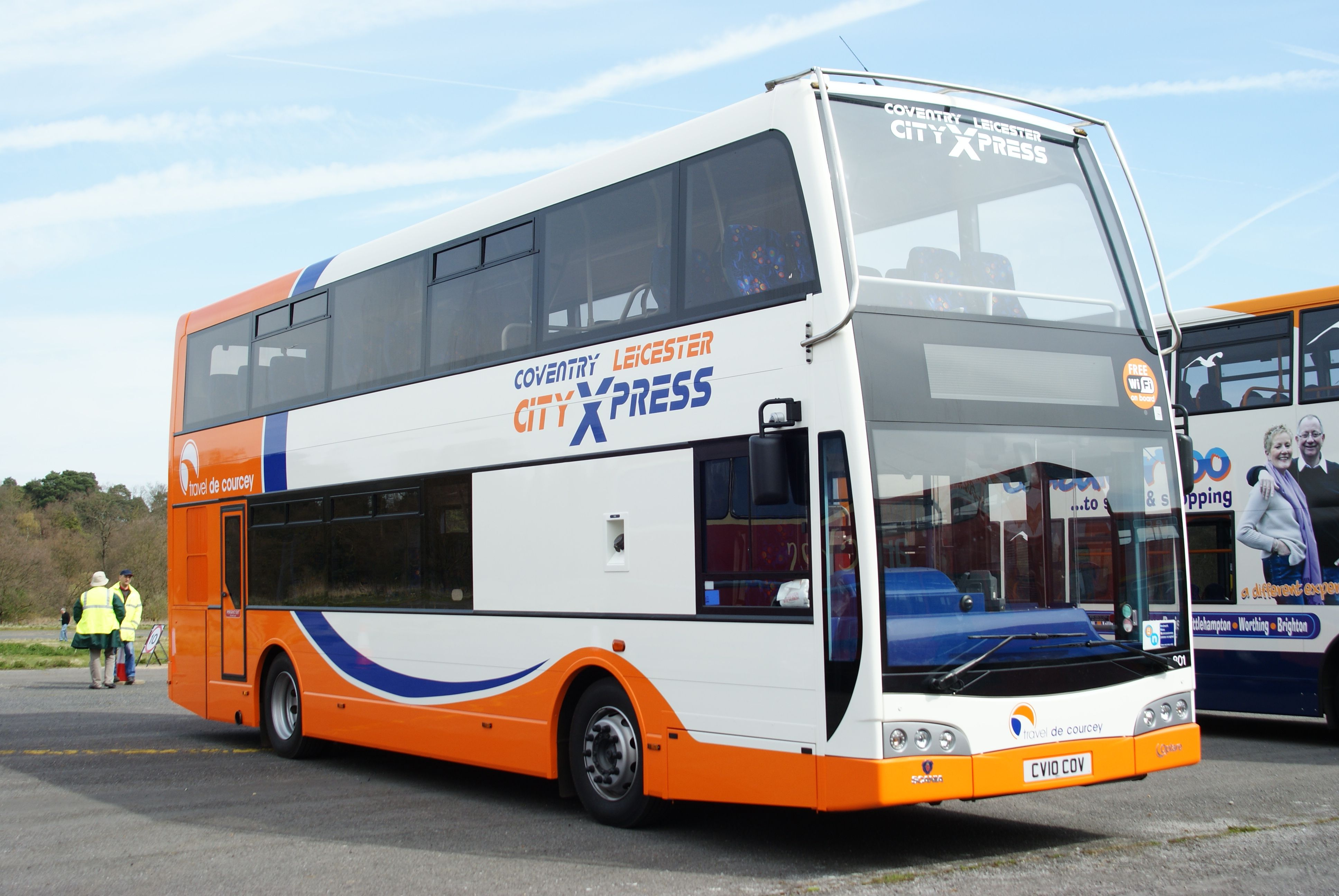
- Optare Olympus bodied Scania N230 in April 2010
- Founded: 1972; 54 years ago
- Defunct: 23 August 2020; 5 years ago
- Headquarters: Baginton, Coventry, United Kingdom
- Service area: Coventry; Warwickshire; Leicestershire
- Service type: Bus & coach services
- Depots: Baginton, Coventry (Main HQ); NEC Birmingham (NEC Shuttle Buses); Newtown, Birmingham (National Express Coaches)
- Chief executive: Adrian de Courcey (Chairman)

Travel de Courcey was a bus and coach operator based near Coventry in the West Midlands region of England. It operated local bus services in the Coventry and Warwickshire area and National Express contracts.

== History ==
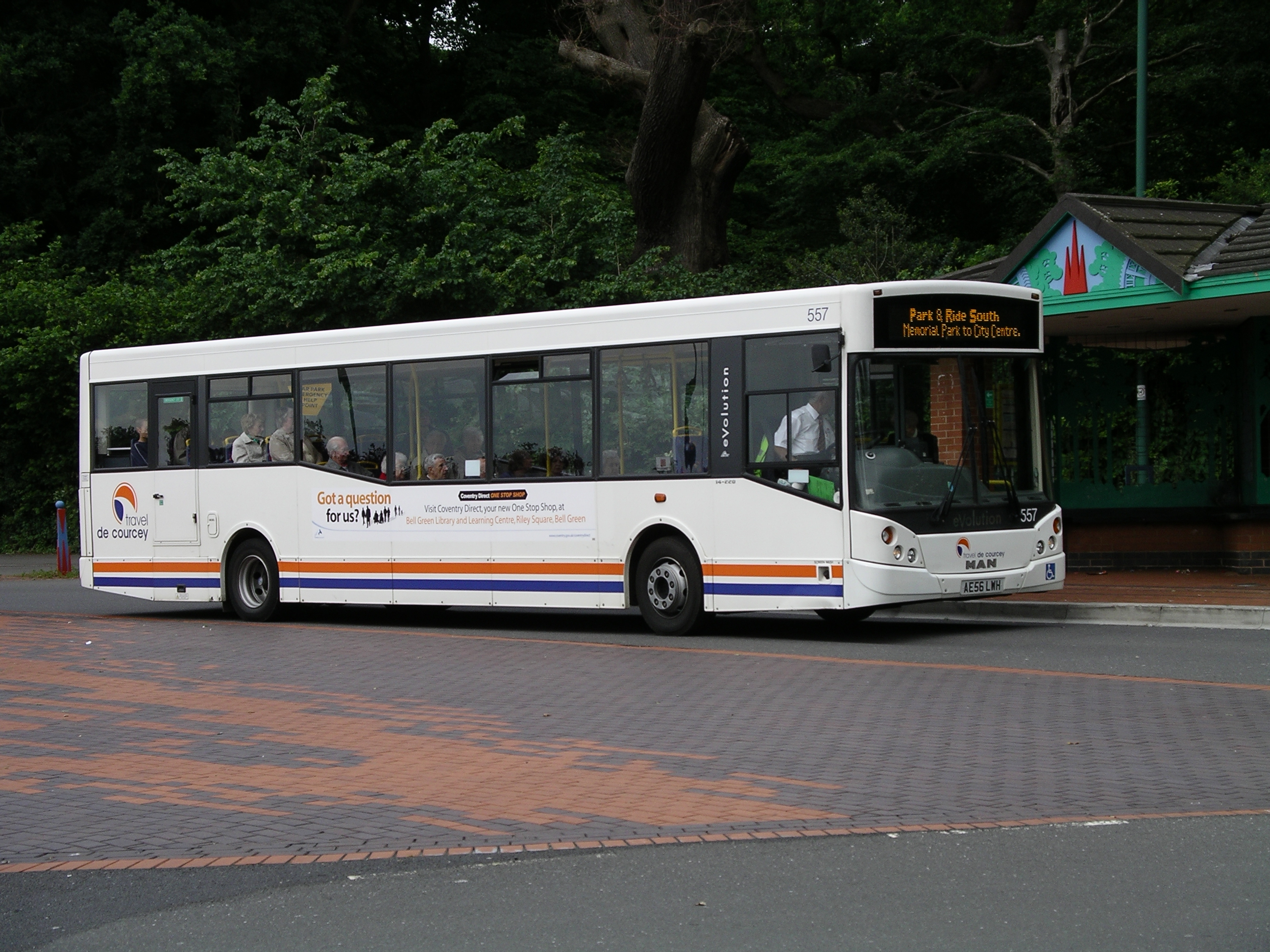
MCV Evolution bodied MAN 14.220 in May 2007

Mike de Courcey Travel was founded in 1972 by Mike de Courcey. It expanded into bus service operations after the Transport Act 1985 deregulated the UK bus industry.

In June 2011, Mike de Courcey Travel took over the Birmingham depot of Veolia Transport and several National Express contracts from them. In April 2017 Mike de Courcey Travel was awarded the Queen's Award for Enterprise in the sustainable development category.

On 24 August 2020, the operator fell into administration, citing a steep decline of passenger numbers in the wake of the COVID-19 pandemic. Stagecoach took over the running of the routes 60 and 703 and Arriva took over the running of route X6 between Leicester and Coventry.

== Services ==
Mike de Courcey Travel operated a number of local bus services, many from the University of Warwick, as well as school services under contract to Warwickshire County Council.

As of 2012, Mike de Courcey Travel operated services under contract to National Express on these routes:

- 210 Birmingham – Gatwick Airport
- 325 Birmingham – Manchester
- 384 Birmingham – Llandudno
- 387 Coventry – Blackpool
- 410 Wolverhampton – London
- 420 Wolverhampton – London
- 540 Manchester – London

Former significant bus routes:

- Until July 2016, Travel de Courcey operated 360A/360C Coventry City Circular, the longest urban bus route in Europe at 31 miles.
