= Peter Richardson (cricketer) =

English cricketer

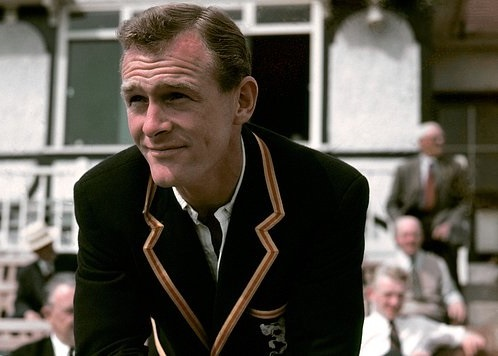

Personal information
- Full name: Peter Edward Richardson
- Born: 4 July 1931; Hereford, England
- Died: 17 February 2017 (aged 85); Ashford, Kent
- Batting: Left-handed
- Bowling: Right arm off spin

International information
- National side: England
- Test debut (cap 382): 7 June 1956 v Australia
- Last Test: 9 July 1963 v West Indies

Domestic team information
- Years: Team
- 1949–1958: Worcestershire
- 1959–1965: Kent

Career statistics
| Competition | Test | FC | LA |
|---|---|---|---|
| Matches | 34 | 454 | 3 |
| Runs scored | 2,061 | 26,055 | 168 |
| Batting average | 37.47 | 34.60 | 56.00 |
| 100s/50s | 5/9 | 44/140 | 1/0 |
| Top score | 126 | 185 | 127 |
| Balls bowled | 120 | 763 | – |
| Wickets | 3 | 11 | – |
| Bowling average | 16.00 | 45.36 | – |
| 5 wickets in innings | 0 | 0 | – |
| 10 wickets in match | 0 | 0 | – |
| Best bowling | 2/10 | 2/10 | – |
| Catches/stumpings | 6/– | 220/– | 0/– |
- Source: ESPNcricinfo, 20 July 2009

Peter Edward Richardson (4 July 1931 – 17 February 2017) was an English cricketer, who played for Worcestershire and Kent County Cricket Clubs and in 34 Test matches for the England cricket team.

Colin Bateman, the one-time Daily Express cricket correspondent, noted, "Peter Richardson was one of cricket's great characters...off the field he was a one-man entertainment show, particularly when the troops were stuck in some up-country billet in India. His sense of humour and sharp mind enlivened many a dull official function to the delight of his teammates. His love of a prank continued after his playing days with outrageous letters from fictitious Colonel Blimps to The Daily Telegraph."

== Life and career ==
A left-handed opening batsman, Richardson played as an amateur for Worcestershire and was a near-instant success on his arrival as a regular in the side in 1952. Four years later, he had a similarly quick impact in his first Test series, the 1956 Ashes series, scoring 81 and 73 in his first match, and following it up with 104 at Old Trafford in a match famous for Jim Laker's 19 wickets. He went on to score 491 Test runs that year, the most in the world. He was a first choice opening batsman for England for a further two home series, but then had a poor series in Australia in 1958–59, when England lost the Ashes comprehensively. He was voted one of the Wisden Cricketers of the Year in 1957.

In the summer of 1958, Richardson announced that he wanted to become a professional and to move to Kent. Worcestershire opposed the move, and Richardson was effectively barred from competitive cricket during the English 1959 season, losing his Test place too while he waited to qualify for his new county. By the time he resumed his county career in 1960 other left-handed opening batsmen, such as Geoff Pullar and Raman Subba Row, had moved ahead of him in the competition for England places.

Richardson played on for Kent until his retirement from cricket in 1965. He toured Pakistan and India in 1961–62, mostly batting down the order, but played only one further Test match in England, in 1963 against the West Indies, when he made only 2 and 14 against a bowling attack spearheaded by Wes Hall and Charlie Griffith.

Richardson captained Commonwealth XI teams to Pakistan in 1963–64 and India in 1964–65.

Richardson's two brothers also played first-class cricket. Dick Richardson was a middle-order batsman for Worcestershire who played one Test for England against the West Indies in 1957, playing alongside his brother, "the first time... [in the 20th century] of siblings appearing in the same team for England". His other brother, Bryan, was an occasional player for Warwickshire.

Richardson died on 17 February 2017, aged 85.

Sporting positions
| Preceded by Reg Perks | Worcestershire County Cricket Captain; 1956–1958 | Succeeded by Don Kenyon |
