= Arctic Spas =

Brand of portable electric hot tubs

Blue Falls Manufacturing
- Type: Privately held company
- Traded as: Arctic Spas
- Industry: Hot tub manufacturing
- Founded: Thorsby, Alberta, Canada (1994)
- Headquarters: Thorsby, Alberta, Canada
- Number of locations: 173 Showrooms (2025)
- Area served: Canada, United States, Europe, Norway, Iceland, Middle East, Asia
- Products: Hot Tubs, All Weather Pools, Chemicals
- Production output: Manufacturing Plant, Thorsby, Alberta Manufacturing Plant, Edmonton, Alberta Manufacturing Plant, Breton, Alberta Manufacturing Plant, Spokane, Washington
- Number of employees: 250+
- Divisions: Corporate Retail, Authorized Dealers
- Website: arcticspas.com

Arctic Spas is Blue Falls Manufacturing's flagship brand of hot tubs, developed as a niche product for cold climates. The hot tubs and All-Weather pools are made and manufactured in Canada and the United States, and are sold in showrooms throughout Canada, the United States, Europe, and the Middle East.

== History and growth ==
Blue Falls Manufacturing was founded in the late 1980s as Koko Beach Hot Tub Manufacturing in Edmonton, Alberta. It was purchased in 1997 by its current owners, who were employees of Blue Falls just before its sale in 1994. The new owners soon began producing the Arctic Spas brand.

In 2001 the company moved to Thorsby and constructed a 70,000-square-foot (6,500 m^{2}) facility (later expanded to 100,000 square feet (9,300 m^{2})), largely because land for a new factory was much cheaper in Thorsby than in Edmonton. In 2003, the company purchased a 90,000-square-foot (8,400 m^{2}) facility in Coleman, Alberta to manufacture some of their models, which would later close. The company would later open smaller plants in Edmonton, Breton, and Spokane, Washington.

The company relies on winter climate branding and energy-efficient technology; testing by provincial authority Alberta Innovates Technology Futures (then the Alberta Research Council) determined that Arctic Spas hot tubs were thirty percent more energy efficient than the competitors that they tested.

In early 2013 they launched a brand of swimming machine, called the All-Weather Pool.

In late 2023, COLDTUB, a brand of cold water therapy tubs, partnered with Arctic Spas to start selling their products in authorized locations.

=== Overseas operations ===
The company focused on the European export market from the beginning, especially the colder climates of Scandinavia and Eastern Europe. The company formed joint partnerships in order to maintain control of their brand.

They also opened a distribution centre in Ireland, which went into liquidation in 2007.

Arctic Spas has partnerships with Polarbad for the Scandinavian market, and Arctic Spas UK oversees the stores in the United Kingdom.

== Industry recognition and awards ==
- June 2003: Recognized by Profit Magazine as being in the top 100 of Canada's Fastest Growing Businesses
- June 2004: Ranked by Profit Magazine as one of Canada's 100 Fastest Growing Businesses
- June 2005: Profit Magazine ranks BFM among Canada's Fastest Growing Businesses
- September 2005: Owners named Ernst & Young 2005 Entrepreneurs of the Year (Prairies Region, Manufacturing Category)
- January 2006: Ranks as one of Alberta's 50 Fastest Growing Companies
- February 2006: Named one of Canada's 50 Best Managed Companies
- May 2006: CAD designer Pete Van't Hoff wins International Business Award (Best Product Developer)
- June 2003 – 2012: Arctic Spas wins 5-Star Best Of Class Awards for the Pool & Spa Industry
- October 2019: EY Entrepreneur Of The Year 2019 Prairies winner
