= Dick Richardson (cricketer) =

English cricketer

Personal information
- Full name: Derek Walter Richardson
- Born: 3 November 1934 (age 92); Hereford, England
- Batting: Left-handed
- Bowling: Left-arm medium
- Relatives: Peter Richardson (brother); Bryan Richardson (brother)

International information
- National side: England

Career statistics
Competition	Tests	First-class
Matches	1	383
Runs scored	33	16303
Batting average	33.00	27.39
100s/50s	0/0	16/89
Top score	33	169
Balls bowled	0	588
Wickets	–	8
Bowling average	–	44.25
5 wickets in innings	–	0
10 wickets in match	–	0
Best bowling	–	2/11
Catches/stumpings	1/–	422/–
- Source: Cricinfo, 10 May 2020

Derek Walter "Dick" Richardson (born 3 November 1934) is an English former cricketer, who played in one Test for England in 1957. His county cricket career was spent entirely with Worcestershire.

The cricket writer Colin Bateman noted, "Richardson's Test career was brief but historic. When he played in the same team as his more famous brother, Peter, at Trent Bridge in 1957 against the West Indies, it was the first time... [in the 20th century] of siblings appearing in the same team for England".

== Life and career ==
Born in Hereford, England, and educated at Hereford Cathedral School, the younger brother of England opening batsman Peter Richardson, Dick Richardson was a middle-order left-handed batsman and a fine fielder in close catching positions. Unlike his older brother, Dick spent most of his time with Worcestershire as a professional, and remained with the county throughout his first-class cricket career.

Playing regularly for the county from 1955, Richardson made 1,000 runs for the first time in the following season when he turned professional, and, in 1957, came right to the forefront with 1,830 runs at an average of 32 runs per innings. He was picked, alongside his brother, for the third Test match against West Indies at Trent Bridge. Coming into bat on a batsman's wicket when England, largely through Tom Graveney's 258, had already scored 510 for four wickets, Richardson made 33 in seventy minutes. It was not enough to keep his place. David Sheppard, by 1957 a part-time cricketer, was available for the remaining two Tests of the series and was preferred. Richardson was never selected again.

His career went into a fairly steep decline in 1958: he completed 1,000 runs, just, but his highest score for the season was only 60. It is likely that this is the lowest top score ever by a batsman completing 1,000 runs in an English cricket season. Richardson may have been unsettled by the dispute between Worcestershire and his brother, who was the amateur county captain, over Peter Richardson's desire to turn professional. Peter Richardson left the county at the end of the season, and signed for Kent, but Worcestershire contested the registration, and the player was forced to sit out the 1959 season while he qualified for his new county.

Dick Richardson's career recovered, to the extent that he made significantly over 1,500 runs for Worcestershire in each of the four seasons from 1959 to 1962, and from 1961 he was among the top fieldsmen in England. His 65 catches in 1961 remains the Worcestershire county record, and he holds five out of the top 10 season's fielding records for the county. His career total of 412 catches for Worcestershire is a record for a non-wicketkeeper too.

From 1963 onwards, Richardson's fielding ensured his continued selection for Worcestershire as his batting became less reliable, and he was a regular member of the side that won, for the first time, the County Championship in 1964, and again the following year. In 1965, however, he failed to complete his 1,000 runs, and there was further decline in 1966. He lost his place in the Worcestershire team in 1967, and left first-class cricket at the end of that season at the age of only 32.

Apart from Peter Richardson, Dick Richardson's younger brother, Bryan, was also a first-class cricketer, playing intermittently for Warwickshire.
