= Arena Park Shopping Centre =

Shopping park in Coventry, England

- Location: Rowleys Green, Coventry, England
- Coordinates: 52°26′38.4″N 1°29′34.8″W
- Address: Arena Shopping Park, Classic Drive, Rowleys Green, Coventry, CV6 6AS
- Opened: 2006
- Manager: GVA Grimley
- Owner: Tesco
- Num. of anchor tenants: 2 (Tesco Extra and Marks and Spencer)
- Floor area: 226,620 sq ft (21,054 m^{2})
- Floors: Varies
- Parking: 1,600
- Website: www.arenashopping.com

Arena Park Shopping Centre is a shopping park in Coventry, England. It is located in the north of the city and adjacent to the boundary with the Nuneaton and Bedworth district of Warwickshire. It was constructed at the same time as the neighbouring Coventry Building Society Arena where Coventry City play at, from which it takes its name. It was built upon the site of the former Foleshill Gasworks which encompassed the area of the Shopping Centre and the arena. It is owned by Tesco plc. It is sometimes mistakenly referred to as Arena Shopping Park.

== Transport ==
The shopping park can be accessed from the A444 Phoenix Way, which links it to Coventry city centre, Bedworth, Nuneaton and the M6 Junction 3. The Shopping Centre is served by a number of bus routes, some serving the bus hub at the southern edge of the site, and some serving the site from Longford Road (B4113). The routes serving Longford Road are those connecting Coventry with Bedworth, Nuneaton, Atherstone or Leicester and other parts of the city; these are also operated by Stagecoach in Warwickshire or West Midlands Bus. The routes serving the bus hub in the centre link it with the city centre and other suburbs, routes 78 and 78A connect it to University Hospital Coventry, and are operated by Arriva Midlands.

The centre is also located adjacent to Coventry Arena railway station, which is served by one train per hour in each direction to Nuneaton and Coventry, with southbound trains continuing to Kenilworth and Leamington Spa. The station is situated to the north-west of the site, with the railway line passing between the shopping centre and the arena.

== Retailers ==
The centre is split into two distinct areas, firstly the shopping park containing the larger units, and secondly the mall along the front of the Tesco Extra store containing smaller units. The tenants in the Shopping Park section are Marks and Spencer, Boots, next, With A Costa Coffee JD Sports and Starbucks Currys Decathlon Just for Pets . The mall contains the centre's Tesco Extra store, CeX, Johnsons Dry Cleaners, Elliot Reeve, Timpsons, Card Factory, Shoezone, Coventry Building Society and TUI UK And O2 (UK) And Specsavers And Nando's And Subway . It is also home to the Arena Park Library. It formerly contained a Borders bookstore with a Starbucks, this was from the opening of the centre until the chain went into administration and all stores were closed on 23 December 2009. In July 2010, it was announced that New Look were to move into the former Borders store. Their store opened on 9 September 2010, including a Starbucks Coffee.

Fast food outlets located on the periphery of the car park include, Burger King. The Tesco petrol station is also located adjacent to these outlets.

In 2012 A joint venture between Aviva Investors and Tesco is undertaking a 60,000 sq ft extension to the Coventry Arena Shopping Park after signing two pre-lets. Sports retailer Decathlon will open a 30,000 sq ft store and Next Home a 10,000 sq ft shop.
