= Harold Gibbons (cricketer) =

English cricketer

Harold Harry Ian Haywood Gibbons (8 October 1904 – 16 February 1973), sometimes known as "Doc" Gibbons, was an English first-class cricketer: a right-handed opening batsman and occasional right-arm bowler who was the first man to win a county cap for Worcestershire, as well as a reliable fielder in the deep.

Gibbons made his first-class debut for Worcestershire against the touring New Zealanders at New Road in June 1927, making 19 and 17, and taking 2–27 in the first innings, which was to remain his best bowling. He retained his place for the rest of the season, but did not set the world alight. However, the next year was another matter, as he scored four hundreds, including an unbeaten 200 against the West Indians in July. In this year, he was capped by his county: the first cap Worcestershire had awarded.

He continued to play a key role for his county up until the Second World War, forging a very useful opening partnership with Cyril Walters in the early 1930s. Most years Gibbons averaged in the thirties, and in 1933 he passed 2,000 runs in a season for the first time. Then in 1934 he had the best summer of his career, scoring 2,654 runs at 52.03 with eight centuries; this remains the highest season's aggregate for the county. Indeed, a purple patch in late May and early June of that year produced successive scores of 93, 7, 88, 104, 157, 70*, 100 and 129.

Never again did Gibbons quite reach the heights of 1934, although he did pass 2,000 runs once more, when averaging 43.26 in 1938. The following year he recorded his career-best innings when he hit 212 not out against Northamptonshire, but the Second World War intervened, and though he returned to play three matches for Worcestershire in 1946, he was not a success and his career came to an end.

Gibbons scored first-class hundreds against all the other counties with the single exception of Somerset. Nevertheless, he was never capped by England, and had to content himself with appearances for the Players and the North of England, both in 1928, as well as a benefit season ten years later.

He died in Worcester at the age of 68.
