= Jack Flavell =

English cricketer (1929–2004)

Personal information
- Full name: John Alfred Flavell
- Born: 15 May 1929; Wall Heath, Staffordshire, England
- Died: 25 February 2004 (aged 74); Barmouth, Gwynedd, Wales
- Height: 5 ft 10.5 in (1.79 m)
- Batting: Left-handed
- Bowling: Right-arm fast-medium
- Role: Bowler

International information
- National side: England (1961–1964)
- Test debut (cap 403): 27 July 1961 v Australia
- Last Test: 2 July 1964 v Australia

Career statistics
Competition	Test	First-class	List A
Matches	4	401	11
Runs scored	31	2,032	18
Batting average	7.75	6.53	3.60
100s/50s	0/0	0/1	0/0
Top score	14	54	9
Balls bowled	792	72,700	782
Wickets	7	1,529	33
Bowling average	52.42	21.48	9.75
5 wickets in innings	0	86	3
10 wickets in match	0	15	0
Best bowling	2/65	9/30	6/14
Catches/stumpings	0/–	128/–	3/ –
- Source: CricInfo, 10 September 2022

Jack Flavell (15 May 1929 – 25 February 2004) was an English cricketer who played in four Tests for England from 1961 to 1964. His county cricket career was spent with Worcestershire, with whom Flavell won two County Championship titles. His new ball bowling partnership with Len Coldwell was one of the most feared and respected in the 1960s.

== Life and career ==
John Alfred Flavell was born in Wall Heath, Staffordshire. After turning down the offer of a contract at Warwickshire, Flavell began his Worcestershire career in 1949 as an out and out fast bowler, earning himself the nickname of ‘Mad Jack’. After suffering a back injury, he cut his run and concentrated on accuracy and generating movement off the seam. Unusually for a fast bowler, he was more effective in his thirties than he had been in his twenties, and became one of the most prolific and feared opening bowlers in the County Championship. He claimed 100 wickets or more in a season on eight occasions, and topped the averages in 1961, when he took 171 wickets at 17.79.

He took three hat-tricks – against Kent in 1951, Cambridge University in 1953 and Lancashire in 1963. In the Lancashire game, each batsman was dismissed LBW, a testament to his unrelenting attack on middle stump. He bagged nine wickets in an innings on three occasions, with a best of 9 for 30 against Kent in 1955. Having taken 9 for 90 at Hastings, he was denied a chance to take all ten when Sussex declared at tea. In all, appetite for long spells, and ability to shrug off a succession of hamstring and ankle injuries, earned him 1,529 wickets in 401 first-class appearances. From 1957 to 1961 he averaged 970 overs in a season, bowling 1,037 in 1960 and 1,245 in 1961.

In partnership with Len Coldwell, he spearheaded Worcestershire's two championship winning campaigns in 1964, when he took 101 wickets, and 1965 when he bagged 132 at 14.99. Coming back from injury in 1964, with Worcestershire's push for the title stalling, he took forty-six wickets in five matches between 8 and 25 August at just 11.71, taking nine in an innings against Middlesex. He almost helped Worcestershire to a championship hat trick in 1966, bagging 135 at 14 at the age of 37, before retiring the following year. In 1968, John Arlott wrote that “for a decade he [Coldwell] and Flavell have been as consistently hostile an opening pair as any in the country, not merely for the penetrative quality of their best bowling but because of their combination of persistent accuracy, stamina and edge, giving the batsmen nothing and harrying them, over after over, for long spells”.

He represented his country in just four Test matches, against Australia in 1961 and 1964, and was unlucky to play in an era when England could call on Fred Trueman, Brian Statham and Frank Tyson. As late as 1964, E.W. Swanton wrote that "Among first-class cricketers as many hold the view that Flavell is the best opening bowler in the country as do the same for Statham". His benefit in 1963 brought him a county record of £6,480 and he was one of Wisden Cricketers of the Year in 1965.

He retired just as one-day cricket was beginning to take root in county cricket, his accurate bowling earning him thirty three wickets at just 9.75. Flavell had no pretensions as a left-handed batsman, but scored his only first-class fifty against arch rivals Warwickshire at Dudley in 1959, and also in partnership with the still-worse “rabbit” Bob Carter won Worcestershire a vital one-wicket victory over Nottinghamshire with two fours.

A talented all round sportsman, Flavell's cricket career almost ended before it began, due to his talent for soccer. He played for West Bromwich Albion, with whom he signed professional terms at 17, and Walsall. In 1948 he played in the Army cup final at Aldershot, when lightning killed two players and burned the hair from his head. He was a successful amateur golfer and captained Enville Golf Club.

After retirement, with his wife Marie, Flavell ran The Rafters Restaurant near Wolverhampton, and then a guest house in Barmouth, Gwynedd, Wales. He died in his sleep in Barmouth in February 2004, at the age of 74.
