= Bryan Richardson =

English cricketer

Personal information
- Full name: Bryan Anthony Richardson
- Born: 24 February 1944 (age 82); Kenilworth, Warwickshire, England
- Batting: Left-handed
- Bowling: Leg break
- Relatives: Peter Richardson (brother); Dick Richardson (brother)

Domestic team information
- Years: Team
- 1963–1967: Warwickshire

Career statistics
Competition	First-class	List A
Matches	40	1
Runs scored	1,323	17
Batting average	19.45	17.00
100s/50s	2/5	0/0
Top score	126	17
Balls bowled	240	–
Wickets	1	–
Bowling average	157.00	–
5 wickets in innings	0	–
10 wickets in match	0	–
Best bowling	1/32	–
Catches/stumpings	28/–	0/–
- Source: Cricinfo, 13 July 2012

Bryan Anthony Richardson (born 24 February 1944) is a former English cricketer. Richardson was a left-handed batsman who played first-class cricket for Warwickshire from 1963 to 1967. He was born at Kenilworth, Warwickshire.

Richardson made his first-class debut for Warwickshire against Scotland in 1963 at The Grange, Edinburgh. He played first-class cricket for Warwickshire for five seasons, making a total of 40 appearances, the last of which came in the 1967 County Championship against Yorkshire at Acklam Park, Middlesbrough. He scored a total of 1,323 runs at an average of 19.45, with a high score of 126. against Cambridge University in 1967. This season was also his most successful, with 727 runs at an average of 30.29, including both his first-class centuries, as well as three half-centuries. He also made a single List A appearance for the county in the quarter-final of the 1964 Gillette Cup against Northamptonshire. In what was a Warwickshire victory, Richardson scored 17 runs before being dismissed by Brian Crump.

His brothers, Peter and Dick, both played Test cricket for England.

He was chairman of Coventry City F.C. from 1993 until 2002.
