= Frederick Bowley (cricketer, born 1873) =

Welsh cricketer

Personal information
- Full name: Frederick Lloyd Bowley
- Born: 9 November 1873; Brecon, Wales
- Died: 31 May 1943 (aged 69); Worcester, England
- Batting: Right-handed

Career statistics
| Competition | First-class |
|---|---|
| Matches | 405 |
| Runs scored | 21,122 |
| Batting average | 29.62 |
| 100s/50s | 38/99 |
| Top score | 276 |
| Balls bowled | 126 |
| Wickets | 4 |
| Bowling average | 25.25 |
| 5 wickets in innings | 0 |
| 10 wickets in match | 0 |
| Best bowling | 1-6 |
| Catches/stumpings | 150/0 |
- Source: CricketArchive

Frederick Lloyd Bowley (9 November 1873 – 31 May 1943) was a first-class cricketer who played county cricket for Worcestershire from the 1890s to the 1920s. He also represented the Players against the Gentlemen on four occasions.

== Career ==
Having appeared for Worcestershire on a number of occasions before its elevation to the County Championship, Bowley made his first-class debut in Worcestershire's second match at that level, against Sussex at Hove in mid-May 1899. He opened the batting with Wilfrid Foster, but was bowled for 4 in each innings, though he did take a catch to dismiss opposing captain Billy Murdoch. Four further games that season produced a highest score of just 21.

After a near miss with 95 against Sussex a few days earlier, Bowley scored his maiden hundred by hitting 118 against Hampshire at the end of May 1900. Although he made no further centuries that summer, he did pass a thousand runs for the season, averaging just over 24. For several years thereafter he was a significant contributor to Worcestershire's batting, enjoying the most productive season of his career in 1906 when he hit 1,629 first-class runs (1,466 of them for Worcestershire) with two hundreds and 11 fifties.

He played rather fewer games in 1907 and 1908, and came nowhere near his thousand runs in either season, but from 1909 until first-class cricket was interrupted by the First World War he achieved the mark every year except 1912. In June 1914 he made his highest score, 276 against Hampshire at Dudley; this established a county record that survived until surpassed by Glenn Turner's 311* 68 years later.

Bowley was well into his forties when county cricket resumed in 1919, but he nevertheless played on for several years and scoring consistently in a weak Worcestershire side. His highest post-war innings was the 188 he hit against Somerset in 1921, and that season he passed 1,000 runs for the 14th and last time, falling just short with 974 in 1922. He played one further first-class match, against Hampshire in May 1923, aged 49, but made just 0 and 5 as Worcestershire slipped to a two-day innings defeat.

His bowling was of the strictly occasional variety, but he did take four wickets in first-class cricket, his first and last victims (Albert Relf in 1900 and Jack Board in 1904) being Test players.

== Notes ==
- Cricinfo gives Bowley's career aggregate of catches as 148 rather than 150.
