= Whitmore Park =

Suburb of Coventry, England

Coordinates: 52.438°N 1.518°W

Whitmore Park is a suburban area of Coventry, situated in the north of the city and bordering the suburbs of Keresley, Holbrooks, and Radford. It is served by Whitmore Park and Holy Family RC primary schools, with pupils then attending President Kennedy Comprehensive School or Cardinal Newman RC School (both in nearby Keresley) for secondary education.

Whitmore Park's primary public transport access is via the 13 bus route, previously known as Whitmore Park until its northern extension to the Prologis Business Park. The route includes Beake Avenue, Whitmore Park's main thoroughfare. These buses alternate between a direct route to Radford Road and Coventry City Centre and a route via Jubilee Crescent, giving residents easy access to the range of shops at Jubilee Crescent. Whitmore Park is also served by a small parade of shops curving round from Glentworth Avenue to Beake Avenue, including a fish and chip shop, newsagents, hairdressers and a chemist. The parade also includes an off-licence and food outlets. The site of a former petrol station at the end of the parade retains its car repair works and car wash.
