= Len Coldwell =

English cricketer (1933–1996)

- Len Coldwell in 1962

Personal information
- Full name: Leonard John Coldwell
- Born: 10 January 1933; Newton Abbot, Devon, England
- Died: 6 August 1996 (aged 63); Teignmouth, Devon, England
- Batting: Right-handed
- Bowling: Right-arm fast-medium

International information
- National side: England
- Test debut: 21 June 1962 v Pakistan
- Last Test: 18 June 1964 v Australia

Career statistics
Competition	Test	First-class
Matches	7	310
Runs scored	9	1,474
Batting average	4.50	5.96
100s/50s	0/0	0/0
Top score	6*	37
Balls bowled	1,668	56,235
Wickets	22	1,076
Bowling average	27.72	21.18
5 wickets in innings	1	60
10 wickets in match	0	7
Best bowling	6/85	8/38
Catches/stumpings	1/–	90/–
- Source: CricInfo, 7 November 2022

Leonard John Coldwell (10 January 1933 – 6 August 1996) was an English cricketer, who played in seven Tests for England from 1962 to 1964. Coldwell was a right-arm fast-medium bowler who was, for a few years in the early to mid-1960s, half of a respected and feared new-ball partnership in English county cricket. With his bowling partner Jack Flavell, Coldwell was the attacking force behind the unprecedented success of Worcestershire which brought the county its first successes in the County Championship in 1964 and 1965.

In 1961, Coldwell took 140 wickets and finished sixth in the national averages; the following year, his best, he took 152 wickets and was fourth.

== Life and career ==
Born in Newton Abbot, Coldwell was a Devonian who played Minor Counties cricket before being signed by Worcestershire in 1955. Coldwell bowled mainly in-swingers and varied both pace and line depending on the stance of the batsman. Inclined to be expensive in his early years, and one of a pack of medium to fast-medium bowlers competing to be Flavell's new-ball partner at Worcester, he came to the fore in 1960 when his rivals, Aldridge and Pearson, were accused of having suspect bowling actions. In 1961, Flavell and Coldwell bowled Worcestershire to fourth in the Championship, and Flavell was picked for Tests. In 1962, when Flavell was injured for part of the season, Coldwell bowled more than 1,100 overs and was himself picked for two Tests, and the county finished second, its highest ever position at that time.

In his first Test match against Pakistan at Lord's, Coldwell took the wicket of Imtiaz Ahmed in his first over and finished with three wickets for 25 runs in the first innings, following that up with six for 85 in the second innings. His haul of 9 for 110 was his best Test return. Despite this, he was replaced by Brian Statham for the next Test, and not recalled until the last game of the five-match series, where he took four further wickets. His 13 wickets at an average of under 18 runs per wicket put him at the head of England's bowling averages for the season.

He toured Australia and New Zealand in 1962–63, but was less successful there, playing in three Tests but taking only five wickets. In 1963, Coldwell was injured early in the season, and took only 21 wickets. Returned to fitness in 1964, Coldwell took 98 wickets at 15.48 each and was second in the national averages as Worcestershire won the Championship for the first time; he also played in the first two Tests against Australia, playing alongside Flavell in a Test match for the only time in the first match at Trent Bridge. He took only four wickets in the two Tests, and was dropped. He never played Test cricket again.

Coldwell was an important part of the Worcestershire side that retained the Championship in 1965. But he was increasingly affected by hip and knee injuries, and his wicket tally declined across the later 1960s, and he retired during the 1969 season, returning to Devon.

Coldwell was not much of a batsman: in 15 years of first-class cricket, he failed to reach 40 runs in an innings.

Coldwell died in Teignmouth, Devon in August 1996, at the age of 63.
