= Worcestershire County Cricket League =

English club cricket league

The Worcestershire County Cricket League (WCL) is an English club cricket league consisting of club teams primarily from Worcestershire and Herefordshire, along with several other clubs from bordering counties Shropshire, Staffordshire and Warwickshire, as well as Wales.

== History ==
The Worcestershire County Cricket League was created in 1999 as part of the new 'pyramid system' in English club cricket, and acts as a feeder league to the Birmingham and District Premier League. It was formed mainly as a merger between the old Worcestershire Clubs League and the Autobag/Plumb Centre League. Other clubs came from the Midland Combined Counties League, the 3D Cricket PLJ League, and in the case of Herefordshire sides, the Marches Cricket League and the Willowsticks Three Counties Cricket League. For the 2023 season the WCL took over the administration of the Marches League (the only open age cricket league based in Herefordshire, which also included some clubs from Wales), thereby adding another 29 sides and 17 new clubs to the WCL structure. The Marches League was finally disbanded after the 2024 season and fully absorbed into the WCL structure for the 2025 season.

There is promotion and relegation and most divisions of the league operate on a two up/two down basis, although the feeder league status means that more than two sides may be relegated from the Premier Division, with knock-on effects on other divisions, if one or more Worcestershire (or Herefordshire) side is relegated from Birmingham League 'Premier Division Two'. Other exceptions to this are in the Premier Division (where the winner is only promoted to the Birmingham and District Premier League if they finish in the top 2 out of the 4 feeder league champions, after a round-robin competition between the 4 clubs at the end of the season).

In the three regionalised Division 7 divisions (North, Central and South) the winners go up to Division 6 (from where the bottom three sides are relegated) and the two bottom placed teams in each of the three division 7 regional divisions are relegated to the Division 8 regional divisions. In the four regionalised Division 8 divisions (North, South, East, & West) the winners of each of the divisions go up to Division 7 and the four runners-up go into end of season playoffs, with the two winners of the playoffs also going into Divisions 7 North, Central or South for the following season.

Winners of Division 1/Premier Division of the Worcestershire County Cricket League, who have been promoted to the Birmingham and District Premier League, since 1999 are:

WCL Division 1

- 1999: Hagley
- 2000: Redditch
- 2001: Kington
- 2002: Old Elizabethans
- 2003: Evesham
- 2004: Pershore
- 2005: Ombersley
- 2006: Kington
- 2007: Brockhampton
- 2008: Eastnor
- 2009: Pershore
- 2010: Barnards Green
- 2011: Stourbridge
- 2012: Worcester Nomads
- 2013: Astwood Bank
- 2014: Worcester
- 2015: Pershore
- 2016: Worcester Nomads
- 2017: Redditch
- 2018: Bewdley* (no promotion)

WCL Premier Division

- 2019: Astwood Bank (not promoted after finishing 3rd in Birmingham League playoffs)
- 2020: Pershore** (no promotion, won a shortened season played in a regional format followed by playoffs)
- 2021: Stourbridge (not promoted after finishing 3rd in Birmingham League playoffs)
- 2022: Stourport (ruled ineligible for promotion to Birmingham League. Second-placed Old Hill took their place in the playoffs: they were not promoted after finishing 3rd)
- 2023: Old Hill (promoted after finishing 1st in Birmingham League playoffs)
- 2024: Stourbridge (promoted after finishing joint 1st in Birmingham League playoffs)
- 2025: Stourport (not promoted after finishing 3rd in Birmingham League playoffs)
- 2026: Brockhampton (ruled ineligible for promotion to Birmingham League. Second-placed Stourport took their place in the playoffs: they were promoted after finished 2nd)

In 2018 there was no promotion from any of the four county feeder leagues due to the restructuring of the Birmingham & District Premier League.

In 2020 there was no promotion from any of the four county feeder leagues due to the shortened season resulting from the COVID-19 pandemic.

From 2019 onwards the winners of the Worcestershire County League's new Premier Division went into a round-robin playoff at the end of the season with the winners of the Shropshire, South Staffordshire and Warwickshire leagues, with the top two sides out of the four being promoted to the Birmingham & District Premier League.

== Division 1/Premier Division Championships ==
- 3: Pershore (& shortened 2020 season), Stourbridge
- 2: Astwood Bank, Brockhampton, Kington, Redditch, Stourport, Worcester Nomads
- 1: Barnards Green, Bewdley, Eastnor, Evesham, Hagley, Old Elizabethans, Old Hill, Ombersley, Worcester

== Divisional structure ==
From 1999 until 2018 from Division 1 down to Division 4 there were separate 2nd XI Divisions, with the 4th XI of those sides whose 3rd XIs played in the league competing against other clubs' 2nd XIs. From 2006, Division 1 and 2 2nd XIs were promoted and relegated independently of their 1st XIs (and 4th XIs could be promoted or relegated independently of their 3rd XIs), from 2007 the same applied to Division 3, and from 2014 this also applied to Division 4. Clubs could only be promoted from Division 5 if they were able to field two XIs in the following season, and there was a space available in Division 4.

At the end of the 2018 season the league absorbed six 1st XIs that were relegated out of the Birmingham and District Premier League due to the league downsizing from 48 to 24 clubs, as well as 14 2nd XIs, due to the B&DPCL no longer holding a 2nd XI competition from 2019 onwards. The 1st XIs to be relegated were Astwood Bank, Old Elizabethans, Old Hill, Pershore, Redditch and Stourbridge. The 2nd XIs that were absorbed by the WCL were Astwood Bank, Barnards Green, Barnt Green, Brockhampton, Bromsgrove, Halesowen, Himley, Kidderminster, Old Elizabethans, Old Hill, Ombersley, Pershore, Redditch, and Stourbridge.

For the 2019 season the league adopted a 'linear structure' so that 1st, 2nd, 3rd, 4th, 5th and 6th XIs would all be part of the same 'ladder system', and theoretically a 2nd, 3rd or 4th XI etc. would be able to be promoted as far as the new WCL Premier Division (one division below the Birmingham and District Premier League).

For the 2021 season several of the league's lower divisions were regionalised, so that the top 8 divisions (Premier to Division 7) remained county wide, but Divisions 8 and 9 were regionalised into North, South, East and West divisions. For the 2022 season a county wide Division 8 was added, with three regional divisions in Division 9 and four regional divisions in the new Division 10. This was adjusted again for 2023, with Divisions 7 & 8 being regionalised into Division 7 North & South, and Division 8 being split into four regional divisions of North, South, East & West. At the bottom of the league, Division 9 has two divisions of North and South.

For the 2023 season the league took over the administration of the Marches Cricket League, with the winners (and potentially 2nd-placed team) in Marches League Division 1 being offered the chance to compete in the Division 8 playoffs. The rest of the Marches League Divisions would operate on a two-up, two down basis, apart from there being no relegation from Division 3. The Marches League was finally disbanded after the 2024 season and fully absorbed into the league for the 2025 season, with the league operating on a linear basis covering the whole of Worcestershire and Herefordshire from the Premier Division down to Division 6, then regionalising below that with Division 7 split into 3 divisions, and Divisions 8 & 9 each split into 4 divisions.

Further regionalisation took place in time for the 2026 season, from Division 5 downwards, with Divisions 5, 6 & 7 being split into North and South, Division 8 being split into 3 divisions, and Division 9 remaining with 4 different regional divisions, two divisions each covering North & South Worcestershire and North & South Herefordshire.

For 2026 the Worcestershire County Cricket League will be made up of the following divisions and clubs:

=== Premier Division ===
- Astwood Bank 1st XI
- Barnt Green 2nd XI
- Brockhampton 1st XI
- Bromsgrove 1st XI
- Lye 1st XI
- Netherton 1st XI
- Old Elizabethans 1st XI
- Ombersley 2nd XI
- Pershore 1st XI
- Redditch Entaco 1st XI
- Stourport-on-Severn 1st XI
- Worcester 1st XI

=== Division 1 ===
- Barnards Green 2nd XI
- Belbroughton 1st XI
- Bewdley 1st XI
- Burghill, Tillington & Weobley 1st XI
- Colwall 1st XI
- Coombs Wood 1st XI
- Droitwich Spa 1st XI
- Hagley 1st XI
- Halesowen 2nd XI
- Himley 2nd XI
- Pedmore 1st XI
- Worcester Nomads 1st XI

=== Division 2 ===
- Bartestree & Lugwardine 1st XI
- Bredon 1st XI
- Bromsgrove 2nd XI
- Bromyard 1st XI
- Chaddesley Corbett 1st XI
- Enville 1st XI
- Lye 2nd XI
- Netherton 2nd XI
- Old Elizabethans 2nd XI
- Oldswinford 1st XI
- Rushwick 1st XI
- Stourport-on-Severn 2nd XI

=== Division 3 ===
- Astwood Bank 2nd XI
- Avoncroft 1st XI
- Brockhampton 2nd XI
- Cookley 1st XI
- Feckenham 1st XI
- Five Ways Old Edwardians 1st XI
- Harborne 3rd XI
- Himbleton 1st XI
- Kidderminster 2nd XI
- Martley 1st XI
- Redditch Entaco 2nd XI
- Worcester 2nd XI

=== Division 4 ===
- Claverley 1st XI
- Cutnall Green 1st XI
- Droitwich Spa 2nd XI
- Eastnor 1st XI
- Hagley 2nd XI
- Halesowen 3rd XI
- Malvern 1st XI
- Old Hill 2nd XI
- Old Vigornians 1st XI
- Pershore 2nd XI
- Romsley & Hunnington 1st XI
- Worcester Nomads 2nd XI

=== Division 5 (North) ===
- Alveley 1st XI
- Astwood Bank 3rd XI
- Barnt Green 3rd XI
- Belbroughton 2nd XI
- Bewdley 2nd XI
- Cookhill 1st XI
- Coombs Wood 2nd XI
- Enville 2nd XI
- Harborne 4th XI
- Himley 3rd XI
- Pedmore 2nd XI
- Stourbridge 2nd XI

=== Division 5 (South) ===
- Bromyard 2nd XI
- Burghill, Tillington & Weobley 2nd XI
- Colwall 2nd XI
- Hanley Castle & Upton 1st XI
- Harvington 1st XI
- Himbleton 2nd XI
- Old Elizabethans 3rd XI
- Pershore 3rd XI
- Rushwick 2nd XI
- Tenbury Wells 1st XI
- West Malvern 1st XI
- Woolhope 1st XI

=== Division 6 (North) ===
- Alvechurch & Hopwood 1st XI
- Alveley 2nd XI
- Bromsgrove 3rd XI
- Chaddesley Corbett 2nd XI
- Halesowen 4th XI
- Harborne 5th XI
- Himley 4th XI
- Kidderminster 3rd XI
- Lye 3rd XI
- Netherton 3rd XI
- Romsley & Hunnington 2nd XI
- Stourbridge 3rd XI

=== Division 6 (South) ===
- Amigos Kempsey 1st XI
- Barnards Green 3rd XI
- Bartestree & Lugwardine 2nd XI
- Brockhampton 3rd XI
- Builth Wells 1st XI
- Droitwich Spa 3rd XI
- Garnons
- Ledbury 1st XI
- Old Vigornians 2nd XI
- Ombersley 3rd XI
- Stone 1st XI
- Wormelow 1st XI

=== Division 7 (North) ===
- Cookley 2nd XI
- Coombs Wood 3rd XI
- Enville 3rd XI
- Feckenham 2nd XI
- Harborne 6th XI
- Highley
- Inkberrow
- Old Halesonians
- Oldswinford 2nd XI
- Redditch Entaco 3rd XI
- Stourbridge 4th XI
- Stourport-on-Severn 3rd XI

=== Division 7 (South) ===
- Almeley 1st XI
- Birlingham
- Bredon 2nd XI
- Challengers Hereford 1st XI
- Fownhope Strollers 1st XI
- Kington 1st XI
- Luctonians 1st XI
- Malvern 2nd XI
- Old Elizabethans 4th XI
- Rushwick 3rd XI
- Worcester 3rd XI
- Worcester Nomads 3rd XI

=== Division 8 (North) ===
- Belbroughton 3rd XI
- Bewdley 3rd XI
- Droitwich Spa 5th XI
- Five Ways Old Edwardians 2nd XI
- Hagley 3rd XI
- Halesowen 5th XI
- Old Hill 3rd XI
- Oldswinford 3rd XI
- Pedmore 3rd XI
- Stone 2nd XI

=== Division 8 (Central) ===
- Amigos Kempsey 2nd XI
- Astwood Bank 4th XI
- Avoncroft 2nd XI
- Bosbury
- Cookhill 2nd XI
- Droitwich Spa 4th XI
- Feckenham 3rd XI
- Hallow Taverners
- Harvington 2nd XI
- Martley 2nd XI

=== Division 8 (South) ===
- Bartestree & Lugwardine 3rd XI
- Canon Frome
- Colwall 3rd XI
- Dales 1st XI
- Eastnor 2nd XI
- Hay-on-Wye
- Ledbury 2nd XI
- Moccas
- Presteigne
- Ross-on-Wye

=== Division 9 (Worcestershire North) ===
- Cookley 3rd XI
- Enville 4th XI
- Five Ways Old Edwardians 3rd XI
- Hagley 4th XI
- Himley 5th XI
- Netherton 4th XI
- Pedmore 4th XI
- Romsley & Hunnington 3rd XI

=== Division 9 (Worcestershire South) ===
- Avoncroft 3rd XI
- Barnards Green 4th XI
- Cutnall Green 2nd XI
- Hanley Castle & Upton 2nd XI
- Malvern 3rd XI
- Pershore 4th XI
- Rushwick 4th XI
- Worcester 4th XI

=== Division 9 (Herefordshire North) ===
- Almeley 2nd XI
- Bromyard 3rd XI
- Builth Wells 2nd XI
- Dales 2nd XI
- Kington 2nd XI
- Knighton-on-Teme
- Luctonians 2nd XI
- Tenbury Wells 2nd XI

=== Division 9 (Herefordshire South) ===
- Bartestree & Lugwardine 4th XI
- Brockhampton 4th XI
- Burghill, Tillington & Weobley 3rd XI
- Challengers Hereford 2nd XI
- Fownhope Strollers 2nd XI
- West Malvern 2nd XI
- Woolhope 2nd XI
- Wormelow 2nd XI

=== Clubs from different counties ===
For the 2026 season, 79 different clubs will have sides in the league (194 sides in total across the 18 divisions).

- 49 Worcestershire clubs (Alvechurch & Hopwood, Astwood Bank, Avoncroft, Barnards Green, Barnt Green, Belbroughton, Bewdley, Birlingham, Bredon, Bromsgrove, Chaddesley Corbett, Cookhill, Cookley, Coombs Wood, Cutnall Green, Droitwich Spa, Feckenham, Five Ways Old Edwardians, Hagley, Hallow Taverners, Halesowen, Hanley Castle & Upton, Harvington, Himbleton, Inkberrow, Kidderminster, Knighton on Teme, Lye, Malvern, Martley, Netherton, Old Elizabethans, Old Halesonians, Oldswinford, Old Vigornians, Ombersley, Pedmore, Pershore, Redditch Entaco, Romsley & Hunnington, Rushwick, Stone, Stourbridge, Stourport-on-Severn, Tenbury Wells, West Malvern, Worcester, Worcester Amigos, Worcester Nomads).
- 20 Herefordshire clubs (Almeley, Bartestree & Lugwardine, Bosbury, Brockhampton, Bromyard, Burghill, Tillington & Weobley, Canon Frome, Challengers Hereford, Colwall, Dales, Eastnor, Fownhope Strollers, Garnons, Kington, Ledbury, Luctonians, Moccas, Ross-on-Wye, Woolhope, Wormelow).
- 3 Shropshire clubs (Alveley, Claverley, Highley).
- 3 Staffordshire clubs (Enville, Himley, Old Hill).
- 3 Welsh clubs (Builth Wells, Hay-on-Wye, Presteigne).
- 1 Warwickshire club (Harborne).

== Famous players ==
101 First-Class, List A and T20 Male cricketers have played in the Worcestershire County Cricket League, including 22 Test or ODI players:

=== Internationals, and club represented ===
England

- Steve Davies Victoria & Blakeley Hall (later merged with Kidderminster to form Kidderminster Victoria CC from 2003 to 2015)
- Phil Newport Worcester Nomads
- Neal Radford Evesham
- Josh Tongue Bromyard

New Zealand

- Mark Craig Coombs Wood
- Daniel Flynn Barnards Green
- Jayden Lennox Harvington
- Cole McConchie Monmouth

West Indies

- Fabian Allen Worcester
- Andre Russell Barnards Green

Pakistan

- Humayun Farhat Stourbridge
- Imran Farhat Stourbridge
- Abdur Rauf Brockhampton

Sri Lanka

- Dinusha Fernando Bromyard
- Chamila Gamage also known as Chamila Gamage Lakshitha, Alvechurch & Hopwood
- Dharshana Gamage Kington

Zimbabwe

- Innocent Kaia Worcester Nomads
- Gus Mackay Barnt Green

Namibia

- Peter-Daniel Blignaut Bartestree & Lugwardine

Scotland

- James Brinkley Chaddesley Corbett, Belbroughton
- Oliver Davidson Stourbridge
- Navdeep Poonia Old Hill

=== Other First Class, List A and T20 players, and club(s) represented ===
England

- Steve Adshead Astwood Bank
- Josh Baker Astwood Bank
- Oliver Bailey Bromyard
- Christopher Boroughs Brockhampton, Himley
- Nic Buckle Old Elizabethans
- James Burgoyne Coombs Wood, Pedmore
- Duncan Catterall Ombersley
- Nigel Cowley Himbleton
- Ben Cox Belbroughton
- Henry Cullen Barnt Green
- Brett D'Oliveira Worcester Dominies & Guild
- Damian D'Oliveira Ombersley
- Rehaan Edavalath Barnards Green
- Nick Hammond Ombersley
- Mark Hardinges Malvern, Colwall
- Phil Harris Barnards Green
- Chris Harwood Colwall
- Zain-ul-Hassan Barnt Green, Stourbridge
- Gavin Haynes Ombersley
- Josh Haynes Worcester Nomads
- Richard Howitt Colwall
- Jake Hutson Burghill, Tillington & Weobley
- Richard Jones Old Hill
- Stuart Lampitt Rushwick
- Jayden Levitt Bromsgrove
- Alex Milton Bromsgrove, Worcester Nomads
- Ravi Nagra Old Hill
- Liam O'Driscoll Worcester Nomads
- Matthew Pardoe Belbroughton
- Harshad Patel Stourbridge
- Nitesh Patel Stourbridge
- Karl Pearson Luctonians, Bromyard, Tenbury Wells
- Matthew Rawnsley Ombersley
- George Rhodes Barnards Green, Rushwick
- Nathan Round Coombs Wood
- Ben Stebbings Kington
- Michael Strong Colwall
- Naqaash Tahir Old Hill, Netherton
- William Thomas Ombersley
- Steve Watkins Wormelow
- Gareth Williams Astwood Bank
- Gary Williams Bromyard
- Jonathan Wright Old Hill

Australia

- Michael Jeh Luctonians
- Craig Jones Kington
- Angus Robson Worcester Nomads

South Africa

- Andre (Leon) Botha Pershore
- Wesley Euley Droitwich Spa
- Calvin Flowers Ombersley
- Bonga Makaka Stourport
- Lundi Mbane Bromyard
- Dillon Stanley Worcester Nomads

West Indies

- Audley Alexander Stourbridge
- Sheeno Berridge Barnards Green
- Sergio Fedee Stourbridge
- Mali Richards Stourbridge

New Zealand

- Jonothon Boult Barnards Green, Bewdley, Droitwich Spa
- Stefan Hook-Sporry Burghill, Tillington & Weobley
- Barry Rhodes Bromyard

India

- Neeraj Chawla Coombs Wood
- Sachin Khartade Worcester Nomads
- Shashi Ranjan Alvechurch & Hopwood
- Gagandeep Singh Redditch
- Basil Thampi Worcester CC

Pakistan

- Ahmed Jamal Bromyard
- Atiq-ur-Rehman Eastnor
- Hamza Nadeem Stourbridge
- Khalid Mahmood Redditch
- Mahmood Malik Brockhampton
- Mohammad Ali Brockhampton
- Naeem Anjum Chaddesley Corbett
- Zahid Saeed Ombersley, Bromyard

Sri Lanka

- Hasitha de Silva Enville
- Saminda Fernando Bartestree & Lugwardine
- Lakshan Rodrigo Bromyard

Zimbabwe

- Clive Chadhani Worcester, Old Elizabethans, Burghill, Tillington & Weobley
- Leon Soma Droitwich Spa
- Jason Young Barnards Green

Namibia

- Xander Pitchers Worcester

=== Women Cricketers ===
Several List A Women Cricketers have also played in the WCL:

- Ellie Anderson Alveley
- Clare Boycott Astwood Bank
- Phoebe Brett Malvern
- Bryony Gillgrass Astwood Bank, Old Vigornians
- Hannah Hardwick Old Elizabethans, Pershore
- Charis Pavely Bromsgrove, Old Elizabethans
