= List of English and Welsh cricket league clubs =

This is a list of English and Welsh cricket leagues recognised and supported by the England and Wales Cricket Board as ECB Premier Leagues, and beneath the League titles are the cricket clubs that are in their top divisions in the 2023 English cricket season. These leagues and clubs are the top echelons of the amateur, recreational game of cricket in England and Wales.

There are also non-ECB-affiliated leagues such as the Lancashire League and the Central Lancashire League, as their standards of cricket also represent the highest standards in the English (and Welsh) non-first-class game.

== ECB Premier Leagues ==
League	Club
Birmingham and District Premier League	Barnt Green; Berkswell; Kenilworth Wardens; Kidderminster; Knowle and Dorridge; Ombersley; Moseley; Shrewsbury; Smethwick; Barnard Green; Wolverhampton; Halesowen
Bradford Premier League	Woodlands; New Farnley; Townville; Methley; Jer Lane; Ossett; Bradford & Bingley; Farsley; Pudsey St Lawrence; Pudsey Congs; Hanging Heaton; Bankfoot
Cheshire County Cricket League	Neston; Didsbury; Hyde; Alderley Edge; Nantwich; Widnes; Oxton; Cheadle; Chester Boughton Hall; Brooklands
Cornwall Cricket League	Penzance; St Austell; Wadebridge; Redruth; Helston; Camborne; St Just; Callington; Hayle; Werrington
Derbyshire County Cricket League	Swarkestone; Sandiacre Town; Ockbrook & Borrowash; Dunstall; Denby; Spondon; Alrewas; Alvaston & Boulton; Rolleston; Eckington; Cutthorpe; Ticknall
Devon Cricket League	Cornwood; Bovey Tracey; Heathcoat; Sandford; Sidmouth; Exmouth; Bradninch & Kentisbeare; Paignton; Plympton; North Devon
East Anglian Premier Cricket League	Mildenhall; Sawston and Babraham; Copdock & Old Ipswichian; Swardeston; Saffron Walden; Bury St Edmunds; Great Witchingham; Witham; Horsford; Sudbury; Frinton On Sea; Wisbech Town
Essex Premier League	Ardleigh Green; Brentwood; Chingford; Colchester and East Essex; Gidea Park and Romford; Hainault and Clayhall; South Woodford; Upminster; Ilford; Wanstead; Bardoli Cricket Club
Hertfordshire Cricket League	Bishop's Stortford; Harpenden; Hertford North Mym Old Owens ms Potters Bar; Radlett Shenley Village; Totteridge Millhillians West Herts
Home Counties Premier Cricket League	Aston Rowant; Banbury; Dinton; Falkland; Finchampstead; Henley; High Wycombe; Oxford; Radlett; Reading; Slough; Tring Park; Welwyn Garden City
Kent Cricket League	Beckenham and Sydenham; Blackheath; Bromley; Gore Court; Hartley Country Club; Lordswood; Rainham; St Lawrence and Highland Court; Sandwich Town; Sevenoaks Vine; Tunbridge Wells
Leicestershire Premier Cricket League	Ashby Hastings; Earl Shilton Town; Hinckley Town; Illston Abey; Kibworth; Leicester Banks; Leicester Ivanhoe; Loughborough Town; Lutterworth; Market Harborough; Stoughton and Thurnby; Syston Town
Lincolnshire Cricket Board Premier League	Bourne; Bracebridge Heath; Caistor; Grimsby Town; Haxey; Lindum; Louth; Market Deeping; Messingham; Nettleham; Sleaford; Woodhall Spa
Liverpool and District Cricket Competition	Birkenhead Park; Bootle; Formby; Hightown St. Mary's; Highfield; Leigh; Lytham; New Brighton; Northern; Ormskirk; Rainhill; Southport & Birkdale; Wallasey
Middlesex Premier League	Brondesbury; Crouch End; Ealing; Finchley; Hampstead; North Middlesex; Richmond; Shepherds Bush; Teddington; Twickenham
Northamptonshire Cricket League	Burton Latimer; Desborough; Finedon Dolben; Irthlingborough Town; Northampton Saints; Northants CCC Academy; Old Northamptonians; Peterborough Town; Rushden Town; Rushton; Stony Stratford; Wollaston
North East Premier League	Benwell Hill; Blaydon; Chester le Street; Durham Cricket Board; Gateshead Fell; Newcastle; Norton; South Northumberland; South Shields; Stockton; Sunderland; Tynemouth
North Staffordshire and South Cheshire League	Audley; Barlaston; Burslem; Knypersley; Leek; Little Stoke; Longton; Moddershall; Porthill Park; Stafford; Stone; Wood Lane
North Yorkshire and South Durham Cricket League	Barnard Castle; Bishop Auckland; Darlington; Great Ayton; Hartlepool; Marske; Marton; Middlesbrough; Richmondshire; Seaton Carew; Stokesley; Thornaby
North Wales Premier Cricket League	Bangor; Bethesda; Brymbo; Connah's Quay; Hawarden Park; Llandudno; Llanrwst; Menai Bridge; Mochdre; Mold; Pontblyddyn; St Asaph
Northern Premier Cricket League	Barrow; Blackpool; Carnforth; Chorley; Darwen; Fleetwood; Kendal; Lancaster; Leyland; Morecambe; Netherfield; Preston; St Annes
Nottinghamshire Cricket Board Premier League	Caythorpe; Clifton Village; Cuckney; Gedling Colliery; Killamarsh; Kimberley Institute; Mansfield Hosiery Mills; Papplewick and Linby; Plumtree; Welbeck Colliery; West Indian Cavaliers; Wollaton
South Wales Premier Cricket League	Bridgend Town; Cardiff; Croesyceiliog; Newport; Panteg; Penarth; Pentyrch; St Fagans; Sudbrook; Sully Centurions; Tondu; Usk
Southern Premier Cricket League	Alton; Bashley Rydal; Burridge; Calmore Sports; Hampshire Academy; Havant; Lymington; New Milton; South Wilts; St Cross Symondians
Surrey Championship	Avorians; Dulwich; Guildford; Malden Wanderers; Normandy; Reigate Priory; Spencer; Sunbury; Sutton; Wimbledon
Sussex Cricket League	Brighton and Hove; Chichester Priory Park; Bexhill; East Grinstead; Eastbourne; Hastings and St Leonards Priory; Horsham; Preston Nomads; Roffey; Sussex CCC Development XI; Three Bridges
West of England Premier League	Bath; Bedminster; Bridgwater; Bristol; Clevedon; Downend; Frocester; Goatacre; Potterne; Taunton St Andrews
Yorkshire Premier League North	Acomb; Castleford; Clifton Alliance; Driffield Town; Harrogate; Scarborough; Sessay; Sheriff Hutton Bridge; Stamford Bridge; Woodhouse Grange; York; Yorkshire CCC Academy
Yorkshire South Premier League	Appleby Frodingham; Aston Hall; Barnsley Woolley Miners; Cleethorpes; Doncaster Town; Hallam; Sheffield Collegiate; Treeton; Wakefield Thornes; Whiston Parish Church; Whitley Hall; Wickersley Old Village

== Independent leagues ==
=== Central Lancashire Cricket League ===
Ashton | Clifton | Crompton | Heywood | Littleborough | Middleton | Milnrow | Monton & Weaste | Norden | Oldham | Radcliffe | Rochdale | Royton | Unsworth | Walsden | Werneth

=== Lancashire League ===
Accrington | Bacup | Burnley | Church | Colne | East Lancashire | Enfield | Haslingden | Lowerhouse | Nelson | Ramsbottom | Rawtenstall | Rishton | Todmorden

=== Yorkshire and Derbyshire League ===
52 teams.

== See also ==
- Club cricket
- List of cricket clubs in Australia
- ECB National Club Cricket Championship
- ECB National Club Twenty20
