= Paul Pridgeon =

English cricketer

Paul Pridegon
Personal information
- Full name: Alan Paul Pridegon
- Born: 22 February 1954 (age 72); Wall Heath, Kingswinford, Staffordshire
- Batting: Right-handed
- Bowling: Right-arm medium

Domestic team information
- Years: Team
- 1972–1989: Worcestershire
- 1991: Shropshire

Career statistics
| Competition | First-class | List A |
|---|---|---|
| Matches | 240 | 229 |
| Runs scored | 1,188 | 273 |
| Batting average | 8.67 | 7.80 |
| 100s/50s | 0/1 | 0/0 |
| Top score | 67 | 17 |
| Balls bowled | 36,099 | 10,372 |
| Wickets | 530 | 219 |
| Bowling average | 32.76 | 32.65 |
| 5 wickets in innings | 10 | 1 |
| 10 wickets in match | 1 | 0 |
| Best bowling | 7/35 | 6/26 |
| Catches/stumpings | 82/– | 40/– |
- Source: CricketArchive, 22 November 2008

Alan Paul Pridgeon (born 22 February 1954) is a former English cricketer who played first-class and List A cricket for Worcestershire County Cricket Club, taking 530 first-class and 273 List A wickets for the county between the early 1970s and the late 1980s. He was capped by the county in 1980. He played football in the winters as a centre-half for Stourbridge F.C.

== Career ==
Born at Wall Heath, Kingswinford, Staffordshire, he was educated at Summerhill Secondary Modern School.

After playing club cricket first for Himley, then in the Birmingham League for Stourbridge, he was offered a trial by Worcestershire. He made his first-class debut against Cambridge University at Fenner's in May 1972, though he had an unsuccessful match, taking no wickets and not batting in either innings. He had to wait until the middle of July to play again, bowling Barry Dudleston of Leicestershire to claim the first wicket of his career.

Pridgeon was given only occasional opportunities for the next three seasons, but in 1976 things turned his way: Brian Brain and Keith Wilkinson left the club, while Jim Cumbes spent the summer in the United States playing football. Pridgeon was rarely out of the first team during that famously hot summer. Indeed, his 1,200 deliveries in List A cricket were the most he sent down in any one season. In late May he claimed what was to remain his career-best bowling return in taking 7/35 against Oxford University, three further successes in the second innings bringing him his only ten-wicket match haul.

He dropped out of the side after the first half of 1977, but returned to play a full part in the 1978 season. In late July of that year, he achieved his best bowling performance in a one-day match, taking 6/26 against Surrey in the John Player League. At the time, this was the second-best return for Worcestershire in a List A game (behind Jack Flavell's 6/14 against Lancashire in 1963). However, in 1979 he was once again mainly a Second XI player.

From 1980, when he was capped, until 1984 Pridgeon commanded a regular place in the Worcestershire side. In 1983 he took 72 first-class wickets, the most he would manage in a single summer; he also topped 50 in 1978, 1980, 1981, 1984 and 1986. In 1984 he made his one half-century, hitting 67 against Warwickshire. However in 1985 his fortunes took a dramatic turn for the worse. Neal Radford had arrived from Lancashire, and he and Phil Newport were ahead of Pridgeon in the pecking order; he ended up playing just one first-class match (and that against Cambridge University) and no List A games at all.

Pridgeon bounced back in 1986 to play a full part in the season, but although he took a County Championship best of 7/44 against Leicestershire in 1987, his appearances gradually diminished as his career began to wind down. He did, however, take part in the county's Championship-winning seasons of 1988 and 1989, and in 1988 he took 30 List A wickets, his most of any year. In 1989, his final season of first-class cricket, he was awarded a benefit season in the latter year, which raised £154,720.

On leaving Worcestershire, Pridgeon took up a coaching role at Shrewsbury School. However, he continued to play cricket, turning out for Shropshire in 1991 and 1992 while playing at club level for Wroxeter. In June 1991 he made his sole List A appearance for them, playing (though taking no wickets) against Leicestershire in the NatWest Trophy.
