= List of Worcestershire Cricket Board List A players =

Worcestershire Cricket Board played in List A cricket matches between 1999 and 2003. This is a list of the players who appeared in those matches.

- Kabir Ali (2000–2001): Kabir Ali
- Kadeer Ali (1999–20020: Kadeer Ali
- David Banks (2000–2001): DA Banks
- Michael Barfoot (1999): MR Barfoot
- Andrew Bryan (2001): AP Bryan
- James Burgoyne (1999): J Burgoyne
- Simon Cook (2002): SH Cook
- Mark Dale (2001–2002): MAP Dale
- Steven Davies (2002–2003): SM Davies
- Scott Ellis (2001): SWK Ellis
- Alan Gough (2001): AJ Gough
- Abdul Hafeez (2001–2003): A Hafeez
- Jamil Hassan (2002): SJ Hassan
- Claude Henderson (2000–2001): CW Henderson
- Greg Hill (2000–2003): GR Hill
- Mark Hodgkiss (2001): MA Hodgkiss
- Christopher Howell (1999–2002): CR Howell
- Richard Illingworth (2002): RK Illingworth
- Imran Jamshed (2002–2003): I Jamshed
- Gurdeep Kandola (2001–2003): GS Kandola
- Justin Kemp (2003): JM Kemp
- Stuart Lampitt (2003): SR Lampitt
- David Manning (1999–2003): D Manning
- Tom Mees (1999): T Mees
- James Meyer (2000): JD Meyer
- David Middleton (2001): DB Middleton
- Depesh Patel (1999): DB Patel
- Kishor Patel (2001): K Patel
- Christopher Pearce (2003): CJ Pearce
- James Pipe (2000–2001): DJ Pipe
- Michael Rindel (2001): MJR Rindel
- Jason Robinson (1999): JM Robinson
- Nathan Round (1999–2003): NW Round
- Mark Scott (1999): MS Scott
- James Tandy (2000–2001): JM Tandy
- Kosie Venter (1999): JF Venter
- Alan Warner (2000): AE Warner
- Gary Williams (2000): GD Williams
- Gareth Williams (2001–2003): GJ Williams
- Jonathan Wright (1999–2001): JP Wright
