= David Banks (cricketer, born 1961) =

English cricketer

Personal information
- Full name: David Andrew Banks
- Born: 11 January 1961 (age 65); Pensnett, Dudley, England
- Batting: Right-handed
- Bowling: Right-arm medium
- Website: www.stac-cricket.com

Domestic team information
- Years: Team
- 2000–2001: Worcestershire Cricket Board
- 1986–1994: Staffordshire
- 1988–1989: Warwickshire
- 1982–1985: Worcestershire

Career statistics
Competition	FC	LA
Matches	30	30
Runs scored	1,034	374
Batting average	27.21	17.00
100s/50s	1/5	0/2
Top score	100	62*
Balls bowled	60	108
Wickets	0	4
Bowling average	–	23.75
5 wickets in innings	0	0
10 wickets in match	0	N/A
Best bowling	–	2/46
Catches/stumpings	15/0	0/0
- Source: CricketArchive, 24 November 2008

David Andrew Banks (born 11 January 1961) is a former English cricketer who played first-class and List A cricket for Worcestershire and Warwickshire. He also played minor counties cricket (and a few List A games) for Staffordshire and for the Worcestershire Cricket Board team.

He made his Worcestershire debut in mid-August 1982 in a John Player League match against Hampshire at Southampton, holding a catch to dismiss Hampshire captain Nick Pocock. Banks did not bat, owing to a first-wicket partnership of 224 between Alan Ormrod (92*) and Dipak Patel (125) which as of 2008 remained a record opening stand for Worcestershire in List A cricket. That proved to be his only first-team appearance of the season.

In 1983 Banks hit a century on his first-class debut, though it was to remain the only one he ever made. He scored 100 and 53 against Oxford University in June, which led to his being given a run in the team during the middle part of the summer, but he was unable to repeat this success and scored only 210 more runs in 11 first-class innings. He fared no better in the one-day game, managing just 35 runs in six innings.

Banks remained at Worcestershire for a couple more years, but scored only two more half-centuries (both in first-class games) and when 1986 came around he was playing in the Minor Counties Championship for Staffordshire. Although more of his matches were minor, the NatWest Trophy afforded him the chance of List A games occasionally. In June 1988 Staffordshire played Surrey at Burton upon Trent, and although they lost the game they put in a creditable performance thanks largely to Banks. He scored 62*, his only List A half-century, and took the wickets of Alec Stewart and Monte Lynch. Banks' all-round performance won him the man-of-the-match award

Banks returned to the first-class game, with Warwickshire, halfway through the 1988 season, and he remained at Edgbaston in 1989 as well. He scored one first-class half-century in each season, but did not produce consistent scores and was relegated to the Second XI by the middle of June 1989. For 1990 he was back with Staffordshire, for whom he continued to play until the mid-nineties. His final List A game was for the recreational Worcestershire Cricket Board against Buckinghamshire in the C&G Trophy in late August 2001.

He had some significant appearances in club cricket. In 1986 he was part of the Stourbridge side which beat Weston-super-Mare to lift the William Younger Cup, while he later turned out for Old Hill, in 1993 playing as they beat West Bromwich Dartmouth to win the National Club Championship.

As of November 2012, David was appointed club coach of Halesowen Cricket Club with responsibility for overseeing youth cricket development as well as senior sides coaching.

David Banks is also renowned for making hand made custom cricket bats.
