= Harry Moule =

English cricketer

Personal information
- Born: 23 December 1921; Kidderminster, Worcestershire, England
- Died: 15 June 2016 (aged 94); Barnstaple, Devon, England
- Batting: Right-handed

Career statistics
Competition	First-class
Matches	1
Runs scored	102
Batting average	51.00
100s/50s	0/1
Top score	57
Balls bowled	0
Wickets	-
Bowling average	-
5 wickets in innings	-
10 wickets in match	-
Best bowling	-
Catches/stumpings	0/0
- Source: Cricinfo

Harry George Moule (23 December 1921 – 15 June 2016) was an English first-class cricketer who played a single first-class match, for Worcestershire against Cambridge University in 1952. He opened the batting with Norman Whiting and scored 45 and 57, playing "many attractive strokes" but nevertheless he never played for Worcestershire again. He had a long career in club and league cricket, especially with Kidderminster Cricket Club and Old Hill Cricket Club and once captained a Birmingham and District Premier League representative team.
