= Shashi Ranjan =

Shashi Ranjan may refer to:

- Shashi Ranjan (cricketer), Indian cricketer
- Shashi Ranjan Kumar, Indian civil servant
