= Bromsgrove Cricket Club =

Amateur cricket club based in Worcestershire, England

Bromsgrove Cricket Club is an amateur cricket club based in Worcestershire. Founded in 1842, the club now play in the Birmingham and District Premier League. The 3XI and 4XI play in the Worcestershire county cricket league. The club has close links with Worcestershire County Cricket Club. County players who have played for Bromsgrove include Stephen Peters, Nadeem Malik and Kadeer Ali. The most high-profile player is Alexei Kervezee who plays international cricket for Netherlands. Former Indian Test cricketer Sairaj Bahutule also played for Bromsgrove in 1992. Other famous people but less noted for their cricket include English professional footballer Kevin Poole, poet A. E. Housman and deputy controller of BBC Radio 1; Ben Cooper.
