= OHCC =

OHCC may refer to:

- Oakland Hills Country Club
- Old Hill Cricket Club
