= Birmingham League =

Birmingham League may mean:

- Birmingham and District Premier League, a cricket competition
- West Midlands (Regional) League, an association football competition previously known as the Birmingham and District League
- Birmingham and District Invitation Cross Country League, a cross-country running competition
