= Andrew Bryan =

Andrew Bryan may refer to:

- Andrew Bryan (Baptist) (1737–1812), founded the First African Baptist Church of Savannah in Savannah, Georgia
- Sir Andrew Bryan (engineer) (1893–1988), Scottish mining engineer
- Andrew Bryan (cricketer) (born 1964), former English cricketer
- Andrew J. Bryan (1848–1921), American architect

== See also ==
- Andrew Bryant (disambiguation)
