= Chester Road North Ground, Kidderminster =

Cricket ground in Worcestershire, England

Coordinates: 52°23′20″N 2°13′54″W

Chester Road North Ground
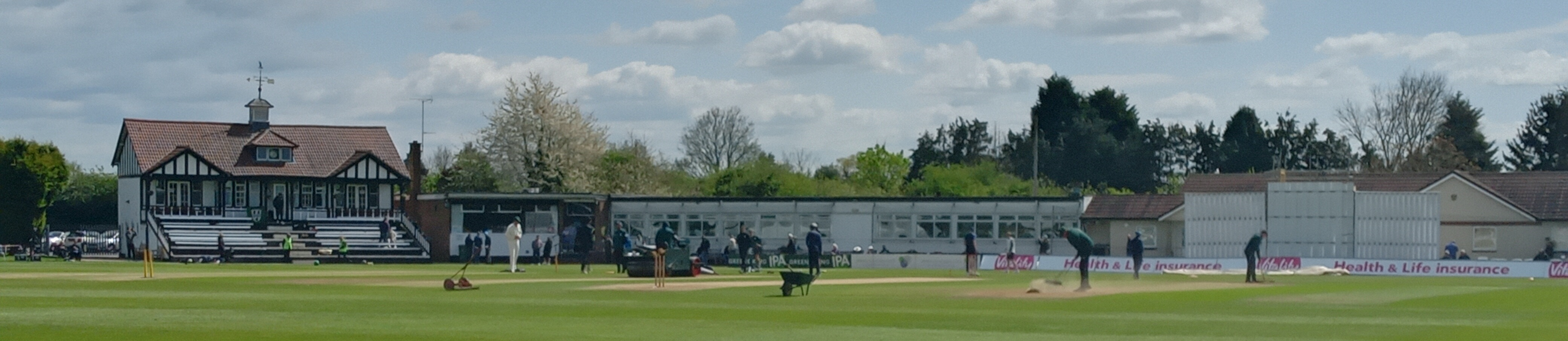
- The pavilion at the Chester Road North Ground
- Interactive map of Chester Road North Ground

Ground information
- Location: Kidderminster, Worcestershire, England
- Home club: Kidderminster Cricket Club
- County club: Worcestershire
- Capacity: 2000
- End names
- Railway End; Pavilion End

International information
- Only women's ODI: 19 August 2005: England v Australia
- As of 21 August 2020; Source: Cricinfo

The Chester Road North Ground, often referred to simply as Chester Road or Kidderminster, is a cricket ground in Kidderminster, Worcestershire, England. It is the home of Kidderminster Cricket Club, and is currently used for Worcestershire County Cricket Club's Second XI matches. It was opened in 1870.

== International cricket ==
Kidderminster hosted international cricket in 2005 when the second Women's One-day International between England and Australia was played here. The Australians won by 65 runs thanks largely to 7-24 from Shelley Nitschke, who became the first Australian woman to take more than five wickets in an ODI.

== First-class and List A cricket ==
Worcestershire played one County Championship match at Kidderminster every season from 1921 until 1973, and again each year from 1987 to 2002. Chester Road was then relegated to a Second-XI ground, and the only first-class game at Kidderminster for several years was Worcestershire's 2005 game against Loughborough UCCE, which the university side won by eight wickets. In 2007, with New Road badly affected by flooding, Kidderminster hosted two Championship games, while in 2008 Loughborough UCCE again visited. First-class cricket returned to Kidderminster in June 2019 when Worcestershire transferred their game against Sussex to the ground because of the threat of flooding at New Road. Worcestershire's first two home matches in the 2024 County Championship were played at Kidderminster in April 2024 because of flooding at New Road.

In List A cricket, one Player's County League game was held here in 1969, and a further six List A matches — three involving the Worcestershire team proper and three more contested by the recreational Worcestershire Cricket Board team — were hosted between 2000 and 2002. A further Pro40 game was played there in 2007, as were two Twenty20 matches. In 2010, the ground hosted the Unicorns team in the Pro40 competition.

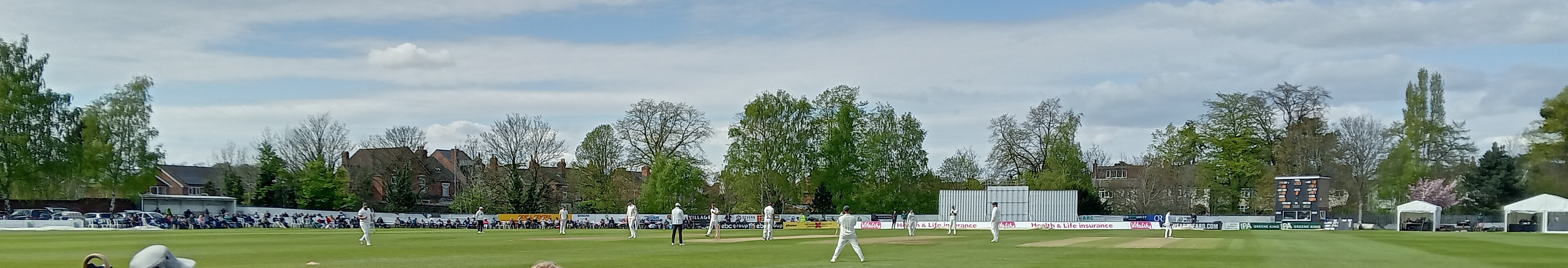
Wide view of the ground, looking toward the Railway End in 2024

== Records ==
=== First-class ===
- Highest team total: 560 by Worcestershire v Derbyshire, 1993
- Lowest team total: 63 by Worcestershire v Northamptonshire, 1963
- Highest individual innings: 259 by Don Kenyon for Worcestershire v Yorkshire, 1956
- Best bowling in an innings: 9-56 by Jack Flavell for Worcestershire v Middlesex, 1964

=== List A ===
- Highest team total: 281/7 (40 overs) by Worcestershire v Northamptonshire, 2007
- Lowest team total: 56 (27.1 overs) by Middlesex v Worcestershire, 1969
- Highest individual innings: 100 by Moeen Ali for Worcestershire v Northamptonshire, 2007
- Best bowling in an innings: 5-36 by Imran Jamshed for Worcestershire Cricket Board v Dorset, 2002
