= Andrew Bryant =

Andrew Bryant may refer to:

- Andrew Jackson Bryant (1823–1882), mayor of San Francisco, California
- Andrew S. Bryant (1841–1931), American Civil War soldier

== See also ==
- Andrew Bryan (disambiguation)
