= Keith Wilkinson (cricketer) =

English cricketer (1950–2023)

Personal information
- Full name: Keith William Wilkinson
- Born: 15 January 1950; Fenton, Stoke-on-Trent, Staffordshire, England
- Died: 21 February 2023 (aged 73)
- Batting: Left-handed
- Bowling: Left arm medium

Domestic team information
- Years: Team
- 1969–1975: Worcestershire

Career statistics
Competition	FC	LA
Matches	49	37
Runs scored	1,657	376
Batting average	25.10	15.66
100s/50s	2/6	0/2
Top score	141	95
Balls bowled	3,199	492
Wickets	48	8
Bowling average	34.39	44.12
5 wickets in innings	1	0
10 wickets in match	0	N/A
Best bowling	5/60	3/20
Catches/stumpings	29/–	12/–
- Source: CricketArchive, 13 October 2008

Keith William Wilkinson (15 January 1950 – 21 February 2023) was an English first-class cricketer who played for Worcestershire between 1969 and 1975.

After several years in the county's Second XI, Wilkinson made his first-class debut for Worcestershire against Somerset at Weston-super-Mare in early August 1969, scoring 1 in his only innings and holding three catches. He also played against Gloucestershire at Cheltenham a few days later, but again did little, scoring 3 not out and 1 in an innings defeat.

Wilkinson then returned to the seconds, and it was to be 1971 before he made any further first-team appearances. That summer he played in ten first-class and four List A games. His batting was unremarkable, and he did not reach 50 in any of these innings. However, he did manage what proved to be his only five-wicket innings haul in first-class cricket when he claimed 5–60 against Sussex at Worcester in late August. He finished with 24 first-class wickets that season, his best aggregate.

In 1972 he took 22 wickets, but after that his bowling was less to the fore. He was in and out of the side between 1972 and 1974, though he did make the occasional large score. In the first-class game, he made the first and larger of his two centuries, this being the 141 he hit against Oxford University, following it up with 80 in the second innings. He also made his highest List A score of 95 in this period, this innings coming in July 1974 in a Gillette Cup quarter-final against Nottinghamshire.

1975 proved to be Wilkinson's last year of county cricket, but it was also the season in which he had the most cricket, turning out for 16 first-class and 13 List A games. The statistical highlight of his summer was the second and final first-class century, 102 (albeit in an ultimately losing cause) against Kent in June. His 697 first-class runs in the season were by far a personal best; he had never previously reached 300. Wilkinson's last first-team game was a John Player League match against Somerset at Taunton on 14 September 1975: he scored 0* and held one catch, to dismiss Ian Botham.

After leaving the first-class game, Wilkinson continued to play minor cricket, and was part of the highly successful Old Hill Cricket Club side of the mid-1980s, playing in victorious William Younger Cup and Cockspur Cup finals in 1984, 1985 and 1987. In the first of these games, he hit 76* to guide Old Hill to a five-wicket victory after they had fallen to 55/4 in pursuit of 194 to win. Whilst playing for Old Hill Cricket Club he also scored a 162 not out which was a Birmingham League record for a number of years. Wilkinson then captained Kidderminster Cricket Club until 1998. He was president of the Birmingham League in 2011.
