= Gurdeep =

Gurdeep is an Indian given name, used by both sexes and predominantly by those who follow the religion of Sikhism. Notable people with the name include:

- Gurdeep Kohli, Indian television actress
- Gurdeep Samra, British Asian music producer and DJ
- Gurdeep Kandola, English cricketer
- Gurdeep "Deep" Roy, Anglo-Indian actor
- Gurdeep Pandher, Sikh-Canadian, Yukon-based author, teacher and performer, who makes Punjabi dance videos.
