= Jamie Spires =

English cricketer

Personal information
- Full name: James Ashley Stuart Spires
- Born: 12 November 1979 (age 47); Solihull, Warwickshire, England
- Batting: Right-handed
- Bowling: Slow left-arm

Domestic team information
- Years: Team
- 1999-2005: Warwickshire
- 2001: Warwickshire Cricket Board

Career statistics
Competition	FC	LA
Matches	7	1
Runs scored	70	–
Batting average	17.50	–
100s/50s	–/–	–/–
Top score	37*	–
Balls bowled	1,330	60
Wickets	20	1
Bowling average	38.40	33.00
5 wickets in innings	1	–
10 wickets in match	–	–
Best bowling	5/165	1/33
Catches/stumpings	3/–	–/–
- Source: Cricinfo, 25 October 2010

James 'Jamie' Ashley Stuart Spires (born 12 November 1976) is an English cricketer. Spires is a right-handed batsman who bowls slow left-arm orthodox. He was born in Solihull, Warwickshire and educated at Solihull School.

Spires made his debut in first-class cricket for Warwickshire against Middlesex in 2001. From 2001 to 2002, he represented the county in 7 first-class matches, the last of which came against Sussex in the County Championship. In his 7 first-class matches, he scored 70 runs at a batting average of 17.50, with a high score of 37*. In the field he took 3 catches. With the ball he took 20 wickets at a bowling average of 38.40, with a single five wicket haul which yielded his career best figures of 5/165.

In 2001, he represented the Warwickshire Cricket Board in a single List A match against Cumberland in the 1st round of the 2002 Cheltenham & Gloucester Trophy which was held in 2001 at St George's Road, Millom. In his only List A match he took a single wicket at a cost of 33 runs.

He currently plays (and captained until December 2012) club cricket for Knowle and Dorridge Cricket Club in the Birmingham and District Premier League, guiding them to their first ever Birmingham League title in 2009.
