= Stuart Lampitt =

English cricketer (born 1966)

Personal information
- Full name: Stuart Richard Lampitt
- Born: 29 July 1966 (age 60); Wolverhampton, Staffordshire, England
- Batting: Right-handed
- Bowling: Right-arm medium
- Role: All-rounder

Domestic team information
- Years: Team
- 1985–2002: Worcestershire

Career statistics
Competition	First-class	List A
Matches	236	302
Runs scored	5,649	2,106
Batting average	23.83	18.47
100s/50s	1/20	–/1
Top score	122	54
Balls bowled	32,050	12,456
Wickets	601	370
Bowling average	28.65	24.70
5 wickets in innings	20	3
10 wickets in match	–	–
Best bowling	7/45	6/26
Catches/stumpings	148/–	88/–
- Source: CricketArchive, 14 November 2024

Stuart Richard Lampitt (born 29 July 1966, in Wolverhampton) is a former English cricketer. He was a right-handed batsman and a right-arm medium-pace bowler. He played for Worcestershire from 1985 to 2002. During his career he was victorious in the 1986 final of the William Younger Cup, and the final of the NatWest Trophy in 1994. He also played in the Worcestershire side which won the County Championship in 1989, appearing especially in the second half of the season. Lampitt also helped his team to the semi-finals of the Benson and Hedges Cup of 1995. He took 370 List A wickets in all for Worcestershire, a record for the county.

He appeared eleventh on the national first-class bowling averages for 1994, one of his best seasons, taking 64 wickets at 23.18.

Lampitt played his last first-class matches in 2001, but continued for another season as a one-day specialist. He made one final List A appearance in 2003, for the recreational Worcestershire Cricket Board team against the professional Worcestershire side in the C&G Trophy, but had little success, bowling ten wicketless overs for 67 and scoring 26 not out.

After retiring Lampitt took up a full-time position as Cricket Development Officer for the Worcestershire Cricket Board and played one List A match for the board in 2003.

In November 2017 he became the administrator of the Worcestershire County Cricket League, the biggest cricket league in Worcestershire and a feeder to the Birmingham and District Premier League.
