= Lichfield Cricket Club =

== Lichfield Cricket Club ==
Lichfield Cricket Club's first team play cricket and currently play in the Staffordshire Club Cricket Championship, - Premier Division 2015. The club has the nickname 'Three Spires', derived from the three nearby spires of Lichfield Cathedral. They have 4 senior men's teams, junior teams at every age group level, from Under 9s to under 17s.

The club has a flourishing junior section and plays at its home ground Collins Hill, Eastern Road in Lichfield. The club is affiliated to the Burton & District Cricket League, Birmingham & District Premier Cricket League and the Staffordshire Cricket Board. The club has enjoyed great success in the last three years especially in the Sunday League.

== The Chauntry Cup ==
Lichfield Cricket Club hosts The Chauntry Cup, a contest for both amateur and professional cricketers, which has been running since 1936. Australian test cricketer Keith Miller, considered to be one of the best Australian all rounders, played for RAF in 1943. After playing an "unofficial" war time Test match at Lord's, he raced back to Lichfield and played in the finals the next day. The bowler Ray Lindwall played for the OTU (Officers Training Unit).

The Chauntry Cup claims to be the world's oldest, annually contested T20 cricket competition still running. On 5 May 2015, Sky Sports 2 recorded a piece which was aired 14 May 2015, about the Chauntry Cup. The recording was filmed at Lichfield CC.
