= Smethwick Cricket Club =

Amateur Cricket Club in Smethwick, Sandwell, England

- League: Birmingham & District Premier Cricket League

Team information
- Founded: 1835
- Home ground: Broomfield

History
- Premier Division wins: 3
- Official website: Smethwick Cricket Club

Smethwick Cricket Club, founded in 1835, is an amateur cricket club based in Smethwick, Sandwell, England. In 1891, Smethwick Cricket Club joined the Birmingham and District Cricket League. Smethwick have five Senior XI teams: The 1st XI play in the Birmingham & District Premier League Premier Division, and the 2nd, 3rd and 4th XI compete in the Warwickshire County Cricket League. Smethwick CC also have a Sunday XI that play in the Arden Sunday Cricket League, and an established junior section that plays competitive cricket in the Warwickshire Youth Cricket Leagues. Smethwick have been Birmingham and District Premier League Champions on 5 occasions in 1951, 1968, 2022, 2024 and 2025

== International players ==
International players who have played for the club include: Azhar Mahmood, Mohammad Akram, Mohammad Yousuf, Wasim Akram, Kabir Ali, Mike Rindel and Steve Waugh.

== See also ==
- Club cricket
