= Barnt Green Cricket Club =

The Barnt Green Cricket Club is an amateur cricket club in Barnt Green, near Bromsgrove in North Worcestershire. The club owns two grounds close to each another and both have artificial and grass practice areas. The 1st XI and 2nd XIs currently play in the Worcestershire County Cricket League and Birmingham and District Premier League. The 3rd and 4th XIs play in the Worcestershire County Cricket League. They were the last club to be invited into the Old Birmingham League set-up before the pyramid system was introduced, replacing Mitchells and Butlers Cricket Club, and won the Division 1 title in their first season, in 1995. They also won the Division 1 title in 1997, and the Premier Division title (after the introduction of the pyramid system in 1999) in 2005 and 2011. They were runners-up in the ECB National Club Cricket Championship in 2002 and 2005.

They play their home games at Cherry Hill Road, Barnt Green, which is also used by Worcestershire County Cricket Club 2nd XI. Former internationals who have played for the club include Grant Flower, Richard Illingworth, Dougie Brown and Gus Mackay.

In 2016 the boys U15 team appeared in the ECB National Club championships final. They were successful in beating St Cross Symondians CC by 107 runs to clinch the trophy for the first time in the club's history.
