= Walsall Cricket Club =

Amateur cricket club in the West Midlands, UK

- League: Staffordshire Cricket League

Team information
- Founded: 1833
- Home ground: Gorway Ground, Highgate, Walsall
- Official website: Official website

Walsall Cricket Club is an amateur cricket club in Walsall, West Midlands.

Established in 1833, it originally trained and played games in the Chuckery area of Walsall. It then moved to one at Windmill in 1847 and remained there until around 1850. The Chuckery ground became used by another team called the Tradesmen's Cricket Club. The Walsall Cricket Club stopped playing between 1850 and 1851, and reformed in 1852 when it moved back to the ground at the Chuckery. It remained there until 1909 when a new ground was opened at Gorway. The club still occupied it until 1974.

Their first and second XIs currently play in the Premier Division of the Birmingham and District Premier League, of which they are a founding member. They are also one of the most prominent cricket clubs in the country, winning the national club knockout cup in 1996, and being runners-up in 1991. They play their home games at Gorway Ground, Highgate, Walsall, a ground which was often used by Staffordshire County Cricket Club for Minor Counties Championship fixtures.

Walsall won the Birmingham League for the first time in seven years in 2006. They won the league again in 2012. In 2022 Walsall suffered relegation from Birmingham League 2 and will spend their first season outside the Birmingham League in the Staffordshire Cricket League.
