= Coventry and North Warwickshire Sports Club =

English amateur sports club

The Coventry and North Warwickshire Sports Club (CNWSC) (comprising, and formerly called, the Coventry and North Warwickshire Cricket Club (CNWCC), founded in 1851) is an amateur sports club in Coventry, England. Its 1st and 2nd cricket XIs were, as of 2014, in the Birmingham and District Premier League 2nd and 1st Divisions respectively. The cricket teams play their home games at the club's ground in Binley Road, Coventry. Collins Obuya played for the club in 2003. The England cricketer Ian Bell at one time played for the club.

The cricket ground was one of three venues historically used by Warwickshire County Cricket Club, which now plays solely at Edgbaston Cricket Ground in Birmingham.

The sports club is a members' club, in which is also open to the public and provides facilities for other sports in addition to cricket, including tennis, netball, bridge, squash, racquetball and physical fitness training. It hosts a variety of events and sessions such as private salsa classes and baby sensory, these are all bookable through their own entities.

== Notable members ==
- Ian Bell (born 1982), England cricketer
- John Collings, British and English bridge international
- Martin Jones, British and English bridge international
- Susan Norton (née Stockdale), English bridge international and world champion
- Gareth Roberts FRS, statistician and bridge player

== See also ==
- List of English cricket clubs
