= Scorers, Shirley =

Cricket ground in Solihull

Scorers
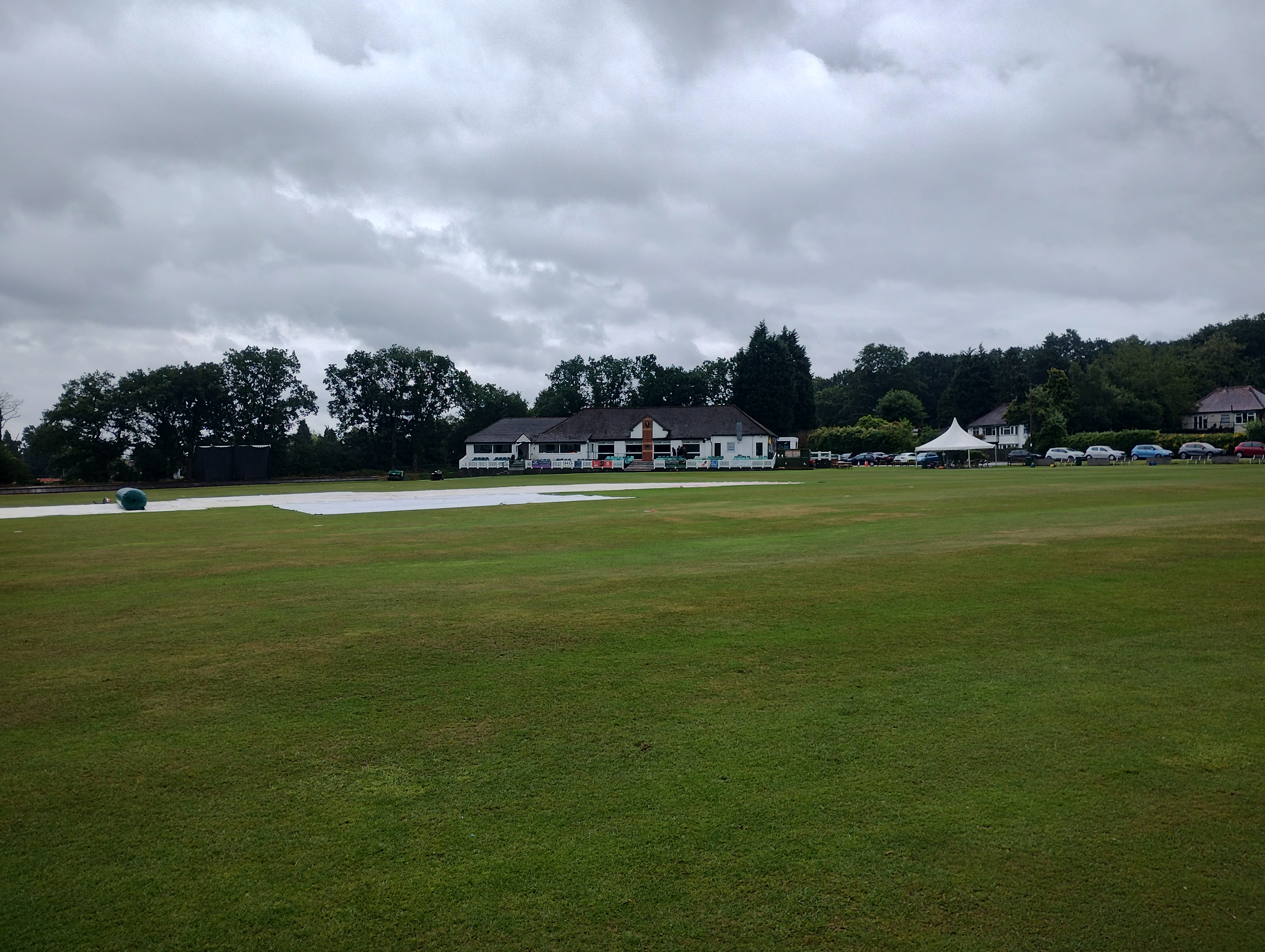
- Scorers in 2023

Ground information
- Location: Shirley, Solihull, West Midlands
- Coordinates: 52.421366°N 1.821692°W
- Home club: Moseley Cricket Club
- Establishment: 1956 (first recorded match)

International information
- First WODI: 10 July 2013: Ireland v Pakistan
- First WT20I: 8 July 2013: Ireland v Pakistan
- Last WT20I: 10 September 2014: Ireland v South Africa

Team information
Central Sparks	(2023–present)
- As of 13 July 2023; Source: CricketArchive

Scorers is a cricket ground in Shirley, Solihull that is the home of Moseley Cricket Club, who played their first recorded match on the ground in 1956.

Scorers has hosted Warwickshire County Cricket Club Second XI matches since 1972. A game apiece in the 1979, 1982 and 1986 ICC Trophy tournaments were held at the ground.

The ground hosted Division Seven of the inaugural Women's Twenty20 Cup in 2009, and the Midlands and North Division Three of the 2010 Women's Twenty20 Cup. It also hosted Warwickshire Women matches between 2010 and 2015.

The ground hosted its first international matches on 8 July 2013, with two Women's Twenty20 Internationals (WT20Is) between Ireland and Pakistan, both won by Pakistan. The ground hosted its first Women's One Day International two days later, between the same sides, again won by Pakistan. The ground went on to host three WT20Is between Ireland and South Africa in September 2014.

In July 2023, the ground played host to its first Rachael Heyhoe Flint Trophy match, between Central Sparks and Western Storm, although the match was abandoned (with a toss).
