= Alan Gough (cricketer) =

English cricketer (born 1972)

Personal information
- Full name: Alan James Gough
- Born: 30 April 1972 (age 54); Ashby-de-la-Zouch, Leicestershire, England
- Batting: Right-handed

Domestic team information
- Years: Team
- 2001: Worcestershire Cricket Board

Career statistics
Competition	LA
Matches	1
Runs scored	14
Batting average	14.00
100s/50s	–/–
Top score	14
Balls bowled	54
Wickets	1
Bowling average	30.00
5 wickets in innings	–
10 wickets in match	–
Best bowling	1/30
Catches/stumpings	–/–
- Source: Cricinfo, 1 November 2010

Alan James Gough (born 30 April 1972) is a former English cricketer. Gough was a right-handed batsman. He was born at Ashby-de-la-Zouch, Leicestershire.

Gough represented the Worcestershire Cricket Board in a single List A match against Buckinghamshire in the 1st round of the 2002 Cheltenham & Gloucester Trophy which was played in 2001. In his only List A match, he scored 14 runs and took a single wicket at a cost of 30 runs.
