= Twickenham Cricket Club =

Twickenham Cricket Club is an historic amateur cricket club in Twickenham in the United Kingdom. Twickenham played their first ever game in 1833 when they locked horns with Thames Ditton Cricket Club. A copy of the scorecard from that game hangs in the club's home, the pavilion on Twickenham Green.

== Early history ==
The earliest record of cricket being played in Twickenham dates back to 1735. It is contained in a letter by Lady Suffolk to her husband, suggesting she had learned of the game at Marble Hill House and might practice that afternoon.

The first recorded match played by Twickenham Cricket Club was on 29 July 1833 against Thames Ditton. The two clubs met again for a centenary match in 1933. The match stands unique as the only joint centenary match played by the original teams.

Some early cricket matches were played "For the Honour of the Game" whilst others were played for "A New Ball". Other quirks of the early games include batsmen being "Thrown out" rather than "Run Out" and "Hit Foot" rather than "LBW" or "Leg Before Wicket". What is currently termed as a victory "By and Innings" was then referred to as "Single Handed".

The old score cards show comparatively low scores, with 73 being the highest individual batsman's score for the twenty-year period.

== Teams ==
=== 1st XI ===
Since 2007, Twickenham's premier side has competed in the Middlesex County Cricket League (MCCL), winning promotion from Division 3 in their inaugural season under the captaincy of Jon Varney. Promotion from Division 2 to the MCCL Premier Division followed in 2009 thanks in part to a successful season by ex TCC junior, James Munting. He took 5 wickets on 6 occasions, a standing club record. New captain, powerful top order batsman Carlos Nunes was also very influential. In a dramatic final game of the 2009 season the Twickenham tail were guided from a seemingly impossible position by the experienced John-Pierre Cronje, to achieve the necessary draw against promotion rivals, Southgate CC, to pip them to promotion. The dramatic achievement was immortalised by the opposition's light hearted, comical depiction of how Adolf Hitler may have interpreted the result, on YouTube.

Twickenham found Premier league cricket challenging, lasting just 2 seasons before they were relegated in 2011. The acquisition of Indian Left Arm spinner Parminder Singh in 2012 proved decisive as well as bringing on internal talent as he returned Twickenham CC best bowling figures of 8-18 early on in a season which saw him finish with a bowling average of just 10 runs per wicket taken. Promotion was secured with just 1 defeat all season and 12 victories (2 draws and 3 abandonments due to inclement weather). Singh continued leading the Twickenham attack and the records continued to be broken. In the 2013 season Twickenham finished mid table in the Premiership, thanks in no small part to Singh's record breaking June when he took 18 wickets, the most by any Twickenham bowler in one month. In 2014 Singh took a club record 52 wickets in a season which saw Twickenham finish runners up only to Teddington in the club's highest ever league position.

The Ts have remained in the Premier League since then and in 2023 managed to win their first ever senior Middlesex-wide trophy; the Middlesex T20. They beat Indian Gymkhana and Teddington on the way to a finals' day at Ealing CC on 16 July 2023. Neville Talbot, Pat Dixon, Mayank Malhotra and Gus McKenzie were at the centre of Twickenham's narrow victory against Ealing in the semi-final. The final against Harrow St Mary's was a rather more straightforward affair, Twickenham getting home with 10 balls and six wickets to spare. Adam Mather (2–19) and Malhotra again (2–17) were at the centre of the Ts' bowling efforts, with Dixon (30), Malhotra (29) and Preet Patel (22no) leading the way with the bat.

=== Other competitive teams ===
In 2008 Twickenham increased their number of Saturday sides from the long-standing four teams to five. All five now play in the Middlesex County Cricket League. Success of the higher rated teams in the club saw demand for places exceed supply in 2014 and in order to accommodate paid up members, a 6th XI was formed playing friendly matches.

=== Sunday cricket ===
Twickenham have traditionally played Sunday friendly cricket. In 2012 Middlesex launched an U21 Development League where eight of the eleven players must be under 21 years of age. In order to encourage participation from the younger generation, Development Cricket is played in coloured kit (Pyjama Cricket) and with a pink ball – similar to televised one day cricket. Twickenham CC won the inaugural season of the competition.

=== Women's cricket ===
Twickenham also runs a successful women's team which competes in various forms of the game within Middlesex and indeed Surrey. Twickenham's women's side generally plays games on Sundays and Wednesday evenings and home games are played on The Green.

Janet Bitmead was the key driver of the TCC women's section for many years, and in 2023 she was made a vice-president of the club. Sarai Knight has been captain since 2020.

=== Junior cricket ===
In addition to adult cricket, Twickenham run a number of teams for younger players. Training and introduction to the game of cricket is available from the age of 5 through the specially designed Allstars cricket. From the age of 9 to 17, players are able to progress to competitive cricket against other local sides in age groups of under 10, under 11, under 12, under 13, under 15 and under 17. The junior section is run by Liam Tebb and Eugene Berger training is available from ECB Qualified coaches.

=== Other sides ===
Twickenham Vets (Veterans) were established in 2012 and is made up of players over the age of 40. Friendly games are played regularly throughout the season, against teams of varying standards, including but not exclusively against other vets teams. Fixtures are played on Sundays and captained by Paul Johnson.

Through the season, Twickenham compete in a number of midweek fixtures with home games played on The Green. Fixtures include competitive 20/20 games and other friendly fixtures. Twickenham's cricket week is traditionally run the first full week of August and includes a number of friendly games – including an annual game against Thames Ditton – to commemorate the original game in 1833.

== Twickenham Green ==
Twickenham Green (or The Green) is the primary home venue for Twickenham CC First XI and Second XI (with home games being played on alternate Saturdays). The Green is also the home venue for a number of fixtures on Sunday's including the Lady's XI as well as various midweek fixtures hosted by Twickenham CC. The Green has also hired by local businesses to play fixtures not involving Twickenham CC.

Twickenham Green is a surviving fragment of Hounslow Heath and aside from hosting cricket matches, The Green is believed to have been the location of a Pest House in the 19th Century for those unfortunate enough to be quarantined through infectious diseases. In 1894 The Green was the location of a water pump and it has also been the home of a Salvation Army Band. Prior to becoming the home of Twickenham Cricket Club in the mid-1850s, The Green was occupied by allotments and land allocated to the poor, there remains a listed Cattle Trough in the North East corner of The Green. The current owners of the land are London Borough of Richmond upon Thames and managed by the Parks and Open Spaces Service. The land is registered as Common Land.,

The Green is overlooked by The Holy Trinity Church of England Church to the South East and bordered by a number of shops to the North. The Southern corner is bordered by Archdeacon Cambridge's Church of England Primary School and the North East corner hosts a restaurant. There are in total 6 churches visible from The Green and when locals have spotted them all, time can be passed attempting to count as many visible London busses at any one time, due to the popular bus routes along Staines Road and Hampton Road combined with occasional heavy traffic.

Cricket is played at any time on the Western half of The Green with the remainder use for informal pursuits and picnicking by the public, particularly in good weather. On occasions The Green Hosts events including Circuses and Fairs. The Green has been bordered by Lime and Horse Chestnut Trees since 1872 which provide a home to birds, bats, invertebrates and fungi and is divided by a simple path running from Hampton Road to Staines Road.

In winter, the Green is the home venue for Thamesians Rugby Football Club and is also home to a cat called Zinzan who is rumoured to keep The Green free of vermin.

=== The pavilion ===
The pavilion is a white, rectangular-shaped building housing changing facilities, washing facilities, storage facilities, a kitchen and a bar. The first floor is significantly smaller than the ground floor and is used for home team changing. The bulk of the ground floor is consumed by a bar and associated communal area where cricket teas are served and eaten. The building is serviced with terrestrial and satellite television as well as Wifi.

The pavilion is located in the southern corner of The Green on the apex of First Cross Road and Hampton Road. Parking for the Pavilion is available on these roads at a cost. The Pavilion is fronted by a raised veranda, is surrounded by paving and has a large clock facing the pitch in a traditional cricketing pavilion form.

The pavilion in its current state was opened by The Earl of Wessex on 19 April 2005 after the previous structure, referred to as "Jack The Stripper", was damaged by fire.

The total area of the pavilion covers fractionally over 100 square metres, including the storage space for ground maintenance equipment.

== Notable players ==
Twickenham CC's honours boards are displayed within the Pavilion and note members holding important positions including non-playing positions such as Secretaries and chairmen and playing positions such as Team Captains and Club Captains.
