= Staffordshire Club Cricket Championship =

The South Staffordshire County League, formerly known as the "Staffordshire Club Cricket Championship", is the main cricket league in South Staffordshire.

== History ==
The league's history goes back to 1973, and it has acted as a feeder league to the Birmingham and District Premier League since 1999. Currently, at the end of each season, the Premier Division winners enter into the play offs against the winners of the Shropshire, Warwickshire and Worcestershire County Leagues for a place in the BDCPL 2nd division.

Division 1 Champions

- 1975: Fordhouses
- 1976: Little Stoke
- 1977: Little Stoke
- 1978: Cannock
- 1979: Fordhouses
- 1980: Fordhouses
- 1981: Fordhouses
- 1982: Wombourne
- 1983: Wightwick
- 1984: Fordhouses
- 1985: Cannock
- 1986: Himley
- 1987: Wombourne
- 1988: Himley
- 1989: Penn
- 1990: Penn
- 1991: Cannock & Rugeley
- 1992: Cannock & Rugeley
- 1993: Cannock & Rugeley
- 1994: Penn
- 1995: Fordhouses
- 1996: Fordhouses
- 1997: Penn
- 1998: Fordhouses

Since 1999 the winner of the Staffordshire Club Cricket Championship has been promoted to the Birmingham and District Premier League

- 1999: Penkridge
- 2000: Wheaton Aston
- 2001: Wednesbury
- 2002: Beacon
- 2003: Lichfield
- 2004: Beacon
- 2005: Wombourne
- 2006: Old Wulfs Tettenhall
- 2007: Lichfield
- 2008: Milford Hall
- 2009: Brewood
- 2010: Wednesbury
- 2011: Penkridge
- 2012: Milford Hall
- 2013: Hawkins
- 2014: Pelsall
- 2015: Lichfield
- 2016: Milford Hall
- 2017: Pelsall
- 2018: Beacon
- 2019: Pelsall
- 2020: Milford Hall finished top of the Premier Division during a season shortened by the COVID-19 pandemic.
- 2021: Lichfield
- 2022: Tamworth
- 2023: Milford Hall
- 2024: Fordhouses
- 2025: Milford Hall

== 2025 Divisions ==
Below is a list of all 2025 Divisions for the South Staffordshire Cricket League.

=== Premier Division ===
- Beacon
- Cannock
- Fordhouses
- Hammerwich
- Lichfield
- Milford Hall
- Pelsall
- Penkridge
- Tamworth 2nd XI
- Walsall
- Wolverhampton 2nd XI (P)
- Wombourne

=== Division 1 ===
- Aldridge (R)
- Bloxwich
- Brewood
- Milford Hall 2nd XI
- Old Wulfs Tettenhall
- Rugeley
- Swindon
- Wednesbury
- West Bromwich Dartmouth 2nd XI
- Wightwick & Finchfield
- Wombourne 2nd XI

=== Division 2 ===
- Aldridge 2nd XI (P)
- Beacon 2nd XI
- Brewood 2nd XI
- Coseley
- Highcroft & Great Barr Unity 1st XI
- Penn
- Pelsall 2nd XI
- Penkridge 2nd XI
- Springvale (R)
- Walsall 2nd XI
- West Bromwich Dartmouth 3rd XI
- Whittington

=== Division 3 ===
- Bloxwich 2nd XI (P)
- Cannock 2nd XI
- Fordhouses 2nd XI
- Hammerwich 2nd XI (R)
- Lichfield 2nd XI
- Old Wulfrunians Tettenhall 2nd XI
- Penn 2nd XI
- Rugeley 2nd XI
- Springhill
- Walsall YPF (R)
- Whittington 2nd XI (P)
- Wightwick & Finchfield 2nd XI

=== Division 4 ===
- Brewood 3rd XI
- Codsall (R)
- Fordhouses 3rd XI
- Hammerwich 3rd XI
- Milford Hall 3rd XI (P)
- Rushall
- Swindon 2nd XI (R)
- Wednesbury 2nd XI
- Whitmore Reans
- Wightwick & Finchfield 2nd XI
- Wolverhampton 4th XI
- Wombourne 3rd XI (P)

=== Division 5 ===
- Aldridge 3rd XI (P)
- Burntwood St Matthew's (R)
- Cannock 3rd XI
- Codsall 2nd XI
- Hawkins Sports
- Highcroft & Great Barr 2nd XI (R)
- Lichfield 3rd XI
- Old Wulfs Tennenhall
- Penkridge 3rd XI
- Springhill 2nd XI
- Tamworth 3rd XI
- Wightwick & Finchfield 3rd XI (P)

=== Division 6 ===
- Armitage
- Beacon 3rd XI
- Coseley 2nd XI
- Elford (R)
- Hammerwich 4th XI (P)
- Penn 3rd XI
- Swindon 3rd XI
- Walsall 3rd XI (R)
- Walsall YPF 2nd XI (R)
- Wednesbury 3rd XI (P)
- West Bromwich Dartmouth 4th XI
- Whitmore Reans

=== Division 7 ===
- Aldridge 4th XI
- Beacon 4th XI (P)
- Bloxwich 3rd XI
- Brewood 4th XI
- Fordhouses 4th XI
- Milford Hall 4th XI
- Pelsall 3rd XI (R)
- Old Wulfrunians Tettenhall 4th XI (R)
- Rushall 2nd XI
- Rugeley 3rd XI
- Wightwick & Finchfield 4th XI
- Wolverhampton 5th XI

=== Division 8 North ===
- Armitage 2nd XI
- Cannock 4th XI (R)
- Hammerwich 5th XI
- Highcroft & Great Barr 3rd XI
- Penkridge 4th XI
- Tamworth 4th XI
- Wednesbury 4th XI
- Whittington 3rd XI

=== Division 8 South ===
- Codsall 3rd XI
- Coseley 3rd XI
- Old Wulfrunians Tettenhall 5th XI
- Penn 4th XI
- Springhill 3rd XI
- Springvale 3rd XI
- Wightwick & Finchfield 5th XI
- Wombourne 4th XI
