= Andrew S. Bryant =

- Born: March 3, 1841; Springfield, Massachusetts, US
- Died: October 6, 1931 (aged 90)
- Military career
- Allegiance: United States
- Branch: US Army
- Service years: 1862–1863
- Rank: Sergeant Major
- Unit: 46th Regiment Massachusetts Volunteer Infantry
- Awards: Medal of Honor

Andrew Symmes Bryant (March 3, 1841 – October 6, 1931) was an American soldier who fought in the American Civil War. Bryant received the country's highest award for bravery during combat, the Medal of Honor, for his action at New Bern, North Carolina, on May 23, 1863. He was honored with the award on August 13, 1873.

== Biography ==
Bryant was born on March 3, 1841, in Springfield, Massachusetts. He joined the Army from Springfield in August 1862, and mustered out with his regiment in July 1863.

Bryant died on October 6, 1931.

== Medal of Honor citation ==
By his courage and judicious disposition of his guard of 16 men, stationed in a small earthwork at the head of the bridge, held in check and repulsed for a half hour a fierce attack of a strong force of the enemy, thus probably saving the city New Bern from capture.

== See also ==
- List of American Civil War Medal of Honor recipients: A–F
