= Shashi Ranjan Kumar =

Indian civil servant

Secretary, Union Public Service Commission

Personal details
- Born: December 4, 1968 (age 57) Gaya, Bihar, India
- Education: B.Tech (Electrical engineering)
- Occupation: Civil servant

Shashi Ranjan Kumar (born 4 December 1968) is an Indian civil servant and author. He is currently serving as the Secretary of the Union Public Service Commission (UPSC), Government of India.

== Early life and education ==
Kumar was born on 4 December 1968 in the Gaya district of Bihar, India. He received his early education in village schools. He later earned a Bachelor of Technology degree in Electrical engineering and joined the Indian Administrative Service (IAS) in 1992, being allotted to the Tripura cadre.

== Career ==
He is currently serving as the Secretary of the Union Public Service Commission (UPSC), Government of India.

== Published works ==
- Samudra Tat Par
- Mysteries of the Universe
- The Decline of the Hindu Civilization: Lessons from the Past
