= Knowle and Dorridge Cricket Club =

UK cricket team

Knowle and Dorridge Cricket Club is an amateur cricket club in Knowle, near Solihull in Warwickshire. They play their home games at Station Road in Knowle. The club's 1st XI currently play in the Birmingham and District Premier League.

== Roll of Honour ==
- 1998 Division One 1st XI Runners-Up
- 1998 Division One 2nd XI Runners-Up
- 1999 Division One 2nd XI Champions
- 2000 Division One 1st XI Champions
- 2001 1st XI Challenge Cup Champions
- 2003 Premier Division 2nd XI Runners-Up
- 2005 1st XI Challenge Cup Champions
- 2007 Premier Division 1st XI runners-Up
- 2007 Graham Williamson Trophy Runners-Up
- 2009 Premier Division 1st XI Champions
- 2017 Premier Division 1st XI Champions

== Leading run scorers (1982-2021) ==
- Kevin Bray - 9008 runs (243 innings)
- Alex Phillips - 6083 (164)
- Sam Reddish - 4346 (176)
- Daniel Dalton - 4259 (141)
- Nigel Moore - 3845 (180)
- Tom Jameson - 3227 (140)
- Ian Maddocks - 3055 (149)

== Leading wicket takers (1982-2021) ==
- Kevin Bray - 393 @ 15
- Will Mottram - 385 @ 22
- Jamie Spires - 327 @ 21
- Nigel Moore - 314 @ 21
- Ben Coley - 308 @21
- Chris Davidson - 290 @20
- Jack Grundy - 278 @ 20
- Tom Jameson - 236 @ 23
- Darren Altree - 208 @ 16

== International players ==
- Allan Donald
- Gladstone Small
- David Hemp
- Dougie Brown
- Travis Friend
- Jan-Berrie Burger
- Ryan McLaren
- George Worker
- Ian Bell
- Carlos Brathwaite
- Samit Patel
