= Halesowen Cricket Club =

English cricket club in West Midlands

Halesowen, West Midlands
Personnel
- Captain: Alexei Kervezee
- Chairman: Carl Bust
- Manager: Joe Tromans

Team information
- Colors: Red & Yellow
- Founded: 1856
- Home ground: Seth Somers Park
- Official website: www.halesowencricletclub.co.uk

Halesowen Cricket Club is an English cricket club in Halesowen, West Midlands that has four senior Saturday cricket sides. Their 1st currently play in the Birmingham and District Premier League. The 2nd, 3rd, 4th, 5th & 6th XI's play in the Worcestershire County Cricket League. The Club also has a youth cricket section, where there are teams for children between the ages of five and 17. Each year group has its own team, and plays representative matches throughout the season. In addition to this, there are coaching nights run for children of all ages and abilities at the club.

== Structure ==
Halesowen CC is a private members club run by Committee, the committee is elected at the AGM. There are currently senior and youth cricket sub-committees, which fall under the category of 'playing cricketers'. The club also operates a social membership section.

== Homeground ==
From its founding until 1948, Halesowen Cricket Club played at the Grove Recreation Ground (named the "Stourbridge Road Ground" until 1929). In 1948, the club temporarily moved to the newly-built Manor Abbey Sports Ground which it shared with Halesowen Athletics and Cycling Club. In 1954, club president Dan Wellings announced that "it was time that the club had a ground of its own" and, with the financial support of the Seth Somers Trust, submitted plans to build a new ground and pavilion on the Grange estate. The club officially opened Seth Somers Park, their current home ground, on 27 April 1957 in a match against Solihull. The 3rd and 4th teams play at the second ground based at the Earls High School, Halesowen.

On 31 March 2021, the club announced via its website that it would be applying to the Seth Somers Trust to rename the ground "The Trevor Argent Memorial Ground, Seth Somers Park" in memory of late chairman Trevor Argent.

== Honours ==
Birmingham & District Premier League, Premier Division 1st XI

- 2002 : Winners BDCPL Winners

ECB Premier League, First Division 1st XI

- 1999 : Promotion to Premier Division ECB Promotion
- 2016 : Winners of the Worcs County Canterbury Cup beating Hagley at New Road (WCCC)
- 2017 : Promotion to Division One Birmingham and District Premier League

== Accreditations ==
Halesowen CC were awarded ClubMark status in 2008.
