= Shashi Ranjan (cricketer) =

Indian cricketer (born 1981)

Personal information
- Born: Jamalpur, Bihar, India
- Nickname: Sashi
- Batting: Right-handed
- Bowling: Right-arm off break

Domestic team information
- Years: Team
- 2001/02–2002/03: Bihar

Career statistics
Competition	FC	LA
Matches	2	5
Runs scored	28	15
Batting average	14.00	5.00
100s/50s	0/0	0/0
Top score	26*	13
Balls bowled	486	288
Wickets	3	5
Bowling average	102.33	41.00
5 wickets in innings	0	0
10 wickets in match	0	0
Best bowling	3/170	3/30
Catches/stumpings	0/0	2/0
- Source: ESPNcricinfo, 10 July 2013

Shashi Ranjan (born 2 November 1981) is an Indian former cricketer who played for Bihar. He was born in Jamalpur, Bihar. He was bought by Delhi Daredevils for the 2010 Indian Premier League. In 2017 he became a teacher in Pathways Schools.
