= Moseley Cricket Club =

Moseley Cricket Club is an amateur cricket club in Solihull. Their 1st and 2nd XIs currently play in the Birmingham and District Premier League premier division. The club was a founder member of the Birmingham League in English club cricket, winning the ECB National Club Cricket Championship in 1980. They play their home games at Scorers, Streetsbrook Road, Solihull, B90 West Midlands. Used by Warwickshire County Cricket Club for non-first class fixtures.
