= Humayun Farhat =

Pakistani cricketer and coach (born 1981)

Personal information
- Born: 24 January 1981 (age 45); Lahore, Punjab, Pakistan
- Batting: Right-handed
- Role: Wicket-keeper
- Relatives: Imran Farhat (brother)

International information
- National side: Pakistan (2001)
- Only Test (cap 168): 27 March 2001 v New Zealand
- ODI debut (cap 136): 8 March 2001 v Sri Lanka
- Last ODI: 20 March 2001 v Sri Lanka

Career statistics
Competition	Test	ODI
Matches	1	5
Runs scored	54	60
Batting average	27.00	20.00
100s/50s	0/0	0/0
Top score	28	39
Catches/stumpings	0/–	4/3
- Source: ESPNcricinfo, 4 February 2006

Humayun Farhat (Urdu: ہمایوں فرحت; born 24 January 1981) is a Pakistani cricket coach and former cricketer who played for the Pakistan national cricket team in 2001 as a wicket-keeper in his only Test match. He is one of two brothers to have played Test cricket for Pakistan.

== Personal life ==
His brother Imran Farhat has also played international cricket for Pakistan.

== Cricket career ==
He played one Test match, in March 2001 against New Zealand and five One Day International matches for Pakistan. He is the only wicketkeeper to have played Test cricket who has not recorded a single dismissal.

He played in five One Day Internationals and a one test match for Pakistan. Due to the presence of first-choice wicketkeepers Moin Khan and Rashid Latif, he could not really cement his place in the national team. In 2007, he participated in the unofficial Indian Cricket League (ICL), representing Lahore Badshahs. His participation in ICL meant that he was banned from the Pakistan team for life. The rise of Kamran Akmal as the first-choice wicket-keeper in the late 2000s further dented his chances in the national team.

He retired from domestic cricket after the 2014–15 season, having played more than a hundred List A and first-class matches.

== Coaching career ==
In August 2021, for the 2021-22 domestic season, he was appointed fielding coach to the Central Punjab's first XI team and was also appointed head coach to its Under-19 and Under-16 squads.

In November 2022, he began to undertake level 3 coaching courses with the PCB.
