= Andrew Bryan (cricketer) =

English cricketer

Personal information
- Full name: Andrew Paul Bryan
- Born: 31 July 1964 (age 62); Birmingham, Warwickshire, England
- Batting: Right-handed

Domestic team information
- Years: Team
- 2001: Worcestershire Cricket Board
- 1991–1992: Staffordshire

Career statistics
Competition	LA
Matches	3
Runs scored	3
Batting average	–
100s/50s	–/–
Top score	3*
Balls bowled	52
Wickets	–
Bowling average	–
5 wickets in innings	–
10 wickets in match	–
Best bowling	–
Catches/stumpings	–/–
- Source: Cricinfo, 1 November 2010

Andrew Paul Bryan (born 31 July 1964) is a former English cricketer. Bryan was a right-handed batsman. He was born in Birmingham, Warwickshire.

Bryan first played County Cricket for Staffordshire in the 1991 Minor Counties Championship against Cumberland. From 1991 to 1992, he represented the county in 5 Championship matches, the last of which came against Lincolnshire.

Bryan next appeared in County Cricket when he represented the Worcestershire Cricket Board in 3 List A matches in 2001. These came against Staffordshire and Cumberland in the 2001 Cheltenham & Gloucester Trophy and against Buckinghamshire in the 1st round of the 2002 Cheltenham & Gloucester Trophy which was played in 2001. In his 3 List A matches, he scored 3 runs, with a high score of 3*.
