= James Burgoyne =

English cricketer

Personal information
- Full name: James Burgoyne
- Born: 21 February 1980 (age 46); Wordsley, Worcestershire, England
- Batting: Right-handed
- Bowling: Right-arm medium

Domestic team information
- Years: Team
- 1999: Worcestershire Cricket Board

Career statistics
Competition	LA
Matches	1
Runs scored	0
Batting average	–
100s/50s	–/–
Top score	0*
Balls bowled	54
Wickets	1
Bowling average	46.00
5 wickets in innings	–
10 wickets in match	–
Best bowling	1/46
Catches/stumpings	–/–
- Source: Cricinfo, 2 November 2010

James Burgoyne (born 21 February 1980) is a former English cricketer. Burgoyne was a right-handed batsman who bowled right-arm medium pace. He was born at Wordsley, Worcestershire.

Burgoyne represented the Worcestershire Cricket Board in a single List A match against the Kent Cricket Board in the 1999 NatWest Trophy. In his only List A match, he took one wicket at a cost of 46 runs.
