= Warwickshire Cricket League =

The Warwickshire Cricket League is the largest recreational cricket competition for clubs within Warwickshire. Established in 1989, it has served since 1998 as an official feeder league to the Birmingham & District Premier League.

Several clubs have progressed through the structure with notable success. Aston Manor (2005), Berkswell (2006) and Sutton Coldfield (2014) each achieved back‑to‑back promotions from Birmingham League Division Three in the seasons that followed. Attock Cricket Club are the current league champions.

In 2018, an ECB‑led restructuring of the recreational game resulted in the Warwickshire League becoming the Warwickshire County League. As part of this reorganisation, the competition moved from Tier 5 to Tier 3 within the national club cricket pyramid, reflecting its increased status and alignment with the wider pathway.

== Winners of the Warwickshire Cricket League (Since 2000) ==
- 2000: Tamworth
- 2001: Old Edwardians
- 2002: Dorridge
- 2003: Olton and West Warwickshire
- 2004: Aston Manor
- 2005: Berkswell
- 2006: Olton and West Warwickshire
- 2007: Bablake Old Boys
- 2008: Moseley Ashfield
- 2009: Bablake Old Boys
- 2010: Handsworth
- 2011: Streetly
- 2012: Kings Heath
- 2013: Sutton Coldfield
- 2014: Aston Manor
- 2015: Handsworth
- 2016: Nuneaton
- 2017: Rugby
- 2018: Bedworth
- 2019: Walmley
- 2020: Coventry & NW (Winner of a Play off vs Moseley Ashfield)
- 2021: Stratford
- 2022: Coventry & NW
- 2023: Olton and West Warwickshire
- 2024: Handsworth
- 2025: Attock
- 2026: Aston Manor

== Divisional structure (2026 season) ==
The Warwickshire Cricket League is organised into multiple divisions. Following changes to the recreational game introduced by the ECB at the end of the 2018 season, several Birmingham League clubs were reallocated to the Warwickshire League. These clubs largely formed the new Premier Division, alongside the top four teams from the 2018 Warwickshire Premier Division.

=== Premier Division ===
- Aston Manor
- Bedworth
- Coventry & NW (R)
- Handsworth (R)
- Leamington Spa 2nds (P)
- Marston Green (P)
- Olton & WW
- Rugby
- Solihull B'field
- Streetly
- Stratford Upon Avon
- Walmley

=== Division 1 ===
- Bablake OB
- Coventry Shaheen (Formerly Pak Shaheen)
- Hampton & Solihull
- Harborne 2nd Xi
- Kings Heath
- Lyndworth (P)
- Moseley Ashfield (R)
- Pickwick P&M (P)
- Smethwick 2nd XI
- Solihull Municipal (R)
- Standard (R)
- Sutton Coldfield

=== Division 2 ===
- Ambleside (P)
- Attock 2nd XI
- Berkswell 2nd XI
- Corley
- Coventry & NW 2nd XI
- Earlswood Warks (P)
- Kenilworth
- Knowle & Dorridge 2nd XI (R)
- Nether Whitacre (R)
- Nuneaton (R)
- Warwick
- Water Orton

=== Division 3 ===
- Aston Manor 2nd XI
- Bridge Trust OB
- Dorridge 2nd XI (P)
- Dunlop Pak Stars (R)
- Fillongley
- Kenilworth Wardens 2nd XI (R)
- Knowle Village (P)
- Moseley 2nd XI
- RMCC (R)
- Stockton Star
- Studley
- Wishaw

=== Division 4 ===
- Bedworth 2nd XI
- Bronze (R)
- Castle Brom
- Copsewood WIW
- Griff & Coton (P)
- Leamington Khalsa (P)
- Oakfield & Rowlands
- Pickwick P&M 2nd XI (P)
- Rugby 2nd XI (R)
- Stratford Upon Avon 2nd XI (R)
- Walmley 2nd XI
- Weoley Hill (P)

=== Division 5 East ===
- Atherstone Town
- Attleborough
- Coleshill
- Coventry & NW 3rd XI (P)
- Coventry Blues
- Coventry Shaheen
- Dunlop Pak Stars
- Leamington Spa
- Nuneaton
- Standard 2nd XI (P)
- Warwick
- Wolvey (R)

=== Division 5 West ===
- Attock 3rd XI (R)
- Four Oaks Saints (R)
- Handsworth 2nd XI
- Kings Heath 2nd XI
- Lyndworth 2nd XI (P)
- Marston Green 2nd XI (P)
- Moseley 3rd XI
- Old Edwardians
- Olton & WW 2nd XI
- Sheldon Marl
- Thimblemill (R)
- Ward End Unity

=== Division 6 East ===
- Alvis
- Bablake 2nd XI (R)
- Corley 2nd XI (P)
- Dorridge 3rd XI
- Kenilworth 2nd XI
- Kenilworth Wardens 3rd XI
- Knowle & Dorridge 3rd XI
- Knowle Village 2nd XI
- Newbold
- Newdigate (P)
- RMCC 2nd XI
- Stockton Star 2nd XI (R)

=== Division 6 West ===
- Aston Manor 3rd XI
- Aston Unity (P)
- Bournville Village
- Earlswood Warks 2nd XI (R)
- Hampton & Solihull 2nd XI
- Moseley Ashfield 2nd XI (R)
- Old Edwardians 2nd XI
- Smethwick 3rd XI (P)
- Solihull B'field 2nd XI
- Solihull Municipal 2nd XI
- Streetly 2nd XI
- Sutton Coldfield 2nd XI

=== Division 7 East ===
- Alvis
- Ambleside
- Bedworth
- Berkswell 3rd XI (R)
- Bulkington (P)
- Copsewood WIW 2nd XI
- Coventry Blues
- Fillongley
- Leamington Khalsa
- Leamington Spa 4th XI (R)
- Massey Ferguson
- Warwick (P)

=== Division 7 West ===
- Catherine de Barnes (R)
- Coleshill 2nd XI
- Four Oaks Saints 2nd XI
- Kings Heath 3rd XI (P)
- Knowle & Dorridge 4th XI (R)
- Olton & WW 3rd XI (R)
- Sheldon Marl'gh
- Sutton Coldfield 3rd XI (P)
- Thimblemill 2nd XI
- Walmley 3rd XI
- Weoley Hill 2nd XI
- Wishaw 2nd XI
