= Stourbridge Cricket Club =

- League: Birmingham and District Cricket League

Personnel
- Captain: Josh Banks
- Chairman: Harilal Jivan-Patel

Team information
- City: Stourbridge, West Midlands
- Founded: 1842; 183 years ago
- Home ground: War Memorial Athletic Ground
- Capacity: 2,626

Stourbridge Cricket Club is an English cricket club based in Stourbridge, West Midlands. The club play at the War Memorial Athletic Ground in Stourbridge, and compete in the Birmingham and District Cricket League.

Founded in 1842, Stourbridge was a leading side in the Birmingham and District Cricket League from 1894 to 2003, winning the Division 1 title in 1919, 1987 and 1989. They also won the William Younger Cup, now known as the Cockspur Cup, at Lord's in 1986. They were relegated from the Birmingham and District Cricket League after the 2003 season.

The club's ground was used regularly for first class cricket by Worcestershire between 1905 and 1962, and has also hosted two ICC Trophy matches. Several Test players have played for the club, including Humayun Farhat, Imran Farhat, Don Kenyon and Ron Headley.

In the 2011 season, Stourbridge First XI secured promotion to the Birmingham District League with a record points haul of 401 after being very close 3 seasons before, when points deduction stopped them from being promoted and coming second or third in other seasons.
