= Himley Cricket Club =

- League: Birmingham and District Premier League Premier Division

Personnel
- Captain: Olly Westbury
- Chairman: Matt Jeavons
- Manager: David Collins

Team information
- City: Himley, South Staffordshire
- Founded: 1883; 142 years ago
- Home ground: Himley Cricket Club Ground
- Official website: https://www.himleycc.co.uk

Himley Cricket Club is an amateur cricket club in Himley, South Staffordshire.

Founded in 1883, their 1st XI is currently in the Birmingham and District Premier League Premier Division, and their 2nd XI in the first division. They run 3 further sides on Saturdays, 2 in the Worcestershire County League and 1 in the Staffordshire Club Cricket Championship.

The club reached the National Village Championship Knock-out Final at Lord’s in 1988 playing against Goatacre Cricket Club from Wiltshire.

== Ground ==
Himley Cricket Club play their home games at the Himley Cricket Club Ground in Himley, South Staffordshire.

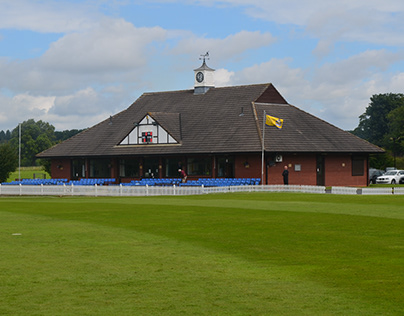
Himley Cricket Club Ground
