= Phil Newport =

English cricketer (born 1962)

Personal information
- Full name: Philip John Newport
- Born: 11 October 1962 (age 64); High Wycombe, Buckinghamshire, England
- Batting: Right-handed
- Bowling: Right-arm fast-medium

International information
- National side: England
- Test debut (cap 535): 25 August 1988 v Sri Lanka
- Last Test: 1 February 1991 v Australia

Domestic team information
- Years: Team
- 1981–1983: Buckinghamshire
- 1982–1999: Worcestershire
- 1987/88: Boland
- 1992/93: Northern Transvaal

Career statistics
Competition	Test	FC	LA
Matches	3	290	278
Runs scored	110	6,010	970
Batting average	27.50	24.13	11.82
100s/50s	0/0	0/22	0/1
Top score	40*	98	57
Balls bowled	669	46,352	12,619
Wickets	10	880	326
Bowling average	41.70	26.97	25.26
5 wickets in innings	0	35	3
10 wickets in match	0	3	0
Best bowling	4/87	8/52	5/22
Catches/stumpings	1/–	79/–	55/–
- Source: ESPNcricinfo, 24 December 2014

Philip John Newport (born 11 October 1962) is a former English first-class cricketer, who played primarily as a seam and swing bowler. Newport was a stalwart of Worcestershire County Cricket Club for most of the 1980s and 1990s, and played a key part in the county's triumphs in the late 1980s. Newport played in three Test matches for England between 1988 and 1991. He was born at High Wycombe in 1962.

== Life and career ==
After playing a number of times for Worcestershire's Second XI in 1982, Newport made his first-class debut against the touring Pakistanis at New Road in July of that year. However, he had an unpromising beginning to his career at this level, failing to take a wicket and seeing his eleven overs costing 64 runs as the tourists scored 467 for 4 declared on their way to an innings victory. He returned to the Second XI for a while, but was then called up for the local derby with Warwickshire at Edgbaston. In this game he took the wicket of Dennis Amiss; picking up another in the second innings.

Slowly Newport forced himself into contention for a regular spot in the county side, and in 1986 he made the breakthrough, winning his county cap and taking five wickets in an innings on five occasions, on his way to a total haul of 85 victims. He also scored his maiden first-class fifty in this season, the first of 22 he was to make in his career. Although he never managed to convert one of these into a century, his top score being 98 against the New Zealanders at Worcester in 1990.

Newport had a mediocre 1987 season in England, his first-class batting average of over 41 that year being artificially inflated by twelve not-outs in twenty five innings. He had a happier time in one-day cricket, taking 34 wickets at 16.70, including his career-best one-day analysis of 5–22. That winter he went to play for Boland in South African domestic cricket, and was reasonably successful, averaging 25 with the bat and 19 with the ball.

This set him up for the 1988 English season, and he put in some eye-catching performances. These included ten wickets in the match against Somerset (a match often remembered for Graeme Hick's 405 not out), which helped Worcestershire to an innings victory; a further nine against Lancashire in early June; and in the next match, his career-best bowling figures of 8–52 in a rain-affected match against Middlesex. He also took nine wickets against a powerful Essex team containing Graham Gooch and Allan Border, picking up Border's wicket in both innings.

This fine run of form brought Newport a place in the England team for the final Test match of the summer, against Sri Lanka in August. He acquitted himself well, taking 7–164 in the match, to help propel England to a comfortable seven-wicket victory, but was not selected for the (later cancelled) winter tour of India. He could console himself, however, with 93 first-class wickets, the best haul of his career, and – more significantly – Worcestershire's first County Championship title since 1974.

1989 started promisingly for Newport, with eleven wickets in Worcestershire's low-scoring win over the Australians (a rare defeat for the Australians that summer), and he was named in the team for the First Test. His second taste of cricket at this level, however, was a chastening experience, as Steve Waugh – on his first tour of England and on his way to 177 not out – took a liking to Newport's seamers, and the Worcestershire bowler ended the first innings with figures of 2–153. He had no chance to make amends, being allowed only five overs in Australia's second innings, and was dropped for the Second Test of England's painful Ashes summer. Again, the domestic game was his salvation as Worcestershire retained their Championship.

Newport's England career ran to only one more match. He was called up for the 1990/91 Perth Test while with the A team in Sri Lanka as a replacement for the injured Angus Fraser. He made 40 not out in a lost cause, coming to the crease with England 118 for 6, but did not impress with the ball, taking only one wicket and bowling six no-balls in his fourteen overs. He never played for England again, after a career lasting just three Tests and without a One Day International to his name.

In 1991, Newport helped Worcestershire to the Benson and Hedges Cup, and the Refuge Assurance Cup, defeating Lancashire in both finals.

He spent another winter in South Africa, this time with Northern Transvaal, in 1992/93, but apart from that the remainder of Newport's career was spent in familiar surroundings with Worcestershire. He reached 50 wickets in every season from 1991 to 1995, and in 1994 he won the NatWest Trophy with the county, taking 4–38 in the final against Warwickshire. But after that he gradually faded from first-team contention, although he did manage one last hurrah in 1997, when he took 7–37 in a drawn game against Leicestershire. Newport retired after the 1999 season, bowing out rather quietly with a National League game in which he did not bat or take a wicket, with only a single catch.

He subsequently became a Geography teacher and Head of Boys Cricket at Royal Grammar School Worcester.
