= ECB National Club Cricket Championship =

English limited overs knockout club cricket competition

The ECB National Club Cricket Championship is a forty over limited overs knockout club cricket competition in England. The most successful clubs have been Scarborough, from North Yorkshire, with five titles and Old Hill, from Staffordshire, with four. The current holders are Shepherd’s Bush Cricket Club, from Middlesex

The competition was originally only open to "senior" cricket sides (sides playing in the senior county leagues) and in 1972 the National Village Cup competition was formed for village sides unable to enter this competition. In 1997 the ECB released a blueprint to the future of cricket written by Lord MacLaurin called "Raising the Standards", the report suggested counties created county board ran leagues, designed to raise the standard of club cricket and bridge the gap between Club and county cricket. This led to the creation of the ECB Premier Leagues. Preference for entry to the competition was given to clubs in ECB Premier Leagues, although lower-level clubs are able to take part if they can be accommodated.

The format has largely stayed the same from the initial season to the present day. All teams are split into 16 regional knockouts, with the 16 winners going into a national round.

== Winners ==
- 1969: Hampstead
- 1970: Cheltenham
- 1971: Blackheath
- 1972: Scarborough
- 1973: Wolverhampton
- 1974: Sunbury
- 1975: York
- 1976: Scarborough
- 1977: Southgate
- 1978: Cheltenham
- 1979: Scarborough
- 1980: Moseley
- 1981: Scarborough
- 1982: Scarborough
- 1983: Shrewsbury
- 1984: Old Hill
- 1985: Old Hill
- 1986: Stourbridge
- 1987: Old Hill
- 1988: Enfield (Middlesex)
- 1989: Teddington
- 1990: Blackpool
- 1991: Teddington
- 1992: Optimists
- 1993: Old Hill
- 1994: Chorley
- 1995: Chorley
- 1996: Walsall
- 1997: Eastbourne
- 1998: Doncaster Town
- 1999: Wolverhampton
- 2000: Sheffield Collegiate
- 2001: Bramhall
- 2002: Saffron Walden
- 2003: Sandiacre Town
- 2004: Kibworth
- 2005: Horsham
- 2006: South Northumberland
- 2007: Bromley
- 2008: Kibworth
- 2009: Chester-le-Street
- 2010: South Northumberland
- 2011: Shrewsbury
- 2012: York
- 2013: West Indian Cavaliers
- 2014: Sandiacre Town
- 2015: Blackheath
- 2016: South Northumberland
- 2017: Wanstead and Snaresbrook
- 2018: Richmondshire
- 2019: Swardeston
- 2020: no competition
- 2021: Bath
- 2022: Bexley
- 2023: Cuckney
- 2024: Brentwood
- 2025: Ormskirk
- 2026: Shepherd's Bush

== Competition name ==
Due to sponsorship, the competition has been known by the following names:

Period	Name
1969–1975	DH Robins Cup
1976–1982	John Haig Trophy
1983–1986	William Younger Cup
1987–1990	Cockspur Cup
1991–1992	Club Cricket Championship
1993–1998	Abbot Ale Cup
1999–2000	Club Cricket Championship
2001–2002	Club Cricket Championship - sponsored by play-cricket.com
2003	Club Cricket Championship
2004–2008	Cockspur Cup
2009–2012	ECB National Club Championship
2013–present	Rothesay ECB National Club Championship

== See also ==
- Village cricket
