= Kidderminster Cricket Club =

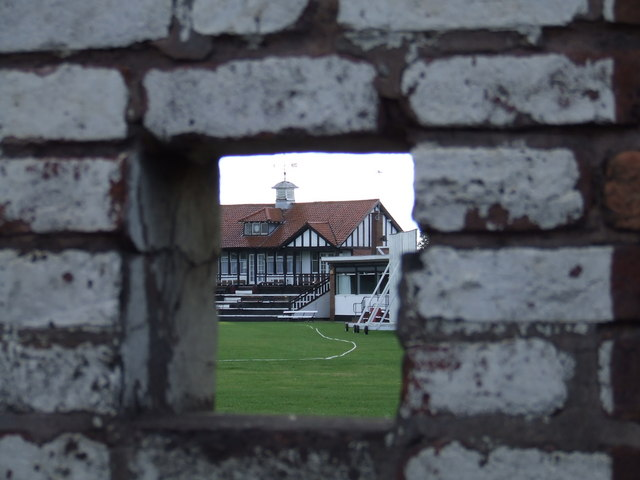
Kidderminster Cricket Club

Kidderminster Cricket Club is a cricket club in Kidderminster, Worcestershire, England. Their 1st and 2nd XIs currently play in the Birmingham and District Premier League Premier Division. Their 3rd, 4th and 5th XIs play in the Worcestershire County Cricket League. The club play their home games at Chester Road, a venue which has also hosted Worcestershire County Cricket Club matches. Kidderminster are one of the longest-serving members of the Birmingham and District League, having joined in 1895. They won the Division 1 title in 1899, 1901, 1924, 1929, 1946, 1950, 1962 and 1975. They also shared the Division 1 title in 1966 and 1973.

A cricket club has existed in the town since at least 1850. In 2003 Kidderminster Cricket Club, which had been a member of the Birmingham Cricket League for many years, amalgamated with Victoria & Blakeley Hall Cricket Club to become the Kidderminster Victoria Cricket Club it is known as today.

In 2016 the club reverted to its original name after the sponsorship deal with Victoria Carpets ended.
