= Old Hill Cricket Club =

Cricket club in England

Team information
- Founded: 1884
- Home ground: Haden Hill Ground
- Official website: www.oldhillcc.co.uk

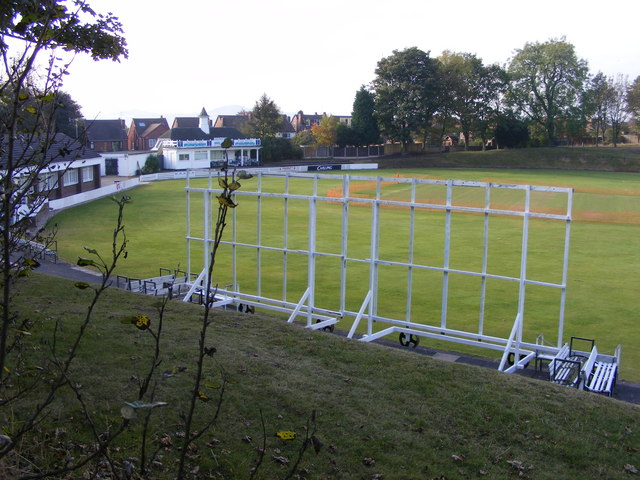
Old Hill Cricket Club's ground at Haden Hill

Old Hill Cricket Club is a cricket club in Cradley Heath, West Midlands, England.

== History ==
The club was founded in 1884 as Haden Hill Victoria, and has played on the Haden Hill ground in Cradley Heath since founding, having purchased it in 1934. The ground is owned by a Trust and shared with Old Hill Tennis Club. Historically the club was situated in the County of Staffordshire although boundary changes at one time placed it within the ambit of Worcestershire. It is for this reason that there is a joint affiliation with the Staffordshire and Worcestershire Cricket Boards.

Old Hill joined the Birmingham League in 1920, and first won the league in its second year of membership. The club also won the Division 1 title in 1940, 1960, and 1983. The 1st XI currently competes in the Birmingham & District Premier division 2 and the 2nd XI play in WCL Division 4. The 3rd XI meanwhile plays in WCL Division 8 (North). They are one of the most prominent clubs in English cricket, winning the ECB National Club Cricket Championship in 1984, 1985, 1987 and 1993, and being runners-up in 1989.

== Teams ==
The club currently runs three Saturday XIs. The Club's second and third XIs compete in the Worcestershire County League, while the 1st XI compete in the Birmingham & District premier league.

In addition during the recent years major steps have been taken to initiate a girls’ section within the club, with a women's team representing the club for the first time in 2004. In 2005, the girls under-13 team. the girls won the national Lady Taverners girls' championship; beating Bath in the final. As a result of this win, the team was named BBC Midlands Sports Personality of the Year junior team winners 2005.
