= Birmingham & District Premier Cricket League =

ECB Premier League

- Countries: England
- Format: Limited Overs
- First edition: 1888
- Tournament format: League
- Number of teams: 12 (Premier Division)
- Current champion: Knowle & Dorridge CC
- Most successful: Moseley CC and Walsall CC (22 titles each)
- Website: https://birminghamleague.org

The Birmingham & District Premier Cricket League is the oldest club cricket league in the United Kingdom, formed in 1888. It was the first ECB Premier League, being designated such in 1998, and is one of the strongest of the ECB Premier Leagues.

== Geography ==
The Birmingham League traditionally covered North Worcestershire, South Staffordshire and North Warwickshire, much of which is now the conurbation of the West Midlands. Since 1998, with the introduction of the ECB Premier Leagues, the pyramid system, and feeder leagues in the four counties (Shropshire Premier Cricket League, Staffordshire Club Cricket Championship, Warwickshire Cricket League and Worcestershire County Cricket League), the catchment of the league has spread to include the whole of Shropshire, Worcestershire and Warwickshire, as well as a large part of Staffordshire, although North Staffordshire clubs play in the North Staffordshire and South Cheshire League. Herefordshire clubs, who play in the Worcestershire County Cricket League, can also be promoted into the league.

== History ==
The Birmingham and District Cricket League is the oldest club competition in the United Kingdom, beginning league matches in 1888. The Birmingham and District Cricket Association had actually formed eight years earlier in 1880, but only ran a successful, if not controversial, cup competition for those first few years. On Friday 30 November 1888, representatives from local cricket clubs gathered at the Queen's Arms Hotel, Easy Row, Birmingham and went about setting up the first Club Cricket League in the UK, being inspired by the success The Birmingham County Football Association had had in organising local football competition and fixtures. With some representatives needing to consult their own committees before pledging their commitment to the league, and one or two prominent local clubs not being present, it was not until a second meeting on Friday 14 December 1888 that the league was actually, officially formed. There were initially seven clubs who decided to trial the league format the following season. They were:

- Aston Unity
- Handsworth Wood
- Kings Heath
- Mitchells
- Salters
- Walsall
- West Bromwich Dartmouth

Those early days saw many changes in the league's club make-up: Kings Heath moved to "The Reddings" Ground, joining with Moseley Cricket Club (and taking on that name). Another Kings Heath Club was formed later, but never became part of the Birmingham League set-up until the restructuring of Midlands Club cricket in 1998. Salters Cricket Club who played in Roebuck Lane, West Bromwich, and originated from the Spring Works of the same name, resigned from the league after just one season. In 1890, Wednesbury Cricket Club joined the league. In 1891, Smethwick Cricket Club, who had been involved in the Birmingham and District Cricket Association Cup competition in the 1880s, entered the league. Mitchells Cricket Club left the league between 1892 and 1896, due to some friction surrounding ineligible players, but shortly after they returned, they became Mitchells and Butlers Cricket Club when the two breweries amalgamated in 1898. In 1892, Small Heath Cricket Club joined the league and although their ground was amongst the best in the competition, the club was out of its depth in other aspects, and they resigned from the league 3 years later. In 1894, Warwickshire County Cricket Club entered the league after years of deliberation, but withdrew again in 1895 after being admitted to the County Championship. Over the next few years, the league's influence moved to the west, with Dudley Cricket Club joining the League in 1893, Stourbridge in 1894 and Kidderminster in 1895. Handsworth Wood who had performed creditably in the league until their Browne's Green ground was acquired by developers shortly after the First World War, spent one season playing at the County Ground, Edgbaston, but when no new ground could be found the following season either, they lost a narrow motion by the league (by one vote), and Old Hill Cricket Club replaced them in 1920. The Handsworth Wood Club folded shortly afterwards, handing their cash balance over to the league benevolent fund.

The second XI competition, perhaps stronger than any of the lower level 1st XI competitions which existed in the region until the restructuring of 1998, was formed in 1893. The league was suspended for the First World War between 1914 and 1918, but continued to play through the Second World War, and the League, now comprising 10 clubs (Aston Unity, Dudley, Kidderminster, Mitchells and Butlers, Moseley, Old Hill, Smethwick, Stourbridge, Walsall, West Bromwich Dartmouth), stayed the same until 1975. In 1975, the league expanded again as Warwickshire and Worcestershire decided the strength of the league could be utilised. Warwickshire entered a 1st and 2nd XI (basically a 1st/2nd team side and a 2nd/colts side), whilst Worcestershire only entered a 1st XI and Duport Cricket Club (A Dudley-based Furniture making company club) played their 2nd XI fixtures. Whilst Warwickshire established themselves in the competition and won it on a few occasions, Worcestershire struggled, and two years later, Duport took on their 1st XI fixtures too, as they were forced to pull out of the league. Duport also struggled with the on-field standards, and when support from the company's Social Club was reduced they too were forced to pull out of the competition, and were replaced by another Worcester-based side in 1982, Worcester City. Many other changes took place in the league throughout the 1980s and 1990s, and they are summarised below:

| Year | Outgoing Club | Reason | Incoming Club |
|---|---|---|---|
| 1977 | Worcestershire | Struggled to field sides due to small County staff | Duport |
| 1982 | Duport | Works Social Club decreased funding and club struggled with the standard of cricket | Worcester City |
| 1985 | Dudley | Ground caved in and club was forced to fold | Coventry and North Warwicks |
| 1990 | Warwickshire | Struggled to commit to League cricket with increased County 2nd XI programme | Wolverhampton |
| 1992 | Worcester City | Club folded | Stratford |
| 1995 | Mitchells and Butlers | Brewery decided to sell off ground so club folded | Barnt Green |

In 1998 the Birmingham League included Promotion & relegation for the first time. The 12 teams of the Birmingham League formed the Premier Division, The 2 other big leagues (Midlands Combined Counties League & Midlands Club Cricket League) formed the lower divisions. Teams increased over time to 48 (4 1st XI divisions of 12 clubs: Premier, Division 1, Division 2 and Division 3, with accompanying 2nd XI divisions: Premier, Division 1, Division 2 West and Division 2 East). In 2017, under pressure from the ECB, the league's clubs voted to cut the league down to 2 divisions of 12 by 2019, and disband the 2nd XI competition.

== ECB Premier League ==
Since being designated an ECB Premier League in 1998, the first in the country, several changes have occurred in the league's structure. Initially, the 12 clubs in the old Birmingham League made up the Premier Division, and a First Division, Second Division East and Second Division West were made up from clubs in the old Midlands Combined Counties League, the Worcestershire League, the Warwickshire League and the Staffs League. The Second Division East and Second Division West were later replaced by a Second Division and a Third Division.

Only one club was promoted in the first year of the new structure, which was Cannock while Aston Unity, a founder member of the league, were the first club to be relegated. Since 1999, two clubs have been relegated and two promoted each season.

Following the 2018 season the Second and Third divisions were abolished, along with all four 2nd XI divisions, and the league was reduced to two divisions. The relegated 1st and 2nd XIs now compete in the four West Midland county feeder leagues.

The winners of the four feeder leagues now enter a ‘round robin’ playoff at the end of each season with the top two teams being promoted (replacing the two relegated sides from Premier Division Two) and the bottom two going back to their feeder leagues.

== Clubs for 2026 ==
For the 2026 season, the clubs in Premier Division One are: Barnards Green, Barnt Green, Dorridge, Halesowen, Harborne, Himley, Kenilworth Wardens, Knowle & Dorridge, Moseley, Ombersley, Shrewsbury, Smethwick, .

The clubs in Premier Division Two are: Attock, Berkswell, Kidderminster, Leamington Spa, Milford Hall, Old Hill, Shifnal, Stourbridge, Tamworth, West Bromwich Dartmouth, Wolverhampton, Worfield.

Across the two divisions, the league currently comprises:

8 Warwickshire clubs (Attock, Berkswell, Dorridge, Harborne, Kenilworth Wardens, Knowle & Dorridge, Leamington Spa, Moseley)

7 Staffordshire clubs (Himley, Milford Hall, Old Hill, Smethwick, Tamworth, West Bromwich Dartmouth, Wolverhampton)

6 Worcestershire clubs (Barnards Green, Barnt Green, Halesowen, Kidderminster, Ombersley, Stourbridge)

3 Shropshire clubs (Shifnal, Shrewsbury, Worfield).

== Winners ==
| Year | Champions |
|---|---|
| 1889 | Aston Unity |
| 1890 | Moseley and West Bromwich Dartmouth* |
| 1891 | Moseley |
| 1892 | Handsworth Wood |
| 1893 | Walsall |
| 1894 | Aston Unity |
| 1895 | Moseley |
| 1896 | Walsall and Aston Unity* |
| 1897 | Handsworth Wood |
| 1898 | Dudley |
| 1899 | Kidderminster |
| 1900 | Aston Unity |
| 1901 | Kidderminster |
| 1902 | Handsworth Wood |
| 1903 | Handsworth Wood |
| 1904 | Moseley |
| 1905 | Aston Unity and Handsworth Wood* |
| 1906 | Aston Unity |
| 1907 | Moseley |
| 1908 | Moseley |

| Year | Champions |
|---|---|
| 1909 | Moseley and Mitchells and Butlers* |
| 1910 | Aston Unity and Dudley* |
| 1911 | Mitchells and Butlers |
| 1912 | Walsall |
| 1913 | Dudley |
| 1914 | Mitchells and Butlers |
| 1915 | League suspended |
| 1916 | League suspended |
| 1917 | League suspended |
| 1918 | League suspended |
| 1919 | Stourbridge |
| 1920 | Moseley |
| 1921 | Old Hill |
| 1922 | Walsall |
| 1923 | Moseley |
| 1924 | Kidderminster |
| 1925 | Mitchells and Butlers |
| 1926 | Mitchells and Butlers |
| 1927 | Aston Unity |
| 1928 | Mitchells and Butlers |

| Year | Champions |
|---|---|
| 1929 | Kidderminster |
| 1930 | West Bromwich Dartmouth |
| 1931 | Mitchells and Butlers |
| 1932 | West Bromwich Dartmouth |
| 1933 | West Bromwich Dartmouth and Walsall* |
| 1934 | West Bromwich Dartmouth |
| 1935 | Walsall |
| 1936 | Walsall |
| 1937 | Walsall |
| 1938 | Moseley |
| 1939 | Aston Unity and Mitchells and Butlers |
| 1940 | Old Hill |
| 1941 | West Bromwich Dartmouth |
| 1942 | West Bromwich Dartmouth |
| 1943 | West Bromwich Dartmouth |
| 1944 | West Bromwich Dartmouth |
| 1945 | West Bromwich Dartmouth |
| 1946 | Kidderminster |
| 1947 | Mitchells and Butlers |
| 1948 | West Bromwich Dartmouth |

| Year | Champions |
|---|---|
| 1949 | Aston Unity |
| 1950 | Kidderminster |
| 1951 | Smethwick |
| 1952 | Dudley |
| 1953 | West Bromwich Dartmouth |
| 1954 | Mitchells and Butlers |
| 1955 | West Bromwich Dartmouth |
| 1956 | Moseley |
| 1957 | Dudley |
| 1958 | West Bromwich Dartmouth |
| 1959 | Moseley |
| 1960 | Old Hill |
| 1961 | Moseley |
| 1962 | Kidderminster |
| 1963 | Moseley |
| 1964 | Moseley |
| 1965 | West Bromwich Dartmouth |
| 1966 | Kidderminster and Walsall* |
| 1967 | Moseley |
| 1968 | Smethwick |

| Year | Champions |
|---|---|
| 1969 | Moseley |
| 1970 | Moseley |
| 1971 | West Bromwich Dartmouth |
| 1972 | Walsall |
| 1973 | Kidderminster and Moseley |
| 1974 | West Bromwich Dartmouth |
| 1975 | Kidderminster |
| 1976 | Walsall |
| 1977 | Aston Unity |
| 1978 | Warwickshire |
| 1979 | Warwickshire |
| 1980 | Walsall |
| 1981 | Dudley |
| 1982 | Walsall |
| 1983 | Old Hill |
| 1984 | Moseley |
| 1985 | Moseley |
| 1986 | Walsall |
| 1987 | Stourbridge |
| 1988 | Warwickshire |

| Year | Champions |
|---|---|
| 1989 | Stourbridge |
| 1990 | Wolverhampton |
| 1991 | Coventry and North Warwickshire |
| 1992 | Walsall |
| 1993 | West Bromwich Dartmouth |
| 1994 | Walsall |
| 1995 | Barnt Green |
| 1996 | Walsall |
| 1997 | Barnt Green |
| 1998 | Wolverhampton |
| 1999 | Walsall |
| 2000 | Cannock |
| 2001 | Stratford upon Avon |
| 2002 | Halesowen |
| 2003 | Wellington |
| 2004 | Wellington |
| 2005 | Barnt Green |
| 2006 | Walsall |
| 2007 | Walsall |
| 2008 | Walsall |

| Year | Champions |
|---|---|
| 2009 | Knowle and Dorridge |
| 2010 | Shrewsbury |
| 2011 | Barnt Green |
| 2012 | Walsall |
| 2013 | Shrewsbury |
| 2014 | West Bromwich Dartmouth |
| 2015 | Shrewsbury |
| 2016 | Berkswell |
| 2017 | Knowle and Dorridge |
| 2018 | Berkswell |
| 2019 | Berkswell |
| 2020 | no competition |
| 2021 | Berkswell |
| 2022 | Smethwick |
| 2023 | Moseley |
| 2024 | Smethwick |
| 2025 | Smethwick |
| 2026 | Knowle and Dorridge |

- * – denotes a shared title

=== Championships won ===
- Clubs still in the League
  | Wins | Club |
  | 22 | Moseley (Note: Moseley have 3 shared titles.) |
  | 22 | Walsall (Note: Walsall have 3 shared titles.) |
  | 19 | West Bromwich Dartmouth (Note: West Bromwich Dartmouth have 2 shared titles.) |
  | 10 | Kidderminster (Note: Kidderminster have 2 shared titles.) |
  | 5 | Smethwick |
  | 4 | Barnt Green |
  | 4 | Berkswell |
  | 3 | Knowle & Dorridge |
  | 3 | Shrewsbury |
  | 2 | Wolverhampton |
  | 1 | Coventry and North Warwickshire |
  | 1 | Halesowen |
- Clubs no longer in the League
  | Wins | Club |
  | 8 | Mitchells & Butlers (Note: Mitchells & Butlers have 2 shared titles.) |
  | 6 | Aston Unity (Note: Aston Unity have 3 shared titles.) |
  | 6 | Dudley (Note: Dudley have 2 shared titles.) |
  | 4 | Handsworth Wood (Note: Handsworth Wood have 1 shared title.) |
  | 4 | Old Hill |
  | 3 | Stourbridge |
  | 3 | Warwickshire |
  | 2 | Wellington |
  | 1 | Cannock |
  | 1 | Stratford upon Avon |

== Performance by season from 1998 ==
Key
| Gold | Champions |
| Red | Relegated |
| Blue | Left League |

Performance by season, from 1998
| Club | 1998 | 1999 | 2000 | 2001 | 2002 | 2003 | 2004 | 2005 | 2006 | 2007 | 2008 | 2009 | 2010 | 2011 | 2012 | 2013 | 2014 | 2015 | 2016 | 2017 | 2018 | 2019 | 2021 | 2022 | 2023 | 2024 | 2025 | 2026 |
|---|---|---|---|---|---|---|---|---|---|---|---|---|---|---|---|---|---|---|---|---|---|---|---|---|---|---|---|---|
| Aston Unity | 12 | | | | 9 | 12 | | | | | | | | | | | | | | | | | | | | | | |
| Barnards Green | | | | | | | | | | | | | | | | | | | | | | | | | 10 | 3 | 7 | 6 |
| Barnt Green | 4 | ? | 7 | 7 | 5 | 2 | 2 | 1 | 9 | 7 | 4 | 8 | 4 | 1 | 8 | 8 | 2 | 8 | 8 | 5 | 8 | 3 | 5 | 2 | 6 | 5 | 6 | 5 |
| Berkswell | | | | | | | | | | | | | | | 4 | 6 | 3 | 2 | 1 | 3 | 1 | 1 | 1 | 5 | 9 | 4 | 12 | |
| Brockhampton | | | | | | | | | | | | | | | 7 | 2 | 7 | 11 | | 12 | | | | | | | | |
| Bromsgrove | | | | | | | | | | | | 12 | | | | | | | | | | | | | | | | |
| Cannock | | ? | 1 | 8 | 4 | 9 | 12 | | | | | | | | | | | | | | | | | | | | | |
| Coventry & North Warwickshire | 8 | ? | 6 | 10 | 10 | 10 | 7 | 7 | 8 | 12 | | | | | | | | | | | | | | | | | | |
| Dorridge | | | | | | | | | | | | | | | | | 6 | 12 | | 7 | 9 | 11 | | | | | | 10 |
| Halesowen | | | 4 | 2 | 1 | 4 | 8 | 11 | | | | | | | | | | | | | | | | 8 | 4 | 2 | 2 | 3 |
| Harborne | | | 11 | | | | | | | | | | | | | | | | | | | | | | | | 8 | 8 |
| Himley | | | | | 2 | 8 | 4 | 2 | 4 | 3 | 2 | 5 | 6 | 3 | 2 | 4 | 12 | | | | | | | | | 6 | 10 | 7 |
| Kenilworth Wardens | | | | | | | | 5 | 3 | 9 | 9 | 4 | 11 | | | | 9 | 9 | 5 | 9 | 10 | 12 | | 4 | 5 | 13 | | 12 |
| Kidderminster (Note: Kidderminster were called Kidderminster Victoria until 2015.) | 10 | ? | 8 | 12 | | | | | 10 | 5 | 7 | 7 | 3 | 9 | 5 | 5 | 8 | 4 | 2 | 11 | | 7 | 3 | 10 | 12 | | | |
| Knowle and Dorridge | | | | 4 | 7 | 3 | 3 | 6 | 7 | 2 | 3 | 1 | 2 | 5 | 10 | 3 | 5 | 3 | 4 | 1 | 2 | 5 | 4 | 7 | 2 | 7 | 3 | 1 |
| Leamington | | | | | | | | 12 | | | 10 | 11 | | 8 | 11 | | | | 12 | | | | 2 | 12 | | | | |
| Moseley | 5 | ? | | | 3 | 7 | 5 | 10 | 5 | 10 | 8 | 10 | 9 | 11 | | | | | | | 6 | 8 | 8 | 3 | 1 | 9 | 9 | 11 |
| Old Hill | 9 | ? | 5 | 3 | 6 | 6 | 6 | 3 | 11 | | | | | | | | | | | | | | | | | | | |
| Ombersley | | | | | | | | | | | | | | | | | | 6 | 6 | 4 | 11 | | 10 | 6 | 7 | 10 | 5 | 4 |
| Shifnal | | | | | | | | | | 4 | 12 | | | | | | | | | | | 4 | 7 | 11 | | | | |
| Shrewsbury | | | | | | 12 | | | 12 | | | 6 | 1 | 4 | 6 | 1 | 4 | 1 | 3 | 2 | 5 | 2 | 6 | 9 | 11 | | 4 | 9 |
| Smethwick | 11 | ? | 12 | | | | | | | | | | 8 | 12 | | | | | | | 4 | 9 | 9 | 1 | 3 | 1 | 1 | 2 |
| Stourbridge | 7 | ? | | | | | | | | | | | | | | | | | | | | | | | | | | |
| Stratford upon Avon | 6 | ? | 2 | 1 | 11 | | | | | | | | | | | | | | | | | | | | | | | |
| Walmley | | | | | | | | | | 8 | 6 | 3 | 12 | | | 10 | 10 | 7 | 11 | | | | | | | | | |
| Walsall | 2 | 1 | 3 | 5 | 8 | 5 | 10 | 8 | 1 | 1 | 1 | 9 | 10 | 7 | 1 | 7 | 11 | | 10 | 10 | 7 | 6 | 11 | | | | | |
| Water Orton | | | | | | | 11 | | | | | | | | | | | | | | | | | | | | | |
| Wellington | | | | | | 1 | 1 | 9 | 6 | 11 | | | 5 | 2 | 12 | | | | | | | | | | | | | |
| West Bromwich Dartmouth | 3 | ? | 9 | 11 | | | 9 | 4 | 2 | 6 | 11 | | | 10 | 9 | 9 | 1 | 5 | 9 | 6 | 3 | 10 | 12 | | | 12 | | |
| Wolverhampton | 1 | ? | 10 | 6 | 9 | 11 | | | | | 5 | 2 | 7 | 6 | 3 | 11 | | 10 | 7 | 8 | 12 | | | | 8 | 8 | 11 | |
| Wombourne | | | | | | | | | | | | | | | | 12 | | | | | | | | | | | | |
| References | | | | | | | | | | | | | | | | | | | | | | | | | | | | |

== National Knockout ==
The Birmingham and District Cricket League's strength as a competition has been proven throughout the years, by the presence of its clubs in the latter stages of the ECB National Club Cricket Championship (a cup Competition for all Clubs in the UK). Here are a list of clubs in the league structure who have won or been runners-up in the competition:

| Club | Year | Opponents | Winners/Runners-up |
|---|---|---|---|
| Wolverhampton | 1973 | The Mote (Kent) | Winners |
| Moseley | 1980 | Gosport Borough (Hampshire) | Winners |
| Shrewsbury | 1983 | Hastings and St Leonards Priory (Sussex) | Winners |
| Old Hill | 1984 | Bishop's Stortford (Hertfordshire) | Winners |
| Old Hill | 1985 | Reading (Berkshire) | Winners |
| Stourbridge | 1986 | Weston-super-Mare (Somerset) | Winners |
| Old Hill | 1987 | Teddington (Middlesex) | Winners |
| Wolverhampton | 1988 | Enfield (Middlesex) | Runners-up |
| Old Hill | 1989 | Teddington (Middlesex) | Runners-up(replay) |
| Walsall | 1991 | Teddington (Middlesex) | Runners-up |
| Old Hill | 1993 | West Bromwich Dartmouth (Staffordshire) | Winners |
| West Bromwich Dartmouth | 1993 | Old Hill (Staffordshire) | Runners-up |
| Walsall | 1996 | Chorley (Lancashire) | Winners |
| Wolverhampton | 1999 | Teddington (Middlesex) | Winners |
| Barnt Green | 2002 | Saffron Walden (Essex) | Runners-up |
| Barnt Green | 2005 | Horsham (Sussex) | Runners-up |
| Shrewsbury | 2011 | Cambridge Granta (Cambridgeshire) | Winners |

== Famous players, and B&DPCL Club(s) represented ==
Many international players have played in the Birmingham League over the years:

=== England Players ===
- Tom Banton Barnt Green
- Kabir Ali Smethwick, West Bromwich Dartmouth, C & R Hawks
- Moeen Ali Moseley Ashfield, Smethwick, Water Orton, West Bromwich Dartmouth, Wolverhampton
- Dennis Amiss
- Ted Arnold
- Sydney Barnes
- Charles Barnett
- Ian Bell Coventry & North Warwickshire, Knowle & Dorridge
- Joey Benjamin Mitchells & Butlers
- David Brown
- Usman Afzaal
- Dougie Brown Barnt Green
- Pat Brown Barnards Green, Dorridge, Kenilworth Wardens, Kidderminster, West Bromwich Dartmouth
- Freddie Calthorpe
- Nobby Clark West Bromwich Dartmouth
- Geoff Cook
- Nick Cook West Bromwich Dartmouth
- Tim Curtis Kidderminster, West Bromwich Dartmouth
- Steve Davies Himley, Kidderminster
- Phil DeFreitas Aston Manor
- Basil D'Oliveira Kidderminster
- Tom Dollery
- Jack Flavell Stourbridge, Walsall
- Frank Foster
- Reginald "Tip" Foster Stourbridge
- Alfred "Tich" Freeman
- Bruce French
- Jason Gallian Wolverhampton
- Norman Gifford Dudley
- Tom Goddard
- Alf Gover West Bromwich Dartmouth
- Tom Graveney Dudley
- Dean Headley Old Hill
- Eddie Hemmings
- Graeme Hick Kidderminster
- Robin Hobbs Duport
- Eric Hollies Old Hill, West Bromwich Dartmouth
- Martin Horton Stourbridge
- Harry Howell
- Dick Howorth Old Hill, Stourbridge, Walsall
- Geoff Humpage Moseley Ashfield
- Kenneth Hutchings
- Richard Illingworth Barnt Green, Old Elizabethans, Worcester City
- John Jameson
- Roly Jenkins West Bromwich Dartmouth
- Arthur Jones
- Don Kenyon Stourbridge
- Sep Kinneir
- David Larter
- Wayne Larkins Leamington
- Dick Lilley
- Andy Lloyd
- Darren Maddy Berkswell, Leamington Spa
- Jim McConnon
- Tim Munton Warwickshire
- Phil Newport Kidderminster
- Morris Nichols
- Alan Oakman
- George Paine
- Charles Palmer Old Hill
- Reg Perks Dudley, Kidderminster, West Bromwich Dartmouth
- Kevin Pietersen Cannock
- Dick Pollard
- Willie Quaife
- Neal Radford Evesham, Stratford-upon-Avon
- Steve Rhodes
- Dick Richardson Old Hill, Stourbridge
- Peter Richardson Stourbridge
- Fred Root Dudley
- Fred Rumsey Kidderminster
- George Scrimshaw Kidderminster, Kenilworth Wardens
- Frank Smailes
- Gladstone Small Knowle & Dorridge
- Mike Smith
- Neil Smith Leamington
- Peter Smith West Bromwich Dartmouth
- Vikram Solanki Wolverhampton
- David Steele West Bromwich Dartmouth
- Olly Stone Barnt Green
- Maurice Tate
- Roy Tattersall Kidderminster
- James Taylor Kidderminster, Shrewsbury
- Les Taylor West Bromwich Dartmouth
- Jonathan Trott Harborne
- Jim Troughton Stratford-upon-Avon
- Abe Waddington West Bromwich Dartmouth
- Arthur Wellard
- David "Butch" White
- Bob Willis
- Chris Woakes Walmley
- Bob Wyatt Moseley
- Samit Patel Knowle and Dorridge

=== Australia ===
- Greg Matthews Old Hill
- Tom Moody
- Simon O'Donnell Stourbridge
- Chris Rogers Wellington
- Steve Waugh Smethwick
- Graham Yallop Walsall
- Beau Webster knowle and Dorridge

=== South Africa ===
- Marques Ackerman Knowle & Dorridge
- Peter Carlstein Old Hill
- Allan Donald Knowle & Dorridge
- Clive Eksteen Old Hill
- JP Fellows-Smith West Bromwich Dartmouth
- Anthonie Ferreira (Unofficial)
- Zubayr Hamza Wolverhampton
- Claude Henderson
- Ryan McLaren Knowle & Dorridge
- Brian McMillan Moseley
- Senuran Muthusamy Brockhampton
- Hugh Page (Unofficial)
- Sid Pegler
- Roy Pienaar Kidderminster
- Dewald Pretorius Moseley
- Mike Rindel Smethwick, West Bromwich Dartmouth
- Jason Smith Ombersley
- Herbie Taylor
- Thami Tsolekile Coventry & North Warwickshire
- Raynard van Tonder Halesowen

=== West Indies ===
- Fabian Allen Worcester
- Nkrumah Bonner Handsworth
- Carlos Brathwaite Knowle & Dorridge
- Colin Croft
- Shane Dowrich Leamington Spa
- George Headley
- Ron Headley Dudley, Old Hill, Stourbridge
- Vanburn Holder West Bromwich Dartmouth
- Alvin Kallicharan
- Collis King
- Frank King West Bromwich Dartmouth
- Lincoln Roberts Himley
- Alfred Scott West Bromwich Dartmouth
- Phil Simmons Wellington
- Jeremy Solozano Dorridge
- Dwayne Smith Kington
- Jerome Taylor Barnards Green
- Alf Valentine

=== New Zealand ===
- Ian Butler Harborne
- Stewie Dempster
- Martin Donnelly
- Jamie How Walsall
- Warren Lees
- Bill Merritt
- Jimmy Neesham West Bromwich Dartmouth
- Michael Papps Walsall
- John Parker Kidderminster
- Dipak Patel Dudley, West Bromwich Dartmouth
- Barry Sinclair
- Don Taylor West Bromwich Dartmouth
- Glenn Turner Stourbridge
- Roger Twose West Bromwich Dartmouth
- George Worker Knowle & Dorridge

=== India ===
- Sairaj Bahutule Wolverhampton
- Shiv Sunder Das Harborne
- Dilip Doshi Walsall
- Wasim Jaffer Himley
- Amar Singh

=== Pakistan ===
- Abid Ali West Bromwich Dartmouth
- Azhar Mahmood Smethwick
- Imran Khan Stourbridge
- Mohammad Akram Smethwick
- Mohammad Yousuf Smethwick, Evesham
- Mushtaq Mohammad Old Hill
- Saqlain Mushtaq Evesham
- Sadiq Mohammad
- Saad Naseem Old Hill
- Shahid Saeed Evesham
- Shoaib Akhtar Berkswell
- Usama Mir Barnards Green
- Wasim Akram Smethwick, Aston Unity
- Tayyab Tahir Smethwick
- Yasir Ali Smethwick

=== Sri Lanka ===
- Dinusha Fernando Brockhampton
- Somachandra de Silva West Bromwich Dartmouth
- Champaka Ramanayake West Bromwich Dartmouth
- Malinda Warnapura Halesowen

=== Zimbabwe ===
- Tendai Chisoro Fordhouses
- Dion Ebrahim West Bromwich Dartmouth
- Andy Flower West Bromwich Dartmouth
- Grant Flower Barnt Green
- Travis Friend Knowle & Dorridge
- Trevor Garwe Wellington
- David Houghton West Bromwich Dartmouth
- Dougie Marillier Bedworth, Kenilworth Wardens
- Gus Mackay Barnt Green, West Bromwich Dartmouth
- Mpumelelo Mbangwa Coventry & North Warwickshire
- Waddington Mwayenga Worcester
- Edward Rainsford Berkswell
- Paul Strang Barnt Green
- Tatenda Taibu Worcester
- Mark Vermeulen Fordhouses
- Dirk Viljoen Barnt Green

=== Bangladesh ===
- Enamul Haque Jr Wolverhampton
- Abu Jayed Barnards Green

=== Ireland ===
- Mark Adair Harborne, Moseley
- Boyd Rankin Moseley (also played test cricket for England)

=== ICC Associate Nation ODI Players ===
==== Namibia ====
- Jan-Berry Burger Knowle and Dorridge
- Gerrie Snyman Tamworth, Walsall
- Christi Viljeon Aston Manor

==== Netherlands ====
- Ben Cooper Stratford-upon-Avon
- Tim Gruijters Walmley
- Alexei Kervezee Bromsgrove, Halesowen, Harborne

==== Scotland ====
- Navdeep Poonia Old Hill, West Bromwich Dartmouth
- Calum MacLeod Walmley
- Jasper Davidson Harborne
- Oliver Davidson Harborne
- Andrew Umeed Dorridge, Kings Heath, Moseley, West Bromwich Dartmouth

==== UAE ====
- Vriitya Aravind Ombersley, Stourbridge
