= List of Worcestershire County Cricket Club players =

This is a list in alphabetical order of cricketers who have played for Worcestershire County Cricket Club in top-class matches since 1899 when the club joined the County Championship and the team was elevated to official first-class status. Worcestershire has been classified as a List A team since the beginning of limited overs cricket in 1963 and as a top-level Twenty20 team since the inauguration of the Twenty20 Cup in 2003.

The details are the player's usual name followed by the years in which he was active as a Worcestershire player and then his name is given as it would appear on modern match scorecards. Note that many players represented other top-class teams besides Worcestershire and that some played for the club in minor counties cricket before 1899. Current players are shown as active to the latest season in which they played for the club. The list excludes Second XI and other players who did not play for the club's first team and players whose first team appearances were in minor matches only. The list has been updated to the end of the 2021 cricket season using the data published in Playfair Cricket Annual, 2022 edition.

As of 5 June 2025

== A ==
- Frederick Abbott (1919–1920) : F. J. Abbott
- Kyle Abbott (2016) : K. J. Abbott
- Abdul Hafeez (1998–1999) : Abdul Hafeez
- Abdul Razzaq (2007) : Abdul Razzaq
- George Abell (1923–1939) : G. E. B. Abell
- Frank Adshead (1927) : F. H. Adshead
- Stephen Adshead (2003) : S. J. Adshead
- William Adshead (1922–1928) : W. E. Adshead
- Frank Ahl (1931–1933) : F. D. Ahl
- Joe Ainley (1905–1906) : J. Ainley
- Michael Ainsworth (1948–1950) : M. L. Y. Ainsworth
- John Aldridge (1956–1960) : K. J. Aldridge
- Thomas Allchurch (1919–1920) : T. Allchurch
- Hartley Alleyne (1980–1982) : H. L. Alleyne
- Ben Allison (2023–2025) : B. M. J. Allison
- Mohammed Amjad (1996) : Mohammed Amjad (Note: Amjad was born in 1971 at Marston Green in Warwickshire and made a single first-class appearance against South Africa A in 1996, scoring eight runs. He had played Second XI cricket for Warwickshire, Derbyshire and Somerset as well as Worcestershire and went on to play Minor Counties cricket for Cornwall in 1998.)
- Gareth Andrew (2008–2015) : G. M. Andrew
- Aneesh Kapil (2010–2013) : Aneesh Kapil
- John Anton (1950) : J. H. H. Anton
- Alfred Archer (1900–1901) : A. G. Archer
- Edward Argent (1928) : E. A. Argent
- Ted Arnold (1899–1913) : E. G. Arnold
- John Ashman (1953–1954) : J. R. Ashman
- Gilbert Ashton (1922–1936) : G. Ashton
- Ravichandran Ashwin (2017) : R. Ashwin
- Bill Athey (1999) : C. W. J. Athey
- Harry Austin (1928) : H. Austin
- Azhar Ali (2022–2023) : Azhar Ali

== B ==
- Harold Bache (1907–1910) : H. G. Bache
- Edward Baker (1933–1934) : E. S. Baker
- Harold Baker (1911) : H. F. Baker
- Josh Baker (2021–2024) : J. O. Baker
- W. Baker (1920) : W. Baker (Note: Baker played twice for the county in 1920, both appearances coming in County Championship matches. Other than a surname and initial, no biographical details are known.)
- Ernest Bale (1908–1920) : E. W. Bale
- David Banks (1982–1985) : D. A. Banks
- Arthur Bannister (1900–1902) : A. F. Bannister
- Jacques Banton (2021–2022) : J. Banton
- Roy Barker (1964–1969) : A. R. P. Barker
- Jack Barley (1909) : J. C. Barley
- Ed Barnard (2015–2022) : E. G. Barnard
- Brian Barrett (1985) : B. J. Barrett
- Nathan Batson (1998–1999) : N. E. Batson
- Gareth Batty (2002–2009) : G. J. Batty
- Keith Baylis (1966–1967) : K. R. Baylis
- Edward Bayliss (1939) : E. G. Bayliss
- Kenny Benjamin (1993) : K. C. G. Benjamin
- Edwin Bennett (1925) : E. H. Bennett
- Hugh Bennett (1888–1901) : H. F. Bennett
- Norman Bennett (1946) : N. O. Bennett
- Paul Bent (1985–1991) : P. Bent
- Robert Berkeley (1919–1922) : R. G. W. Berkeley
- Bob Berry (1955–1958) : R. Berry
- Stuart Bevins (1989–1991) : S. R. Bevins
- Andy Bichel (2001–2004) : A. J. Bichel
- Albert Bird (1895–1909) : A. Bird
- Ronald Bird (1946–1954) : R. E. Bird
- Jack Birkenshaw (1981) : J. Birkenshaw
- George Blakey (1939) : G. M. Blakey
- Charles Blewitt (1912) : C. P. Blewitt
- Leonard Blunt (1945–1949) : L. Blunt
- Doug Bollinger (2007) : D. E. Bollinger
- Roy Booth (1956–1970) : R. Booth
- Ian Botham (1987–1991) : I. T. Botham
- Nicholas Boulton (2001) : N. R. Boulton
- Jack Bowles (1926–1928) : J. J. Bowles
- Frederick Bowley (1894–1923) : F. L. Bowley
- Cedric Boyns (1976–1979) : C. N. Boyns
- Michael Bracewell (2023) : M. G. Bracewell
- Michael Bradley (1951–1952) : M. E. Bradley
- Brian Brain (1959–1975) : B. M. Brain
- Dwayne Bravo (2022) : D. J. Bravo
- James Brinkley (1993–1997) : J. E. Brinkley
- Percival Brinton (1904) : P. R. Brinton
- Ronald Brinton (1924) : R. L. Brinton
- Reginald Brinton (1889–1909) : R. S. Brinton
- Bob Broadbent (1950–1963) : R. G. Broadbent
- Eliot Bromley-Martin (1884–1900) : E. G. Bromley-Martin
- Granville Bromley-Martin (1891–1904) : G. E. Bromley-Martin
- George Brook (1930–1935) : G. W. Brook
- Ethan Brookes (2024–2025): E. A. Brookes
- Jack Brooks (2023) : J. A. Brooks
- Alan Brown (1979) : A. Brown
- Patrick Brown (2017–2023) : P. R. Brown
- Eric Brownell (1908) : E. L. D. Brownell
- Edwin Bryant (1923–1925) : E. H. Bryant
- Charlie Bull (1931–1939) : C. H. Bull
- Syd Buller (1935–1946) : J. S. Buller
- Mark Bullock (1900) : M. Bullock
- Percy Bullock (1921) : P. G. Bullock
- Edward Bunting (1910–1922) : E. L. Bunting
- Arthur Burlton (1922) : A. T. Burlton
- William Burns (1902–1913) : W. B. Burns
- Frederick Burr (1910–1911) : F. B. Burr
- Robert Burrows (1893–1919) : R. D. Burrows
- Sydney Busher (1908–1910) : S. E. Busher
- George Byrne (1914–1921) : G. R. Byrne

== C ==
- William Caldwell (1901–1904) : W. S. Caldwell
- James Cameron (2010–2012) : J. G. Cameron
- Evelyn Carmichael (1889–1903) : E. G. M. Carmichael
- Austin Carr (1921–1925) : A. M. Carr
- Andrew Carter (2018) : A. Carter
- Bob Carter (1961–1972) : R. G. M. Carter
- Rodney Cass (1969–1975) : G. R. Cass
- Duncan Catterall (1998–2002) : D. N. Catterall
- Graeme Cessford (2013) : G. Cessford
- John Chadd (1955–1956) : J. E. Chadd
- Robert Chapman (1996–1998) : R. J. Chapman
- Charles Chatham (1934) : C. H. Chatham
- Frank Chester (1912–1914) : F. Chester
- George Chesterton (1950–1957) : G. H. Chesterton
- Shaaiq Choudhry (2013–2014) : S. H. Choudhry
- Matthew Church (1994–1996) : M. J. Church
- Thomas Clare (1920–1925) : T. Clare
- Joe Clarke (2015–2018): J. M. Clarke
- Alfred Cliff (1912–1920) : A. T. Cliff
- Josh Cobb (2024): J. J. Cobb
- Len Coldwell (1955–1969) : L. J. Coldwell
- Christopher Collier (1910–1914) : C. G. A. Collier
- John Collinson (1946) : J. Collinson
- Nick Compton (2013) : N. R. D. Compton
- Arthur Conway (1910–1919) : A. J. Conway
- Edwin Cooper (1936–1951) : E. Cooper
- Fred Cooper (1947–1950) : F. Cooper
- Percival Corbett (1922–1923) : P. T. Corbett
- Charles Corden (1900–1903) : C. F. Corden
- Taylor Cornall (2022–2023) : T. R. Cornall
- John Coventry (1919–1935) : J. B. Coventry
- Gilbert Cox (1935) : G. C. Cox
- Ben Cox (2009–2023) : O. B. Cox
- Leonard Crawley (1922–1923) : L. G. Crawley
- Bob Crisp (1938) : R. J. Crisp
- George Crowe (1906–1913) : G. L. Crowe
- John Cuffe (1903–1914) : J. A. Cuffe
- Henry Cullen (2022–2024) : H. J. Cullen (Note: Cullen played in four List A matches for the county in 2022. He was born at Redditch in 2003 and has played for Herefordshire.)
- Jim Cumbes (1972–1981) : J. Cumbes
- Miguel Cummins (2016) : M. L. Cummins
- Tim Curtis (1979–1997) : T. S. Curtis

== D ==
- Geoffrey Darks (1946–1950) : G. C. Darks
- Harry Darley (2024) : H. C. Darley
- Guy Davidge (1911) : G. M. C. Davidge
- Oliver Davidson (2022) : O. F. Davidson
- Steven Davies (2004–2009) : S. M. Davies
- Trefor Davies (1955–1961) : T. E. Davies
- John Davis (1922) : J. P. Davis
- Major Davis (1911) : M. Davis
- Ismail Dawood (1996–1997) : I. Dawood
- John Days (1899–1907) : J. E. Days
- Zander de Bruyn (2005) : Z. de Bruyn
- Jason de la Peña (1999) : J. M. de la Pêna
- Josh Dell (2018–2021) : J. J. Dell
- Louis Devereux (1950–1955) : L. N. Devereux
- Richard Devereux (1963) : R. J. Devereux
- George Dews (1946–1961) : G. Dews
- Graham Dilley (1987–1992) : G. R. Dilley
- Basil D'Oliveira (1964–1980) : B. L. D'Oliveira
- Brett D'Oliveira (2011–2025) : B. L. D'Oliveira
- Damian D'Oliveira (1982–1995) : D. B. D'Oliveira
- Allan Donald (2002) : A. A. Donald
- Philip Dorrell (1946) : P. G. Dorrell
- Ryan Driver (1998–2000) : R. C. Driver
- Alan Duff (1960–1961) : A. R. Duff
- Jacob Duffy (2025): J. A. Duffy
- Ben Dwarshuis (2021–2025) : B. J. Dwarshuis

== E ==
- Edwin Eden (1923) : E. Eden
- Rehaan Edavalath (2023–2024) : R. M. Edavalath (Note: Edavalath made his first-class debut for the county in June 2023. He was born at Wolverhampton in 2004 and educated at Newcastle-under-Lyme School and Malvern College.)
- Bert Edwards (1946) : H. C. Edwards
- Tim Edwards (1993–1994) : T. Edwards
- Ricardo Ellcock (1982–1988) : R. M. Ellcock
- John Elliott (1959–1965) : J. W. Elliott
- Scott Ellis (1996–1998) : S. W. K. Ellis
- Percy Evans (1928) : P. S. Evans
- William Evans (1901) : W. H. B. Evans
- Russell Everitt (1901) : R. S. Everitt
- Denis Evers (1936–1938) : R. D. M. Evers
- Reeve Evitts (2022) : R. L. Evitts (Note: Evitts, who was born in 2005 at Lichfield, played a single List A match for the county during the 2022 season.)

== F ==
- Percy Farnfield (1925) : P. H. Farnfield
- Leslie Fawcus (1925) : C. L. D. Fawcus
- Duncan Fearnley (1962–1968) : C. D. Fearnley
- Tom Fell (2013–2022) : T. C. Fell
- John Fereday (1894–1901) : J. B. Fereday
- Callum Ferguson (2018–2019) : C. J. Ferguson
- Dilhara Fernando (2008) : C. R. D. Fernando
- Charles Fiddian-Green (1931–1934) : C. A. F. Fiddian-Green
- Frank Field (1928–1931) : F. Field
- Adam Finch (2019–2025) : A. W. Finch
- Ian Fisher (2009) : I. D. Fisher
- Paul Fisher (1980–1981) : P. B. Fisher
- Jack Flavell (1949–1967) : J. A. Flavell
- Henry Foley (1925) : H. T. H. Foley
- Basil Foster (1902–1911) : B. S. Foster
- Christopher Foster (1927) : C. K. Foster
- Geoffrey Foster (1903–1914) : G. N. Foster
- Harry Foster (1890–1925) : H. K. Foster
- Maurice Foster (1908–1934) : M. K. Foster
- Neville Foster (1914–1923) : N. J. A. Foster
- R. E. Foster (1895–1912) : R. E. Foster
- Wilfrid Foster (1890–1911) : W. L. Foster
- Richard Fowler (1921) : R. H. Fowler
- John Fox (1929–1933) : J. Fox
- William Victor Fox (1923–1932) : W. V. Fox
- Percy Francis (1901–1902) : P. T. Francis
- Herbert Fulton (1914) : H. A. Fulton

== G ==
- Shannon Gabriel (2015) : S. T. Gabriel
- Leslie Gale (1923–1928) : L. E. Gale
- Humphry Garratt (1925–1928) : H. S. Garratt
- George Gaukrodger (1899–1910) : G. W. Gaukrodger
- Chris Gayle (2005) : C. H. Gayle
- Roy Genders (1947–1948) : W. R. Genders
- Stanley Gethin (1900–1901) : S. J. Gethin
- William Gethin (1921) : W. G. Gethin
- Ben Gibbon (2022–2025) : B. J. Gibbon
- Harold Gibbons (1927–1946) : H. H. I. H. Gibbons
- Alex Gidman (2015) : A. P. R. Gidman
- Norman Gifford (1960–1982) : N. Gifford
- Will Gifford (2006) : W. M. Gifford
- Humphrey Gilbert (1921–1930) : H. A. Gilbert
- Dennis Good (1946) : D. C. Good
- William Goodreds (1952) : W. A. Goodreds
- Herbert Gordon (1923–1924) : H. P. Gordon
- Tom Graveney (1961–1970) : T. W. Graveney
- John Greenstock (1924–1927) : J. W. Greenstock
- William Greenstock (1893–1919) : W. Greenstock
- Leonard Greenwood (1922–1926) : L. W. Greenwood
- Geoffrey Greig (1920–1925) : G. G. F. Greig
- Kevin Griffith (1967–1972) : K. Griffith
- Gordon Griffiths (1931–1935) : G. C. Griffiths
- Vernon Grimshaw (1936–1938) : V. Grimshaw
- Freddie Grisewood (1908) : F. H. Grisewood
- Charles Grove (1954–1955) : C. W. C. Grove
- Martin Guptill (2018–2019) : M. J. Guptill

== H ==
- Alex Hales (2014) : A. D. Hales
- Andrew Hall (2003–2004) : A. J. Hall
- Brian Hall (1956–1957) : B. C. Hall
- William Hampton (1925–1926) : W. M. Hampton
- John Harber (1914) : J. Harber
- Donald Harkness (1954) : D. P. Harkness
- Herbert Harper (1920) : H. Harper
- Andrew Harris (2008) : A. J. Harris
- George Harris (1925) : G. C. Harris
- Cyril Harrison (1934–1935) : C. S. Harrison
- Nick Harrison (2011–2013) : N. L. Harrison
- Mark Harrity (2003–2004) : M. A. Harrity
- Frank Harry (1919–1920) : F. Harry
- William Hartill (1935) : W. N. Hartill
- James Hartshorn (2024): J. W. Hartshorn
- Mohammad Hasnain (2022) : Mohammad Hasnain
- John Hastings (2017) : J. W. Hastings
- Gavin Haynes (1991–1999) : G. R. Haynes
- Jack Haynes (2018–2023) : J. A. Haynes
- Nantie Hayward (2003) : M. Hayward
- Travis Head (2018) : T. M. Head
- Ron Headley (1958–1974) : R. G. A. Headley
- Ted Hemsley (1963–1982) : E. J. O. Hemsley
- Steve Henderson (1977–1981) : S. P. Henderson
- Matt Henry (2016) : M. J. Henry
- Alex Hepburn (2015–2017) : A. Hepburn
- Steven Herzberg (1990) : S. Herzberg
- Graeme Hick (1984–2008) : G. A. Hick
- William Hickton (1909) : W. H. Hickton
- Harry Higgins (1920–1927) : H. L. Higgins
- John Higgins (1912–1931) : J. B. Higgins
- James Higginson (1912) : J. G. Higginson
- James Higgs-Walker (1913–1919) : J. A. Higgs-Walker
- Denys Hill (1927–1929) : D. V. Hill
- Walter Hill (1900) : W. H. Hill (Note: Hill, who was born in 1877, played two first-class matches for Worcestershire in 1900, scoring 46 runs. He died at Feock in Cornwall in 1955.)
- Tom Hinley (2024–2025): T. I. Hinley
- Kyle Hogg (2007) : K. W. Hogg
- Jason Holder (2024): J. O. Holder
- Vanburn Holder (1968–1980) : V. A. Holder
- Ronald Holyoake (1924) : R. H. Holyoake
- Jack Home (2024): J. E. Home
- Herbert Hopkins (1921–1931) : H. O. Hopkins
- Henry Horton (1946–1969) : H. Horton
- Joseph Horton (1934–1949) : J. Horton
- Martin Horton (1950–1966) : M. J. Horton
- Adam Hose (2023–2025) : A. J. Hose
- Joseph Howard (1894–1901) : J. Howard
- Dick Howorth (1933–1951) : R. Howorth
- Noel Hughes (1953–1954) : N. K. Hughes
- Phillip Hughes (2012) : P. J. Hughes
- Richard Hughes (1950–1951) : R. C. Hughes
- Roger Human (1934–1939) : R. H. C. Human
- Victor Humpherson (1921–1923) : V. W. Humpherson
- Cedric Humphries (1934–1935) : C. A. Humphries
- David Humphries (1977–1985) : D. J. Humphries
- Gerald Humphries (1932–1934) : G. H. Humphries
- Norman Humphries (1946) : N. H. Humphries
- Frederick Hunt (1895–1922) : F. Hunt
- Mel Hussain (1985) : M. Hussain
- William Hutchings (1905–1906) : W. E. C. Hutchings

== I ==
- Richard Illingworth (1982–2000) : R. K. Illingworth
- Imran Arif (2008–2010) : Imran Arif
- Imran Khan (1971–1976) : Imran Khan
- John Inchmore (1973–1986) : J. D. Inchmore
- Arthur Isaac (1893–1911) : A. W. Isaac
- Herbert Isaac (1919) : H. W. Isaac
- John Isaac (1902–1908) : J. E. V. Isaac
- Derek Isles (1967) : D. Isles

== J ==
- John Jackson (1907) : J. F. C. Jackson
- Peter Jackson (1929–1950) : P. F. Jackson
- Samuel Jagger (1922–1923) : S. T. Jagger
- Phil Jaques (2006–2010) : P. A. Jaques
- Enoch Jeavons (1924) : E. P. Jeavons
- Roly Jenkins (1938–1958) : R. O. Jenkins
- Arthur Jewell (1919–1920) : A. N. Jewell
- John Jewell (1939) : J. M. H. Jewell
- Maurice Jewell (1909–1933) : M. F. S. Jewell
- Edward Jobson (1879–1903) : E. P. Jobson
- Ivan Johnson (1972–1975) : I. N. Johnson
- Michael Johnson (2013) : M. A. Johnson
- Norman Jolly (1907) : N. W. Jolly
- Barry Jones (1976–1980) : B. J. R. Jones
- Cameron Jones (2023) : C. W. Jones (Note: Jones played a single List A match for the county in 2023. He was born at Wolverhampton in 2005.)
- Rob Jones (2023–2025) : R. P. Jones
- Ronald Jones (1955) : R. Jones
- Richard Jones (2006–2013) : R. A. Jones
- Simon Jones (2008) : S. P. Jones
- Alzarri Joseph (2021) : A. S. Joseph

== K ==
- Kabir Ali (1999–2009) : Kabir Ali
- Kadeer Ali (2000–2004) : Kadeer Ali
- Kapil Dev (1984–1985) : Kapil Dev
- Kashif Ali (2022–2025) : Kashif Ali
- John Keene (1902–1905) : J. W. Keene
- Justin Kemp (2003) : J. M. Kemp
- Don Kenyon (1942–1967) : D. Kenyon
- Alexei Kervezee (2008–2016) : A. N. Kervezee
- Hishaam Khan (2024) : H. M. Khan
- Simon Kimber (1985) : S. J. S. Kimber
- Roger Kimpton (1937–1949) : R. C. M. Kimpton
- Phil King (1935–1939) : B. P. King
- Collis King (1983–1985) : C. L. King
- John William King (1927–1928) : J. W. King
- Michael Klinger (2012) : M. Klinger
- Josh Knappett (2007–2009) : J. P. T. Knappett
- Tom Kohler-Cadmore (2014–2017) : T. Kohler-Cadmore
- Brian Krikken (1969) : B. E. Krikken

== L ==
- Stuart Lampitt (1985–2002) : S. R. Lampitt
- Robert Lanchbury (1973–1974) : R. J. Lanchbury
- Albert Lane (1914–1940) : A. F. Lane
- James Lang (1923–1924) : J. N. Lang
- Trevor Larkham (1949–1952) : W. T. Larkham
- Joe Leach (2010–2024) : J. Leach
- David Leatherdale (1988–2005) : D. A. Leatherdale
- Shane Lee (2002) : S. Lee
- Patrick Leeson (1936) : P. G. Leeson
- Antony Legard (1935) : A. R. Legard
- Jake Libby (2020–2025) : J. D. Libby
- Christopher Liptrot (1999–2003) : C. G. Liptrot
- Joseph Lister (1954–1970) : J. Lister
- Hartley Lobban (1952–1954) : H. W. Lobban
- Gordon Lord (1987–1991) : G. J. Lord
- William Lowe (1898–1911) : W. W. Lowe
- David Lucas (2012–2013) : D. S. Lucas
- Nathan Lyon (2017) : N. M. Lyon
- Charles Frederick Lyttelton (1906–1910) : C. F. Lyttelton
- Charles Lyttelton, 10th Viscount Cobham (1932–1948) : C. J. Lyttelton
- John Lyttelton, 9th Viscount Cobham (1924–1925) : J. C. Lyttelton

== M ==
- John MacLean (1922–1924) : J. F. MacLean
- Steve Magoffin (2008–2018) : S. J. Magoffin
- William Mann (1924) : W. H. Mann
- Jack Manuel (2009–2012) : J. K. Manuel
- Evelyn Martin (1898–1907) : E. G. Martin
- Sidney Martin (1931–1939) : S. H. Martin
- Matt Mason (2002–2011) : M. S. Mason
- Cecil Maxwell (1947–1951) : C. R. N. Maxwell
- Michael McEvoy (1983–1984) : M. S. A. McEvoy
- Steven McEwan (1985–1991) : S. M. McEwan
- Glenn McGrath (2000) : G. D. McGrath
- Mitchell McClenaghan (2014) : M. J. McClenaghan
- Mehraj Ahmed (2007–2009) : Mehraj Ahmed (Note: Mehraj was born in January 1989 at Birmingham and played club cricket in the city. A right-handed batsman and a right-arm medium-fast bowler he played for the county Second XI from 2006 before making his List A debut in May 2008, and his first-class debut against Loughborough UCCE in the same week. He played one more first-class match the following season. In total he took three wickets for the county in senior cricket.)
- George Mills (1953) : G. T. Mills
- Alex Milton (2018–2019) : A. G. Milton
- Maneer Mirza (1997) : M. M. Mirza
- Parvaz Mirza (1994–1995) : P. Mirza
- Daryl Mitchell (2004–2021) : D. K. H. Mitchell
- Kenneth Mitchell (1944–1946) : K. J. Mitchell
- Moeen Ali (2007–2022) : Moeen Ali
- Tom Moody (1990–1999) : T. M. Moody
- Stephen Moore (2003–2009) : S. C. Moore
- Peter Moores (1983–1984) : P. Moores
- Charles Morris (2013–2023) : C. A. J. Morris
- Percy Morris (1914) : P. J. Morris (Note: Morris was born in 1890 at Kington in Herefordshire and educated at Hereford Cathedral School before working as a bank clerk, later becoming a bank manager. He played a single first-class match for the county, scoring 74 runs, with a highest score of 71, against Leicestershire in 1914. He died at Cheltenham in Gloucestershire in 1965.)
- Raymond Morris (1958) : R. Morris
- Harry Mortimer (1904) : H. Mortimer
- Reginald Moss (1925) : R. H. Moss
- Harry Moule (1952) : H. G. Moule
- Reginald Munn (1896–1900) : R. G. Munn
- Colin Munro (2014–2022) : C. Munro
- Peter Murray-Willis (1935–1936) : P. E. Murray-Willis

== N ==
- Nadeem Malik (2004–2007) : Nadeem Malik
- James Naden (1922) : J. R. Naden
- Phil Neale (1975–1992) : P. A. Neale
- Dewald Nel (2007) : J. D. Nel
- Arnold Nesbitt (1914) : A. S. Nesbitt
- Edward Nesfield (1919–1920) : E. R. Nesfield
- Bernard Nevile (1913) : B. P. Nevile
- Phil Newport (1982–1999) : P. J. Newport
- Maurice Nichol (1928–1934) : M. Nichol
- Henry Nicholls (2025): H. M. Nicholls
- John Nichols (1902–1904) : J. E. Nichols
- Ashley Noffke (2009) : A. A. Noffke
- Ernest Norton (1922–1923) : E. W. Norton

== O ==
- Leonard Oakley (1935–1948) : L. Oakley
- Richard Oliver (2014–2015) : R. K. Oliver
- Alan Ormrod (1962–1983) : J. A. Ormrod
- Steve O'Shaughnessy (1988–1989) : S. J. O'Shaughnessy
- Laddie Outschoorn (1946–1959) : L. F. Outschoorn

== P ==
- Cecil Palmer (1904) : C. H. Palmer
- Charles Palmer (1938–1949) : C. H. Palmer
- Matthew Pardoe (2010–2014) : M. G. Pardoe
- John Parker (1971–1975) : J. M. Parker
- Wayne Parnell (2018–2019) : W. D. Parnell
- Michael Passey (1953) : M. F. W. Passey
- Iftikhar Ali Khan Pataudi (1932–1938) : Nawab of Pataudi
- Dipak Patel (1976–1986) : D. N. Patel
- Harshad Patel (1985) : H. V. Patel
- Guy Pawson (1908) : A. G. Pawson
- Derek Pearson (1954–1961) : D. B. Pearson
- Frederick Pearson (1900–1926) : F. A. Pearson
- Dillon Pennington (2018–2023) : D. Y. Pennington
- Reg Perks (1930–1955) : R. T. D. Perks
- Ernest Perry (1933–1946) : E. H. Perry
- Harry Perry (1927–1928) : H. Perry
- Stephen Perryman (1982–1983) : S. P. Perryman
- Stephen Peters (2002–2005) : S. D. Peters
- Peter Phelps (1931–1932) : P. H. Phelps
- Neil Pinner (2011–2013) : N. D. Pinner
- James Pipe (1998–2005) : D. J. Pipe
- Paul Pollard (1999–2001) : P. R. Pollard
- Ed Pollock (2022–2025) : E. J. Pollock
- Cecil Ponsonby (1911–1928) : C. B. Ponsonby
- Stanley Porthouse (1934–1935) : S. C. Porthouse
- Albert Powell (1921) : A. J. Powell
- Horatio Powys-Keck (1898–1907) : H. J. Powys-Keck
- David Pratt (1958–1960) : D. Pratt
- Ben Preece (1996) : B. E. A. Preece
- Charles Preece (1920–1929) : C. R. Preece
- John Price (1927–1929) : J. Price
- Ray Price (2004–2007) : R. W. Price
- William Price (1923) : W. H. Price
- Walter Price (1904) : W. L. Price
- Paul Pridgeon (1972–1989) : A. P. Pridgeon
- Cecil Pullan (1935–1938) : C. D. A. Pullan

== Q ==
- Bernard Quaife (1928–1937) : B. W. Quaife

== R ==
- Neal Radford (1985–1995) : N. V. Radford
- James Ralph (1996) : J. T. Ralph
- Matthew Rawnsley (1996–2002) : M. J. Rawnsley
- George Rhodes (2016–2019) : G. H. Rhodes
- Steve Rhodes (1985–2004) : S. J. Rhodes
- Alan Richardson (2010–2013) : A. Richardson
- Dick Richardson (1952–1967) : D. W. Richardson
- Peter Richardson (1949–1958) : P. E. Richardson
- William Richardson (1920–1928) : W. E. Richardson
- Edward Righton junior (1934–1936) : E. G. Righton junior
- Edward Righton senior (1911–1913) : E. G. Righton senior
- Jack Riley (1953) : J. Riley
- Kemar Roach (2011) : K. A. J. Roach
- Paul Roberts (1972–1975) : C. P. Roberts
- Edward Stanley Roberts (1925) : E. S. Roberts
- Arthur W. Robinson (1920–1926) : A. W. Robinson
- Peter Robinson (1963–1964) : P. J. Robinson
- Clayton Robson (1921) : C. G. W. Robson
- Gareth Roderick (2021–2025) : G. H. Roderick
- Harry Rogers (1923–1928) : H. O. Rogers
- Rupert Rogers (1919) : R. A. C. Rogers
- Francis Romney (1893–1900) : F. W. Romney
- Fred Root (1921–1932) : C. F. Root
- Thomas G. Rose (1922) : T. G. Rose
- Lloyd Rudge (1952) : L. M. Rudge
- Fred Rumsey (1960–1962) : F. E. Rumsey
- Chris Russell (2010–2014) : C. J. Russell
- Hamish Rutherford (2019–2020) : H. D. Rutherford
- Ian Rutherford (1976) : I. A. Rutherford

== S ==
- Saeed Ajmal (2011–2015) : Saeed Ajmal
- Navdeep Saini (2023) : N. Saini
- Henry Sale (1921–1925) : H. G. Sale
- Thilan Samaraweera (2013) : T. T. Samaraweera
- Gerald Sanderson (1923) : G. B. Sanderson
- John Santall (1930) : J. F. E. Santall
- Mitchell Santner (2016–2023) : M. J. Santner
- Martyn Saunders (1980) : M. Saunders
- John Scholey (1952–1954) : J. C. Scholey
- Michael Scothern (1985) : M. G. Scothern
- Ben Scott (2010–2012) : B. J. M. Scott
- Mark Scott (1981–1983) : M. S. Scott
- John Sedgley (1959–1961) : J. B. Sedgley
- Gerald Seeley (1921) : G. H. Seeley
- Sachithra Senanayake (2015) : S. M. S. M. Senanayake
- Ravinder Senghera (1974–1976) : R. Senghera
- Louis Serrurier (1927) : L. R. Serrurier
- Adam Seymour (1992–1994) : A. C. H. Seymour
- Shaaiq Choudhry (2010–2014) : Shaaiq Choudhry
- Shaftab Khalid (2003–2006) : Shaftab Khalid
- William Shakespeare (1919–1931) : W. H. N. Shakespeare
- Shakib Al Hasan (2010–2011) : Shakib Al Hasan
- Adrian Shankar (2011) : A. Shankar
- Jack Shantry (2009–2017) : J. D. Shantry
- Sydney Shepherd (1936) : S. G. Shepherd
- Geoffrey Sheppard (1919) : G. A. Sheppard
- Thomas Sheppard (1909) : T. W. Sheppard
- Alamgir Sheriyar (1996–2005) : A. Sheriyar
- Shoaib Akhtar (2005) : Shoaib Akhtar
- Shoaib Bashir (2024) : Shoaib Bashir
- Wilfred Shorting (1922–1926) : W. L. Shorting
- Albert Shutt (1972–1973) : A. Shutt
- Roger Sillence (2006–2007) : R. J. Sillence
- George Simpson-Hayward (1894–1914) : G. H. T. Simpson-Hayward
- Anurag Singh (2001–2003) : A. Singh
- Fateh Singh (2024–2025) : F. Singh
- Yadvinder Singh (2024–2025) : Y. Singh
- Sandy Singleton (1934–1946) : A. P. Singleton
- Michael Singleton (1946) : G. M. Singleton
- Doug Slade (1958–1971) : D. N. F. Slade
- Ben Smith (2002–2010) : B. F. Smith
- Douglas James Smith (1889–1904) : D. J. Smith
- David Smith (1984–1986) : D. M. Smith
- James Crosbie Smith (1923–1925) : J. C. Smith
- Lawrence Smith (1985–1987) : L. K. Smith
- Nathan Smith (2024) : N. G. Smith
- Steve Smith (2010) : S. P. D. Smith
- Ish Sodhi (2021) : I. S. Sodhi
- Vikram Solanki (1993–2012) : V. S. Solanki
- Edward Walter Solly (1903–1907) : E. W. Solly
- Arthur Somers-Cocks, 6th Baron Somers (1923–1925) : Lord Somers
- Ernest Somers-Smith (1921) : E. Somers-Smith
- Harry Southall (1907) : H. Southall
- Alan Spencer (1957–1961) : A. H. Spencer
- Harry Spencer (1927) : H. N. E. Spencer
- John Spilsbury (1952) : J. W. E. Spilsbury
- Reuben Spiring (1993–2000) : K. R. Spiring
- Jim Standen (1958–1970) : J. A. Standen
- Mitchell Stanley (2022–2023) : M. T. Stanley
- John Stanning (1939–1946) : J. Stanning junior
- Richard Stemp (1990–1992) : R. D. Stemp
- John Stephenson (1947) : J. W. A. Stephenson
- Bertie Stevens (1905–1914) : B. G. Stevens
- David Stewart (1970–1973) : D. E. R. Stewart
- Peter Stimpson (1970–1972) : P. J. Stimpson
- Thomas Straw (1894–1907) : T. Straw
- Thomas Stringer (1909) : T. Stringer
- Tommy Sturgess (2024) : T. G. Sturgess
- Sidney Styler (1929–1931) : S. W. Styler
- Ernest Suckling (1923–1924) : E. Suckling
- Douglas Summers (1930) : D. W. L. Summers
- Francis Summers (1921–1928) : F. T. Summers
- John Sutor (1928) : J. A. Sutor
- Reginald Swalwell (1907–1920) : R. S. Swalwell

== T ==
- Charles Tarbox (1921–1929) : C. V. Tarbox
- Alfred Tasker (1956) : A. G. E. Tasker
- David Taylor (2003) : D. K. Taylor
- Robert Taylor (1900) : R. J. Taylor
- Tom Taylor (2024–2025) : T. A. I. Taylor
- William Taylor (1909–1925) : W. H. Taylor
- Paul Thomas (1995–1997) : P. A. Thomas
- William Thomas (1981) : W. R. K. Thomas
- Guy Thornycroft (1947) : G. M. Thornycroft
- Philip Thorp (1935) : P. Thorp
- John Thursfield (1922–1925) : J. H. Thursfield
- Ted Tinkler (1940–1956) : E. Tinkler
- Benjamin Tipper (1919) : B. C. C. Tipper
- Chris Tolley (1989–1995) : C. M. Tolley
- Francis Tomkinson (1902) : F. M. Tomkinson
- Geoffrey Tomkinson (1903–1926) : G. S. Tomkinson
- Josh Tongue (2016–2023) : J. C. Tongue
- Charles Toppin (1927–1928) : C. G. Toppin
- John Toppin (1920) : J. F. T. Toppin
- Glenn Turner (1967–1982) : G. M. Turner
- J. W. Cecil Turner (1911–1921) : J. W. C. Turner
- Richard Turner (1909–1922) : R. E. Turner
- Ben Twohig (2018) : B. J. Twohig

== U ==
- Usama Mir (2023) : Usama Mir

== V ==
- Chaminda Vaas (2005) : W. P. U. J. C. Vaas
- Logan van Beek (2023–2024) : L. V. van Beek
- Lou Vincent (2006) : L. Vincent
- Amar Virdi (2024) : A. Virdi
- Louis Vorster (1988) : L. P. Vorster

== W ==
- Matthew Waite (2022–2025) : M. J. Waite
- Percy Wakefield (1922) : P. H. Wakefield
- Edwin Wakelin (1910) : E. Wakelin
- John Walford (1923–1930) : J. E. S. Walford
- Charles Wallace (1921–1922) : C. W. Wallace
- Hayden Walsh Jr. (2024) : H. R. Walsh
- Cyril Walters (1928–1940) : C. F. Walters
- Frank Warne (1934–1938) : F. B. Warne
- Alan Warner (1982–1984) : A. E. Warner
- Stephen Watkins (1983) : S. G. Watkins
- Greg Watson (1978–1979) : G. G. Watson
- Andrew Webster (1981–1982) : A. J. Webster
- Stuart Wedge (2005–2007) : S. A. Wedge
- Thomas Wells (1950) : T. U. Wells
- Riki Wessels (2019–2021) : M. H. Wessels
- Olly Westbury (2018–2019) : O. E. Westbury
- Martin Weston (1979–1993) : M. J. Weston
- Phil Weston (1991–2002) : W. P. C. Weston
- David Wheeldon (2009–2010) : D. A. Wheeldon
- Chris Whelan (2008–2011) : C. D. Whelan
- Fred Wheldon (1893–1906) : G. F. Wheldon
- Philip John Whitcombe (1949–1952) : P. J. Whitcombe
- Allan White (1939–1950) : A. F. T. White
- Montague White (1931–1934) : M. E. White
- John Whitehead (1953–1955) : J. P. Whitehead
- Ross Whiteley (2013–2021) : R. A. Whiteley
- Norman Whiting (1947–1952) : N. H. Whiting
- David Wigley (2003–2005) : D. H. Wigley
- Gordon Wilcock (1970–1978) : H. G. Wilcock
- Alexander Wilkes (1925–1931) : A. J. Wilkes
- William Wilkes (1892–1902) : W. H. W. Wilkes
- John Wilkinson (1927) : J. W. Wilkinson
- Keith Wilkinson (1969–1975) : K. W. Wilkinson
- H. Williams (1927) : H. Williams (Note: Williams played four matches for the team in 1927. Other than a surname and initial no biographical details are known.)
- Richard Williams (1923–1932) : R. H. Williams
- Elliott Wilson (1998–2000) : E. J. Wilson
- George Alfred Wilson (1897–1906) : G. A. Wilson
- George Clifford Wilson (1924–1926) : G. C. Wilson
- Grenville Wilson (1951–1954) : G. T. O. Wilson
- Harry Wilson (1901–1906) : H. Wilson
- John Winnington (1908) : J. F. S. Winnington
- Thomas Winwood (1930–1934) : T. L. Winwood
- Luke Wood (2018) : L. Wood
- Damien Wright (2011) : D. G. Wright
- Leslie Wright (1925–1933) : L. Wright
- Bob Wyatt (1946–1951) : R. E. S. Wyatt
- Alick Wyers (1927) : A. Wyers
- Alex Wylie (1993–1995) : A. Wylie

== Y ==
- Jim Yardley (1967–1975) : T. J. Yardley
- Hugo Yarnold (1938–1955) : H. Yarnold
- Martin Young (1946–1948) : D. M. Young
- Younis Ahmed (1979–1983) : Younis Ahmed

== Z ==
- Zaheer Khan (2006) : Zaheer Khan

== See also ==
- List of Worcestershire cricket captains
