= Edward Righton =

Edward Righton may refer to:

- Edward Righton Sr (1884–1964), English cricketer
- Edward Righton Jr (1912–1986), English cricketer, son of the above
- Edward Righton (actor) (1838–1899), English actor
