= Frank Summers =

Frank Summers may refer to:

- Francis Summers (1887–1967), English first-class cricketer
- Frank Summers (coach) (1899–1974), American football, basketball, and baseball coach
- Frank Summers (judge) (1914–1993), Chief Justice of the Louisiana Supreme Court
- Frank Summers (Australian footballer) (born 1930), former Australian rules footballer
- Frank Summers (American football) (born 1985), American football fullback and special teamer
