= Adshead =

Adshead is an English-language toponymic surname originating from a location near Prestbury, Cheshire, England. Notable people with the surname include:

- Daniel Adshead (born 2001), English footballer
- Frank Adshead (1894–1977), English cricketer
- Gladys Lucy Adshead (1896–1985), writer of children's books
- Gwen Adshead (born 1960), English forensic psychotherapist
- Herbert Bealey Adshead (1862–1932), Canadian writer and politician
- John Adshead (born 1942), English football manager
- Joseph Adshead (1800–1861), British merchant and political campaigner from Manchester.
- Kay Adshead (born 1954), British actress, poet, and playwright
- Mary Adshead (1904–1995), English painter
- Mercia MacDermott (née Adshead) (1927–2023), English writer and historian
- Stanley Adshead (1868–1946), English architect
- Stephen Adshead (born 1980), English cricketer
- William Adshead (1901–1951), English cricketer
