= Liptrot =

Liptrot is a surname. Notable people with the surname include:

- Amy Liptrot (born 1981 or 1982), Scottish journalist and author
- Christopher Liptrot (born 1980), English cricketer
- Graham Liptrot (born 1955), English rugby league footballer
