= Naden =

Naden may refer to:

== People ==
- Brent Naden (b. 1995), Australian rugby player
- Constance Naden (1858–1889), English writer
- George Ratcliffe Naden (1865–1953), English political figure
- James Naden (1889–1963), English cricketer
- Malcolm Naden (b. 1973), Australian murder suspect
- Tony Naden, British lexicographer

== Places ==
- Naden Harbour, Canada
- Naden Brook, England
- Naden, Iran (disambiguation), places in Iran

== Other uses ==
- Naden Band of Maritime Forces Pacific, part of the Royal Canadian Navy
- Naden Boats, Canadian fishing boat line
- Naden gecko, species of gecko native to Laos
