= Romney (surname) =

Romney is an English surname. Notable people with the surname include:

== Academics ==
- George S. Romney (1874–1935), American university president
- A. Kimball Romney (1925–2023), American academic and anthropologist

== Artists ==
- George Romney (painter) (1734–1802), English portrait painter
- John Romney (1785–1863), English engraver

== Athletes ==
- Baylor Romney, American football player
- David Romney (born 1993), American soccer player
- Elwood Romney (1911–1970), American basketball player and coach
- Francis Romney (1873–1963), English cricketer
- Dick Romney (1895–1969), American football coach
- Milton Romney (1899–1975), American football player
- G. Ott Romney (1892–1973), American football player and coach
- Val Romney (1718–1773), English cricketer

== Politicians ==
- Cyril Romney (1931–2007), Chief Minister of the British Virgin Islands from 1983 to 1986
- Romney family, a family prominent in U.S. politics
  - G. Scott Romney (born 1941), Michigan Republican politician and lawyer
  - Ann Romney (born 1949), former First Lady of Massachusetts
  - George W. Romney (1907–1995), former CEO of American Motors, Governor of Michigan, and U.S. Secretary of Housing and Urban Development
  - Lenore Romney (1908–1998), Michigan politician, former First Lady of Michigan
  - Mitt Romney (born 1947), Republican politician, U.S. Senator for Utah, and former Governor of Massachusetts, and businessman
  - Ronna Romney (born 1943), Michigan Republican politician and radio talk show host

== Other people ==
- Wavy Gravy or Hugh Romney (born 1936), American entertainer and peace activist
- Marion G. Romney (1897–1988), American leader in the Church of Jesus Christ of Latter-day Saints
- William Romney (died 1611), English merchant, governor of the East India Company
