= Allchurch =

Allchurch is a surname. Notable people with the surname include:

- Denis Allchurch (born 1953), Canadian politician in Saskatchewan
- Emily Allchurch (born 1974), British artist
- Ivor Allchurch (1929–1997), Welsh international footballer, brother of Len
- Len Allchurch (1933–2016), Welsh international footballer, brother of Ivor
- Thomas Allchurch (1883–1934), English-born cricketer who played for Worcestershire
