= Humpherson =

Humpherson is a surname. Notable people with the surname include:

- Andrew Humpherson (born 1960), Australian politician
- Victor Humpherson (1896–1978), English cricketer
