= Dorrell =

Dorrell is a surname. Notable people with the surname include:

- Arthur Dorrell (1896–1942), English international footballer
- George Thomas Dorrell VC, MBE (1880–1971), English recipient of the Victoria Cross
- Karl Dorrell (born 1963), American football coach and former player
- Philip Dorrell (1914–1994), English cricketer
- Scholanda Dorrell (born 1983), American professional women's basketball player
- Stephen Dorrell (born 1952), British politician
