= Cordin =

Cordin is a surname. Notable people with the surname include:

- Gervais Cordin (born 1998), French rugby union player
- Karl Cordin (born 1948), Austrian alpine skier

== See also ==
- Corbin (surname)
- Corden
