= Shutt =

Shutt may refer to:

- Albert Shutt (born 1952), an English cricketer
- Carl Shutt (born 1961), an English football player
- David Shutt, Baron Shutt of Greetland, British politician
- Elsie Shutt (born 1928), an American computer programmer and entrepreneur
- Isaac Thomas Shutt (1818–1879) British architect and hotel owner
- Ken Shutt (1928-2010), an American painter and sculptor
- Steve Shutt (born 1952), a Canadian ice hockey player
- Topper Shutt, a television meteorologist
