= Passey =

Passey is a surname. Notable people with the surname include:

- Anna Passey (born 1984), English actress
- Michael Passey (born 1937), English cricketer
- M. N. Passey (1934–2002), Indian physician and rheumatologist
- Peter Passey (born 1952), English footballer
