= Hartill =

Hartill is a surname. Notable people with the surname include:

- Billy Hartill (1905–1980), British footballer
- Mark Hartill (born 1964), Australian rugby union player
- Percy Hartill (1892–1964), British Anglican priest and author
- Rob Hartill (born 1969), British computer programmer and web designer
- William Hartill (1911–1971), British cricketer
