= Sutor (surname) =

Sutor is an occupational surname from the Latin word sutor, meaning "shoemaker".

English and Scottish iterations of the name may have formed as variations of Suter or Souter, often with the same Latin origins, coming from the Middle English (Note: Charnock (1868) used O.Eng. (Old English) to refer to a stage of the English language now known as Middle English.) word souter, from the earlier Anglo-Saxon word sutere, from sutor in Latin. While the Sutor surname in its pure Latin form is relatively uncommon in present-day England, it is noted to have been very common in the 12th century; however, early records of Old English and French occupational surnames in England were often recorded in Latin, and Sutor was often a translation of the Old English sūtere. Nevertheless, the Sutor surname continues to survive in England, well after the end of this practice. During the Renaissance, the latinization of names became a common practice. In English, Sutor came from names meaning shoemaker, and in Germany, where this practice of latinization became especially popular, German surnames meaning shoemaker also became Sutor, such as Schumacher, which had itself originated from the Latin word. German and Polish instances of the surname have also formed as occupational surnames for tailors, in addition to shoemakers, still from the same Latin word sutor.

Notable people with the surname include:

- Albrecht Sutor (1691–1758), Livonian pastor
- August Sutor (1812–1884), German lawyer and politician
- Edward Sutor (1917–1984), Polish sculptor
- Emil Sutor (1888–1974), German sculptor
- George Sutor (1943–2011), American basketball player
- Hans Sutor (1895–1976), German footballer
- Jacob Sutor (17th century), German fencing master
- John Sutor (1909–1966), English cricketer
- Joshua Sutor (born 1999), German curler
- Julian Sutor (1931–2020), Polish diplomat
- June Sutor (1929–1990), New Zealand-born crystallographer
- Kim Sutor (born 2003), German curler
- Magnus Sutor (born 2001), German curler
- Petrus Sutor (c. 1480–1537), French theologian
- Russell Sutor (1951–1995), Canadian businessman and politician
- Uli Sutor (born 1960), German curler and coach
- Wilhelm Sutor (1774–1828), German composer
