= Leeson =

Leeson is a surname. Notable people with the surname include:

- Bill Leeson (born 1943), British filmmaker
- Cecil Leeson (1902–1989), American musician
- David Leeson (1957–2022), American photojournalist
- Edward Leeson, British musician
- George Mansfield Leeson, Canadian politician
- John Leeson (1943–2026), British actor
- Joseph Leeson, 1st Earl of Milltown (1701–1783), Irish brewer
- Lynn Hershman Leeson (born 1941), American filmmaker
- Michael J. Leeson (died 2016), American screenwriter
- Nick Leeson (born 1967), derivatives trader for Barings Bank
- Patrick Leeson (1915–1997), English cricketer
- Peter Leeson (born 1979), American economist

== Other uses ==
Leeson is an electric motor brand name under the Regal Rexnord Corporation.

== See also ==
- Zita Leeson Weinshienk (1933–2022), American judge
- Leeson Street, a thoroughfare in south Dublin, Ireland
- Leason, a surname and given name
