= Arnold Nesbitt =

Arnold Nesbitt may refer to:

- Arnold Nesbitt (cricketer)
- Arnold Nesbitt (MP)
