= Alan Spencer =

Alan Spencer may refer to:

- Alan Spencer (writer), American director and writer
- Alan Spencer (cricketer), English cricketer

== See also ==
- Lord Alan Spencer-Churchill, British aristocrat and officer in the British Army
