= Frederick Burr (disambiguation) =

Frederick Burr (1887–1915) was an English cricketer.

Frederick Burr may also refer to:

- Fred Burr (1911–2006), Canadian politician

== See also ==
- Frederick Burr Opper (1857–1937), American newspaper comic strip cartoonist
