= Larkham =

Larkham is a surname, which may refer to:

- Brent Larkham, Australian tennis player
- Brent Larkham, Australian musician
- David Larkham, art director and designer
- Mark Larkham, Australian racing driver
- Peter Larkham, British professor of planning
- Stephen Larkham, Australian rugby union player
- Tavis Larkham, American visual effects specialist/actor
- Thomas Larkham, English Puritan clergyman
- Todd Larkham, Australian tennis player
- Trevor Larkham, English cricketer
