= Roy Barker =

Roy Barker may refer to:

- Roy Barker (American football) (born 1969), American football player
- Roy Barker (priest) (1933–2011), dean of Grahamstown
- Roy Barker (cricketer) (1947–2020), English cricketer
