= Percy Evans =

Percy Evans may refer to:

- Percy Evans (cricketer), British cricketer
- Percy Evans (footballer), Australian rules footballer
- Percy Evans (geologist), British geologist
