= Corden =

Corden is a surname. Notable people with the surname include:

- Charles Corden (1874–1924), English cricketer, who played 17 times for Worcestershire between 1900 and 1903
- Henry Corden (1920–2005), Canadian-born American actor and voice artist who took over the role of Fred Flintstone after Alan Reed died in 1977
- James Corden (born 1978), English actor, television writer, producer and presenter
- W. Max Corden (1927–2023), Australian economist
- Wayne Corden (born 1975), professional footballer currently playing for Non League side Leek Town
- William Corden the Elder (1795–1867), English portrait painter and miniaturist known for his commissions from the Royal Family in the 19th century

== See also ==
- Horne & Corden, British sketch show
- James Corden's World Cup Live, comedy chat show hosted by comedian James Corden during the 2010 FIFA World Cup
- List of Horne & Corden episodes
