= Robert Berkeley (cricketer) =

Personal information
- Full name: Robert George Wilmot Berkeley
- Born: 23 April 1898; Warley Place, Essex, England
- Died: 28 August 1969 (aged 71); Bristol, Gloucestershire, England
- Batting: Right-handed

Career statistics
Competition	FC
Matches	4
Runs scored	37
Batting average	5.28
100s/50s	0/0
Top score	16
Balls bowled	0
Wickets	0
Bowling average	-
5 wickets in innings	0
10 wickets in match	0
Best bowling	-
Catches/stumpings	0/0
- Source: CricketArchive, 2 May 2009

Captain Robert George Wilmot Berkeley, DL (23 April 1898 – 28 August 1969), served as High Sheriff of Worcestershire (1933/34), and from 1952 as a Deputy Lieutenant for the county. He also played first-class cricket for Worcestershire County Cricket Club.

Captain Berkeley lived at Spetchley Park in Worcestershire before inheriting Berkeley Castle in Gloucestershire from his 13th cousin, the 8th and last Earl of Berkeley, in 1942.

== Life ==
Educated at Downside and the Oratory School, Berkeley served with the Westminster Dragoons in Palestine and on the Western Front during the First World War; he also served in the Second World War, being promoted Captain while serving with the Royal Artillery. Appointed Deputy Master of the Berkeley Hunt in 1923, he served as its Joint Master from 1928 until his death.

== Cricket ==
Berkeley played four first-class matches for Worcestershire soon after the First World War, his last, against Northamptonshire in 1922, being in the County Championship.

A member of MCC, Berkeley also scored 138 in a minor game for Gentlemen of Worcestershire against Gentlemen of Suffolk in 1933.

== Family ==
The only son of Major Robert Berkeley (1853–1940), of Spetchley Park, descended from Sir Rowland Berkeley, he was in remainder to the Berkeley barony.

In 1927 he married the Hon. Myrtle Dormer (1907–1982), second daughter of the Charles, 14th Baron Dormer, CBE. Captain and the Hon. Mrs Berkeley had two daughters (including Rosalind, a nun) and one son:

- Major John Berkeley (1931–2017), High Sheriff of Worcestershire for 1967/68, married 1967 Georgina Stirling-Home-Drummond-Moray (born 1939), having two sons:
  - Richard Berkeley (born 1968)
  - Henry Berkeley (born 1969).

Captain Berkeley died in 1969 at a Bristol nursing home.

== See also ==
- Berkeley Castle
- Spetchley Park
- List of Worcestershire County Cricket Club players
