= Percival Brinton =

English cricketer

Career statistics
Competition	First-class
Matches	1
Runs scored	1
Batting average	1.00
100s/50s	0/0
Top score	1
Catches/stumpings	0/–
- Source: Cricinfo, 6 December 2022

Percival Robert Brinton (5 February 1873 – 14 May 1958) was an English cricketer, who played one first-class match, for Worcestershire against Oxford University in 1904. He scored only one run in his only innings before being dismissed by Adolph von Ernsthausen.

Brinton was born at Moor Hall, Lower Mitton, Worcestershire, the son of John Brinton Chairman of Brintons carpet manufacturers and MP for Kidderminster. Percival's brother Reginald, also chairman of Brintons, served as Mayor of Kidderminster, and made 13 appearances for Worcestershire.

Brinton died in Oxford at the age of 85.
