= Reginald Brinton =

English cricketer and industrialist (1870 - 1942)

Cricket information
- Batting: Right-handed
- Bowling: Right-arm fast-medium

Career statistics
Competition	First-class
Matches	13
Runs scored	332
Batting average	19.52
100s/50s	0/2
Top score	72*
Balls bowled	12
Wickets	0
Bowling average	–
5 wickets in innings	–
10 wickets in match	–
Best bowling	–
Catches/stumpings	3/–
- Source: Cricinfo, 13 April 2023

Reginald Seymour Brinton (15 December 1870 – 23 February 1942) was an English industrialist and cricketer, who played 13 first-class matches for Worcestershire in the early twentieth century.

Born at Moor Hall in Lower Mitton, Kidderminster, Worcestershire, Brinton was a member of the Kidderminster carpet-making family. In 1914, he became Chairman of Brintons on the death of his father John Brinton, who had run the firm since 1857. He retained this position until his death in 1942. Also in 1914, Reginald Brinton was made Mayor of Kidderminster.

Brinton was educated at Winchester and New College, Oxford, although he did not reach the first eleven for cricket at either establishment. He made his first-class debut against Yorkshire in the 1903 County Championship, scoring 66 not out in the second innings and helping Worcestershire avoid defeat. He played two other games that season, against Cambridge University and Somerset, but made little impression.

In July 1904 against Oxford University, Brinton made his highest first-class innings, scoring an unbeaten 72 in an imposing Worcestershire first innings of 490; nevertheless, Oxford won the game. This was, however, his last contribution of any real note: in the 18 remaining innings of his first-class career, Brinton never made more than 30, and after 1906 he played only one more match, against Middlesex in June 1909.

He died in Kidderminster, Worcestershire, at the age of 72.

Reginald's brother Percival made a single appearance for Worcestershire in 1904.
