= Leason =

Leason is both a surname and a given name. Notable people with the name include:

- Brett Leason (born 1999), Canadian ice hockey player
- Jeff R. Leason, American game designer
- Nick Leason (born 1968), British racing driver
- Percy Leason (1889–1959), Australian cartoonist
- Leason Adams (1887–1969), American geophysicist

== See also ==
- Leeson, a surname
