= Harry Mortimer (cricketer) =

English cricketer

Career statistics
Competition	First-class
Matches	1
Runs scored	11
Batting average	5.50
100s/50s	0/0
Top score	7
Catches/stumpings	0/0
- Source: Cricinfo, 7 November 2022

Harry Mortimer (23 November 1872 – 18 July 1953) was an English first-class cricketer, who played only one first-class match, which was for Worcestershire against Kent in August 1904. Batting at ten, he scored 4 and 7, and made no dismissals behind the stumps.

Mortimer was born at Sculcoates, Hull, and died in King's Norton, Birmingham at the age of 80.
