= Harry Southall =

English cricketer

Cricket information
- Batting: Right-handed

Career statistics
Competition	First-class
Matches	1
Runs scored	11
Batting average	11.00
100s/50s	0/0
Top score	11
Catches/stumpings	0/0
- Source: CricInfo, 7 November 2022

Harry Southall (24 January 1885 – 22 January 1952) was an English first-class cricketer who played a single first-class match for Worcestershire against Lancashire in 1907 aged 23. He scored 11 in his only innings before being dismissed by Lawrence Cook.

Southall was born in Kingswinford; he died in Pensnett, Staffordshire, aged 66.
