= William Caldwell (cricketer) =

English cricketer

Cricket information
- Batting: Right-handed

Career statistics
Competition	First-class
Matches	20
Runs scored	673
Batting average	21.03
100s/50s	2/1
Top score	133
Balls bowled	66
Wickets	2
Bowling average	20.00
5 wickets in innings	0
10 wickets in match	0
Best bowling	2/23
Catches/stumpings	6/–
- Source: Cricinfo, 15 April 2023

William Somerville Caldwell (26 February 1878 – 14 January 1964) was an English cricketer, who played 20 first-class games for Worcestershire in the early twentieth century. After the end of his first-class career, he also played for Cheshire in the Minor Counties Championship.

He made his debut in July 1901 in a drawn match against Kent at Worcester, but was bowled for nought in his only innings. He did little better against Sussex at the same venue at the start of August, making only 0 and 5, and did not play again until 1903. That year proved to be much his best, as he hit 403 runs at 26.86 in 16 innings including his only two centuries, both made at Worcester: 133 against Sussex at Worcester and 101 against Leicestershire.

In 1904 Caldwell's seven matches came mostly in August. He played some useful innings — for example, his 52 and 35 opening the batting in a five-wicket win over Somerset at Taunton — but never went on to record a really big score. He did, however, take his two first-class wickets that season, both in the same innings at Edgbaston: those of Warwickshire Test cricketers Willie Quaife and Dick Lilley.

Caldwell was born in Altrincham, Cheshire; he died at the age of 85 in Littlemore, Oxfordshire.
