= Stanley Porthouse =

English cricketer

Stanley Clive Porthouse (14 August 1910 - ?? June 1993) was an English first-class cricketer: a right-handed batsman who played five first-class games for Worcestershire in 1934 and 1935. He had a top score of 27 from his eight innings, and averaged exactly 10.

Porthouse was born in Redditch, Worcestershire; he died in Worcester at the age of 82.
