= Edwin Wakelin =

English cricketer

Cricket information
- Batting: Right-handed

Career statistics
| Competition | First-class |
|---|---|
| Matches | 1 |
| Runs scored | 6 |
| Batting average | 6.00 |
| 100s/50s | 0/0 |
| Top score | 6 |
| Catches/stumpings | 0/– |
- Source: Cricinfo, 7 November 2022

Edwin Wakelin (18 October 1880 – 13 August 1925) was an English first-class cricketer who played in one match for Worcestershire against Essex in 1910; he scored 6 in his only innings before being dismissed by Walter Mead.

Wakelin was born in Cowley St John, Oxford; he died aged just 44 in St Giles, also in Oxford.
