= John Thursfield =

English cricketer

Personal information
- Full name: John Hunt Thursfield
- Born: 16 June 1892; Alvechurch, Worcestershire, England
- Died: 26 April 1951 (aged 58); Shenstone, Staffordshire, England
- Batting: Right-handed

Domestic team information
- Years: Team
- 1922–1925: Worcestershire

Career statistics
Competition	FC
Matches	3
Runs scored	70
Batting average	11.66
100s/50s	0/0
Top score	35
Balls bowled	0
Wickets	0
Bowling average	-
5 wickets in innings	0
10 wickets in match	0
Best bowling	-
Catches/stumpings	1/0
- Source: , 31 July 2008

John Hunt Thursfield (16 June 1892 – 26 April 1951) was an English first-class cricketer who played in three matches for Worcestershire in the 1920s. His debut was against Warwickshire at Edgbaston in May 1922 when he scored 35 in the first innings and took a catch to dismiss Freddie Calthorpe. He was awarded an MC in the Great War, on 3 June 1916.⟨2⟩

== Notes ==
2. Wisden on the Great War:the lives of cricket's fallen 1914–1918.
