= Fred Cooper (cricketer, born 1921) =

English cricketer

Cricket information
- Batting: Right-handed
- Bowling: Leg-break

Career statistics
Competition	First-class
Matches	44
Runs scored	1,369
Batting average	19.28
100s/50s	1/6
Top score	113*
Balls bowled	30
Wickets	0
Bowling average	–
5 wickets in innings	–
10 wickets in match	–
Best bowling	–
Catches/stumpings	17/–
- Source: Cricinfo, 14 April 2023

Fred Cooper (18 April 1921 – 22 December 1986) was an English cricketer who played first-class cricket for Lancashire and Worcestershire shortly after the Second World War.

Cooper had played for Lancashire's Second XI as a teenager before the war, but his first-class debut came for that county against Oxford University in May 1946; he made 6 and 20 not out. Later that season he made his County Championship bow against Leicestershire, playing three Championship games in total, all in July. However, he left the county for Worcestershire at the end of the season.

1947 saw Cooper score 380 runs in his 26 innings at an average of 18.09. The following summer he had his best season in county cricket, hitting 618 runs at 22.88 including his only first-class century: 113 not out in the second innings against Nottinghamshire; his brother and teammate Edwin had made exactly 100 in the first innings of the same match. 1948 also saw Cooper selected for West of England against East of England, the last such first-class match. He made 53 and 16, but the West were beaten by 223 runs.

In the 1949 and 1950 seasons, Cooper played only intermittently for the Worcestershire first team, spending a considerable amount of time turning out for the Second XI in the Minor Counties Championship. He made one first-class half-century in each season, but he was dismissed for single-figure scores in 13 of his 20 innings, and after the 1950 season his time in first-class cricket came to an end.

Cooper was born in Bacup, Lancashire; he died in Stourport-on-Severn, Worcestershire at the age of 65.

His brother Edwin had a much longer career with Worcestershire, playing 249 times for the county.
