= Lloyd Rudge =

English cricketer

Personal information
- Born: 11 February 1934; Walsall, Staffordshire, England
- Died: 15 October 1990 (aged 56); Worcester, England
- Batting: Right-handed
- Bowling: Right arm fast

Career statistics
Competition	First-class
Matches	1
Runs scored	1
Batting average	1.00
100s/50s	0/0
Top score	1
Balls bowled	72
Wickets	0
Bowling average	–
5 wickets in innings	–
10 wickets in match	–
Best bowling	–
Catches/stumpings	0/–
- Source: Cricinfo, 7 November 2022

Lloyd Maurice Rudge (11 February 1934 – 15 October 1990) was an English first-class cricketer who played a single first-class match for Worcestershire against Combined Services in 1952.

For his only match, the county sent out an extremely youthful team, with six of their players under the age of 21. In reply to Worcestershire's total of 299, the Services batsmen piled on the runs, with three batsmen making hundreds and successive partnerships of 100, 160, 109, 100 and 79* before declaring with their score on 548/4. Rudge did not take a wicket, but he was the most economical of all Worcestershire's bowlers, with figures of 12-2-36-0.

== Personal life and death ==
Rudge was born in Walsall, Staffordshire; he died in Worcester at the age of 56. At the time of his only first-class cricket appearance, he was an engineering student.
