= Derek Isles =

English cricketer

Personal information
- Born: 14 October 1943 (age 83); Bradford, Yorkshire, England
- Role: Wicket-keeper

Domestic team information
- Years: Team
- 1967: Worcestershire

Career statistics
| Competition | FC |
|---|---|
| Matches | 1 |
| Runs scored | 21 |
| Batting average | - |
| 100s/50s | 0/0 |
| Top score | 17* |
| Balls bowled | 0 |
| Wickets | 0 |
| Bowling average | - |
| 5 wickets in innings | 0 |
| 10 wickets in match | 0 |
| Best bowling | - |
| Catches/stumpings | 1/1 |
- Source: CricketArchive, 16 November 2008

Derek Isles (born 14 October 1943) is a former English cricketer: a wicket-keeper who played a single first-class match, for Worcestershire against the Pakistanis at Worcester in 1967.

In the game against the Pakistanis, his most notable achievement was his second-innings stumping of opener and captain Hanif Mohammad. He also took one catch, and made 17 and 4; both innings were not out meaning that he does not have a career batting average.

In the Minor Counties and Second XI Championships, Isles played for the seconds of no fewer than five counties between 1962 and 1968.
