= Richard Williams (cricketer, born 1901) =

English cricketer

Personal information
- Full name: Richard Harry Williams
- Born: 23 April 1901; Brockmoor, Staffordshire, England
- Died: 19 December 1982 (aged 81); Stourbridge, England
- Batting: Left-handed

Domestic team information
- Years: Team
- 1923–1932: Worcestershire

Career statistics
Competition	FC
Matches	37
Runs scored	713
Batting average	11.14
100s/50s	0/3
Top score	81
Balls bowled	0
Wickets	0
Bowling average	-
5 wickets in innings	0
10 wickets in match	0
Best bowling	-
Catches/stumpings	17/0
- Source: , 1 August 2008

Richard Harry Williams (23 April 1901 – 19 December 1982) was an English first-class cricketer who played 37 matches for Worcestershire between 1923 and 1932. He averaged barely 11 in his career, though his obituary in Wisden suggested that he had played "some useful innings".

Williams' career began very badly. In his first game, against Derbyshire, he made 4 and 2* in 1923. He did not appear again until 1925, when in his first nine innings of the season he made just 13 runs. He brought this dreadful sequence to a close with 23 against Sussex in early June, then followed it up with the first of just three half-centuries: 56 versus Nottinghamshire.

This innings was a false dawn, however, and in Williams' next 30 innings he never made more than 41. By now it was August 1926, but then – admittedly after the match was dead — he produced what was to be his career-best innings: 81 against Nottinghamshire (again) at Trent Bridge. Another lengthy run of failures followed, and although he made an unbeaten 76 against Yorkshire in early May 1928, he was out of the side again by the start of June.

Williams was to make only three more first-class appearances: two in 1931 and one in 1932. His four innings produced scores of 2, 0, 0 and 1, bringing an unhappy end to his largely unsuccessful career in county cricket.
