= Mark Bullock =

English cricketer

Career statistics
Competition	First-class
Matches	4
Runs scored	59
Batting average	9.83
100s/50s	0/0
Top score	27
Catches/stumpings	1/–
- Source: CricInfo, 6 December 2022

Mark Bullock (24 October 1872 – 22 April 1925) was an English cricketer: a batsman who played four first-class matches for Worcestershire in 1900. His top score of 21 came on debut against Leicestershire and proved important, as Worcestershire won a low-scoring game by just ten runs.

He was born in Dudley, then in Worcestershire, and died in Leicester at the age of 52.
