= Greg Watson =

Personal information
- Born: 29 January 1955 (age 71); Gulgong, New South Wales, Australia
- Batting: Right-handed
- Bowling: Right-arm fast-medium

Career statistics
Competition	First-class	List A
Matches	45	8
Runs scored	552	19
Batting average	12.83	4.75
100s/50s	0/0	0/0
Top score	38	7
Balls bowled	7,762	465
Wickets	102	21
Bowling average	37.56	11.38
5 wickets in innings	1	1
10 wickets in match	0	0
Best bowling	6/45	5/22
Catches/stumpings	12/–	0/–
- Source: Cricinfo, 4 December 2012

Gregory George Watson (born 29 January 1955) is a former Australian first-class cricketer who played domestically for New South Wales and Western Australia, as well as for Worcestershire in English county cricket.

== Biography ==
Born in Gulgong, New South Wales, Watson made his first-class debut for New South Wales at the Adelaide Oval against South Australia in the 1977-78 Sheffield Shield. He took four wickets, his maiden victim being opposing captain Ashley Woodcock, but did not bat in either innings. He played a further six games in the Shield, capturing another 13 wickets, and made a single List A appearance in the Gillette Cup, taking 1-25 from 8 eight-ball overs.

In 1978, Watson went to England to play county cricket for Worcestershire. He had a reasonably successful season, taking 48 first-class wickets at just under 32 in 21 games, including a career-best 6–45 against Sussex in early August. He also made his highest score with the bat: 38 against Somerset. In one-day cricket he had great success, claiming 19 wickets at a mere 9.52 apiece, including 5-22 (again a career best) against Combined Universities in the Benson & Hedges Cup, a performance which won him the man-of-the-match award.

The defection of many of the senior Australian players to join World Series Cricket in 1977 led to speculation that Watson would be a contender for the Australian team in the 1978–79 Ashes series against England. However, after impressive early performances, Watson had a disappointing season in 1978–79, taking only 13 first-class wickets for New South Wales at average just under 50. He returned for another season with Worcestershire in 1979, but played only nine times in first-class cricket (taking 22 wickets at 37.50) and not at all in the one-day format; from mid-July onwards he had to satisfy himself with Second XI games.

Watson was to play only one more match: a single outing in the 1979-80 Sheffield Shield for Western Australia against Queensland at Perth. The game was drawn, and Watson had a rather poor match: he conceded 135 runs from 30 six-ball overs and had only the second-innings wickets of Ray Phillips and Alec Parker to show for it. Watson never played first-class cricket again but continued to play English league cricket semi-professionally with Billingham, Crewe, Stourbridge and Smethwick.

After his cricket career ended, he worked as a metallurgist and systems analyst.
