= Eddie Cooper (cricketer) =

English cricketer

Edwin Cooper (30 November 1915 – 29 October 1968) was an English cricketer: a right-handed batsman who played 249 first-class matches for Worcestershire (and one for North of England) between 1936 and 1951. His total of 13,304 runs at 31.98 included 18 hundreds.

Born in Bacup, Lancashire, Cooper made his first-class debut for Worcestershire against Oxford University in May 1936, making 2 and 28. That was his only outing that season, but in 1937 he was a regular in the team and was awarded his county cap as well as making 1,321 runs: he passed the 1,000 mark in all of his subsequent seasons. In 1938, he made his highest score, 216 not out, against Warwickshire, and again did well in 1939 before the Second World War brought a halt to first-class cricket.

Cooper was able to resume his Worcestershire career in 1946 and, while he rather missed out on the runs in 1947 (averaging barely 26), two years later he had his finest season in the game, scoring 1,916 runs at 43.54 and passing 50 on 17 occasions. He rounded off his career with two more satisfactory summers, as well as a benefit season (which raised £3,000) in his final year of 1951. He left the first-class game in some style, making 124 against Northamptonshire in his final innings.

He stood once as a first-class umpire, at Worcestershire's game against Cambridge University in 1950. His brother, Fred, who played 44 first-class games, opened the batting for Worcestershire in that match.

Cooper died in Birmingham at the age of 52.
