= David Wheeldon =

English cricketer

David Wheeldon (born 12 April 1989) is an English cricketer. He is a left-handed batsman and leg-break bowler who played for Worcestershire. He was born in Staffordshire.

Wheeldon made his cricketing debut in the Under-15s County Cup in 2004, and played in the Under-17 County Championship for Staffordshire between 2005 and 2006.

Having represented Worcestershire Second XI throughout the 2007 and 2008 seasons, Wheeldon made his first-class debut in 2009 against Oxford UCCE, scoring 22 runs in his debut innings for the team.

He was released from the Worcestershire playing staff at the end of the 2010 season.
