= William Thomas (cricketer) =

English cricketer

Personal information
- Full name: William Richard Keay Thomas
- Born: 22 July 1960 (age 66); Redditch, Worcestershire, England
- Batting: Right-handed
- Bowling: Right-arm medium

Domestic team information
- Years: Team
- 1981: Worcestershire

Career statistics
Competition	FC
Matches	1
Runs scored	57
Batting average	57.00
100s/50s	0/0
Top score	44
Balls bowled	102
Wickets	0
Bowling average	-
5 wickets in innings	0
10 wickets in match	0
Best bowling	-
Catches/stumpings	0/0
- Source: CricketArchive, 20 November 2008

William Richard Keay Thomas (born 22 July 1960) is a former English first-class cricketer who played in one match for Worcestershire against the Sri Lankans at Worcester in early July 1981. In a drawn game, he scored a useful 44 from number eight in the first innings, and made 13 not out in the second.

The game mentioned above was Thomas's only first-team outing, but he made numerous appearances for Worcestershire's Second XI, on one occasion in 1980 taking 7/72 against Yorkshire II.
