= Gerald Seeley =

English cricketer

Personal information
- Full name: Gerald Henry Seeley
- Born: 9 May 1903; Port Blair, Andaman Islands
- Died: 23 July 1941 (aged 38); English Channel, off Ostend, German-occupied Belgium
- Batting: Right-handed

Domestic team information
- Years: Team
- 1921: Worcestershire

Career statistics
Competition	First-class
Matches	1
Runs scored	7
Batting average	7.00
100s/50s	0/0
Top score	7
Catches/stumpings	0/0
- Source: CricketArchive, 24 June 2008

Gerald Henry Seeley (9 May 1903 – 23 July 1941) was an English cricketer who played a single first-class game, for Worcestershire against Nottinghamshire at Worcester in 1921. Batting at number seven in his only innings, he scored 7 before falling lbw to John Gunn. Although this was his only appearance at such a high level, he did play several times for Marlborough College and in 1921, a fortnight before his Worcestershire appearance, he hit 122 and took 5–59 against Rugby School.

Seeley was born at Port Blair. in the Andaman Islands.

== Military service and death ==
In the Second World War he became an air gunner in the Royal Air Force, and became a pilot officer. On 23 July 1941, Seeley took off from RAF Manston as the rear air gunner of a Bristol Blenheim bomber. Whilst conducting anti-shipping operations over the English Channel, the Blenheim was shot down off Ostend by a Kriegsmarine flak ship, killing 2 of the 3 on board, Seeley and pilot Phillip Bernard Ashby. Pilot Officer Martin Lowes became a prisoner of war. He is buried in the Oostende New Communal Cemetery.
