= Frank Ahl =

South African-born English cricketer

Frank Douglas Ahl (24 November 1908 – 3 May 1967) was a South African-born English first-class cricketer. He was a right-handed batsman, right arm bowler and occasional wicket-keeper who played 35 times for Worcestershire between 1931 and 1933.

Born in Potchefstroom, Transvaal, his highest first-class score was 43 and he took 13 wickets, his best bowling being 4–44 against Yorkshire in June 1933.

He died after collapsing on the golf course at Stanwell, Middlesex, aged 58.
