= Guy Thornycroft =

English cricketer

Guy Thonycroft
Cricket information
- Batting: Right-handed

Career statistics
Competition	First-class
Matches	1
Runs scored	3
Batting average	1.50
100s/50s	0/0
Top score	3
Catches/stumpings	0/–
- Source: Cricinfo, 8 November 2022

Guy Mytton Thornycroft (1 April 1917 – 8 January 1999) was an English first-class cricketer who played in one match for Worcestershire against the Combined Services at Hereford in 1947. He scored 0 and 3 in a heavy Worcestershire defeat.

Thornycroft was born in Blawith, Grange-over-Sands, which was then in Lancashire; he died at the age of 81 in Reading.
