= Mark Scott (cricketer) =

English cricketer (born 1959)

Personal information
- Full name: Mark Stephen Scott
- Born: 10 March 1959 (age 67); Muswell Hill, Middlesex, England
- Batting: Right-handed
- Bowling: Right-arm off-break

Career statistics
Competition	First-class	List A
Matches	32	24
Runs scored	1,383	392
Batting average	24.26	16.33
100s/50s	1/9	0/0
Top score	109	42
Balls bowled	60	0
Wickets	0	–
Bowling average	–	–
5 wickets in innings	0	–
10 wickets in match	0	–
Best bowling	–	–
Catches/stumpings	9/–	3/–
- Source: Cricinfo

Mark Stephen Scott (born 10 March 1959 in) is an English first-class cricketer who played county cricket for Worcestershire in the early 1980s.

== Biography ==
Scott was born on 10 March 1959, in Muswell Hill. He appeared on a number of occasions for the Second XIs of Middlesex and Glamorgan between 1977 and 1980 before moving to Worcestershire, for whom he made his first-class debut in June 1981 against Surrey at The Oval. Opening the batting, Scott made 46 and 52, and retained his place for much of the rest of the season thanks to some solid scores including what was to prove his only first-class century, 109 against Gloucestershire in mid-July. He finished the 1981 season with 968 first-class runs at 26.08, including that hundred and six further half-centuries though his one-day form was less impressive as his top score was only 42.

Scott began the 1982 season fairly well established in the Worcestershire side, but a succession of low scores saw him play only occasionally from mid-season onwards. In 1983 he forced his way back into the first team, but again did poorly, making a pair against Nottinghamshire in July in what turned out to be his penultimate first-class match (he made 23 and 21 in his last, against Essex in late August).

Scott left Worcestershire for Sussex in 1984, and remained for 1985 as well, but never played a first-team game for that county and after a year out of county cricket he returned to New Road in 1987 to begin an unusual final chapter of his Worcestershire career. He never played first-team cricket for the county again, but for six seasons he captained the Second XI, often coming in at the bottom of the order despite his batting ability. Against Hampshire II in 1991 he made 2 from number 11 in the first innings, then when Worcestershire followed on he opened the batting and hit 181! He amassed 61 not outs from 94 innings during these years in the seconds.

In 1993, Scott was part of the victorious Old Hill team which beat local rivals West Bromwich Dartmouth in the final of the Abbot Ale National Club Championship at Lord's, and six years later he made one final List A appearance for the Worcestershire Cricket Board XI against Hampshire Cricket Board in the NatWest Trophy.

Scott is one of very few Level 4 cricket coaches in the world and is now coaching the Gresham's School First XI cricket team in Holt, a small town in Norfolk, England. He took the First XI on a tour to Barbados (#YOBO) for their pre-season in his first week with the team and that turned out to be a successful tour, in which Frankie Sutton failed to score a 100.
