= Stephen Watkins =

English cricketer

Personal information
- Full name: Stephen George Watkins
- Born: 23 March 1959 (age 67); Hereford, England
- Batting: Right-handed
- Bowling: Right-arm medium

Domestic team information
- Years: Team
- 1983: Worcestershire

Career statistics
Competition	FC	LA
Matches	1	1
Runs scored	105	24
Batting average	52.50	24.00
100s/50s	0/1	0/0
Top score	77	24
Balls bowled	0	0
Wickets	0	0
Bowling average	-	-
5 wickets in innings	0	0
10 wickets in match	0	N/A
Best bowling	-	-
Catches/stumpings	0/0	0/0
- Source: CricketArchive, 24 November 2008

Stephen George Watkins (born 23 March 1959) was a former English cricketer who played one first-class and one List A match for Worcestershire in 1983.

Watkins' solitary first-class appearance came against Oxford University in the middle of June 1983. Watkins, batting at two, had quite a successful match, scoring 77 and 28. Nevertheless, he never played first-class cricket again, and his only other game in senior cricket was a John Player Special League match against Kent in early August, in which he made 24.

He left Worcestershire after the 1983 season, but later played minor counties cricket for Wales Minor Counties and Herefordshire.
