= William Richardson (Worcestershire cricketer) =

English cricketer

Personal information
- Full name: William Ethelbert Richardson
- Born: 23 December 1894; St Helens, Lancashire, England
- Died: 5 November 1971 (aged 76); Hartlebury, Worcestershire, England
- Batting: Right-handed
- Bowling: Right-arm fast

Domestic team information
- Years: Team
- 1920–1928: Worcestershire

Career statistics
Competition	FC
Matches	30
Runs scored	269
Batting average	6.56
100s/50s	0/0
Top score	24
Balls bowled	2,730
Wickets	44
Bowling average	42.38
5 wickets in innings	1
10 wickets in match	0
Best bowling	6/48
Catches/stumpings	9/0
- Source: CricketArchive, 22 November 2008

William Ethelbert Richardson (23 December 1894 – 5 November 1971) was an English cricketer who played first-class cricket for Worcestershire between 1920 and 1928.

The great bulk of Richardson's first-class career came between 1920 and 1922, and indeed the 23 wickets he claimed in his debut season formed more than half his career aggregate, while the 15 matches he played in 1920 were exactly half his final tally. After a wicketless debut against Hampshire in May 1920, his next game was against Gloucestershire. He took nine wickets in the match, including what was to remain a career-best 6/48 in the second innings.

After 1922 Richardson did not appear at first-class level again until 1926, when he played one match. He also turned out once in 1927 and twice in 1928. After that, he played occasionally at minor level for Gentlemen of Worcestershire, taking six wickets against Bromsgrove School in a single-innings game in 1929.
