= Christopher Liptrot =

English cricketer

Personal information
- Full name: Christopher George Liptrot
- Born: 13 February 1980 (age 46); Wigan, Greater Manchester
- Batting: Left-handed
- Bowling: Right-arm fast-medium

Career statistics
Competition	First-class	List A
Matches	30	9
Runs scored	303	23
Batting average	12.12	23.00
100s/50s	0/1	0/0
Top score	61	15*
Balls bowled	3,899	259
Wickets	69	8
Bowling average	32.55	29.75
5 wickets in innings	2	0
10 wickets in match	0	0
Best bowling	6/44	3/44
Catches/stumpings	11/–	2/–
- Source: , 16 August 2022

Christopher George Liptrot (born 13 February 1980), sometimes known as Chris Liptrot, is an English former cricketer who played for Worcestershire. He was born in Wigan, Greater Manchester. His short career was plagued by a persistent back problem which eventually forced his premature retirement.

Liptrot made his first-class debut early in the 1999 season against Oxford University. Although he took only the wicket of tail-ender Tom Hicks in each innings, he was retained in the Worcestershire side for the County Championship matches which followed. His best performance was later in April, when he took 5–51 on the only day of four in which play was possible in a weather-ruined game against Surrey. After mid-June, however, he dropped out of the first team, although he did play three Youth Tests and three Youth ODIs for England U-19s with fair success against their Australian counterparts.

2000 saw Liptrot still in the seconds, failing to capitalise on one first-class opportunity in June when he went wicketless against the touring West Indians. However, some good performances followed at Second XI level, including two seven-wicket innings hauls, and these saw him force his way into the first team in mid-August. At last making his first List A appearance against Sussex, he took the wicket of opposing captain Chris Adams, but was frustrated as only 3.1 overs were bowled before the match was called off. Over the next few days, however, he recorded his career-best returns in both first-class cricket (6-44 against Warwickshire) and the one-day format (3-44 against Kent).

Liptrot bowled more in 2001 than in any other season, and although he never dismissed more than three batsmen in an innings he nevertheless managed to total 35 first-class wickets at 27.60 over the course of the summer. This promise was never fulfilled: he appeared hardly at all in 2002 and 2003 (though he did play a handful of Twenty20 games in the latter year) and after the end of the 2003 season he announced his injury-enforced retirement from the game.

Liptrot is now pursuing a career in the rail industry.
