= Bernard Nevile =

English cricketer

Cricket information
- Bowling: Right-arm fast

Career statistics
Competition	First-class
Matches	6
Runs scored	65
Batting average	8.12
100s/50s	0/0
Top score	17*
Balls bowled	260
Wickets	7
Bowling average	21.28
5 wickets in innings	0
10 wickets in match	0
Best bowling	4/53
Catches/stumpings	1/–
- Source: Cricinfo, 7 November 2022

Captain Bernard Philip Nevile (1 August 1888 – 11 February 1916) was an English first-class cricketer who played five games for Worcestershire in 1913, and another for Free Foresters a year earlier. He also played for and captained Lincolnshire in the Minor Counties Championship.

== Career ==
Born at Wellingore Hall, Lincolnshire, Nevile made his first-class debut in June 1912, playing for Free Foresters against Cambridge University, scoring 4 in his only innings and bowling a single over without reward. He attended Cambridge himself, not getting into the First XI, but gaining a blue for golf.

The following season he appeared five times for Worcestershire, but only twice made an impression. Against Kent in mid-July he took 3–29 in the first innings (his maiden wicket being that of opener Punter Humphreys); and against Surrey a fortnight later, in what proved to be his final game, he claimed a career-best 4-53.

Nevile joined the Army in World War I, and served in the Lincolnshire Regiment. He was killed near Ypres, Belgium at the age of just 27.

His brother Charles also played for Lincolnshire at minor counties level, but did not make a first-class appearance.
