= Thomas Stringer (cricketer) =

English cricketer

Cricket information
- Bowling: Leg-break

Career statistics
Competition	First-class
Matches	1
Runs scored	0
Batting average	0.00
100s/50s	0/0
Top score	0*
Balls bowled	138
Wickets	1
Bowling average	103.00
5 wickets in innings	0
10 wickets in match	0
Best bowling	1/103
Catches/stumpings	0/–
- Source: Cricinfo, 7 November 2022

Thomas Stringer (born 22 February 1873) was an English first-class cricketer who played in one match for Worcestershire in 1909.

Born in Lepton, Huddersfield, Stringer played one match for the Yorkshire Second XI in 1902, taking four wickets against Surrey II, but it was only seven years later that he made his solitary first-class appearance, for Worcestershire against Lancashire at Amblecote. Worcestershire were crushed by an innings and 183 runs, and Stringer's only innings of bowling brought him figures of 1–103, his one and only victim in first-class cricket being future Test player Harry Makepeace. With the bat, Stringer made 0 and 0*.
