= Gerald Humphries =

English cricketer

Cricket information
- Batting: Right-handed
- Bowling: Right-arm medium

Career statistics
Competition	First-class
Matches	2
Runs scored	66
Batting average	22.00
100s/50s	0/0
Top score	36
Balls bowled	18
Wickets	0
Bowling average	–
5 wickets in innings	–
10 wickets in match	–
Best bowling	–
Catches/stumpings	0/–
- Source: CricInfo, 7 November 2022

Gerald Harvey Humphries (8 December 1908 – 3 February 1983) was an English first-class cricketer who played two matches for Worcestershire in the 1930s. He made 26 and 4 in the first game against Sussex, while in the second two years later he hit 36 in his only innings.

He captained Kidderminster Cricket Club either side of the Second World War, and was a member of the Worcestershire committee.

Humphries was born in Kidderminster; he died aged 74 a few miles away in Rock.

Two of his brothers played first-class cricket for Worcestershire: Cedric made 13 appearances in 1934 and 1935 (though he did not play in Gerald's 1934 match), while Norman played seven times in 1946.
