= Gordon Griffiths =

English cricketer

Gordon Craven Griffiths (19 June 1905 – 10 September 1994) was an English first-class cricketer. He was a right-handed batsman and wicket-keeper who played five times for Worcestershire between 1932 and 1935. He never made a significant impact on a game with the bat, having a top score of just 16 from his ten innings and finishing with a batting average of a mere 4.20. Indeed, Worcestershire lost every match in which Griffiths played, four of them by an innings.

Griffiths was born in King's Norton (then Worcestershire, now part of Birmingham); he died in Stratford-on-Avon, Warwickshire at the age of 89.
