= Evelyn Carmichael =

English cricketer

Cricket information
- Batting: Right-handed
- Bowling: Right-arm medium

Career statistics
Competition	First-class
Matches	1
Runs scored	6
Batting average	3.00
100s/50s	0/0
Top score	5
Catches/stumpings	1/–
- Source: Cricinfo, 13 April 2023

Evelyn George Massey Carmichael (of Carmichael) (3 April 1871 – 14 July 1959) was an English cricketer who played a single first-class game, for Worcestershire against Oxford University in 1903; in the first innings he was bowled for 5 by his namesake Evelyn Martin (who also played for Worcestershire that season), while in the second he was run out for 1. He took one catch, to dismiss Martin.

Carmichael also played for Worcestershire in the 1890s, before they had attained first-class status. He was educated at Harrow before going up to Oxford, although he did not excel at cricket while at either establishment.

He was also a barrister, and took great interest in the history of the Carmichael family. On his death, he determined that all his family research was to go to the Lord Lyon King of Arms.

As a direct descendant of James Carmichael Smyth, MD, buried at Gatton with his wife, he also inherited the effects of Sir James Carmichael Smyth, the noted abolitionist governor of the Bahamas.

Carmichael was born in Upper Wick, Worcester; he died aged 88 at Berrington Hall, Shrewsbury.
