= John Davis (Worcestershire cricketer) =

English cricketer

Cricket information
- Batting: Right-handed

Career statistics
Competition	First-class
Matches	4
Runs scored	48
Batting average	6.85
100s/50s	0/0
Top score	38*
Balls bowled	60
Wickets	0
Bowling average	–
5 wickets in innings	–
10 wickets in match	–
Best bowling	–
Catches/stumpings	0/–
- Source: Cricinfo, 15 April 2023

John Percy Davis (26 January 1884 – 16 February 1951) was an English cricketer who played four first-class matches for Worcestershire in 1922. His most significant performance was the 38 not out he made against Warwickshire in the second innings of his debut match.

Davis was born in Lye, Worcestershire; he died at the age of 67 in nearby Heath, Stourbridge.

His brother Major Davis played once for Worcestershire in 1911.
