= Norman Humphries =

English cricketer

Personal information
- Full name: Norman Hampton Humphries
- Born: 19 May 1917; Kidderminster, Worcestershire, England
- Died: 18 December 2000 (aged 83); Seaton, Devon, England
- Batting: Right-handed
- Bowling: Leg-break

Domestic team information
- Years: Team
- 1946: Worcestershire

Career statistics
Competition	First-class
Matches	7
Runs scored	137
Batting average	13.70
100s/50s	0/0
Top score	22
Balls bowled	54
Wickets	0
Bowling average	–
5 wickets in innings	–
10 wickets in match	–
Best bowling	–
Catches/stumpings	1/–
- Source: CricketArchive, 21 November 2008

Norman Hampton Humphries (19 May 1917 – 18 December 2000) was an English cricketer who played first-class cricket for Worcestershire in 1946. He also played minor counties cricket for Devon between 1938 and 1955.

Humphries made his debut near the end of June 1946, against Warwickshire at Edgbaston, and scored 21 in his only innings. After making 3 in the first innings of his next game, against Glamorgan, he showed quite some consistency, his next five innings being 22, 16, 17, 22 and 16. However, he was unable to break through and produce a significant score, and after this one season he was never again to appear at first-class level.

For Devon, however, it could be a different story, and in June 1949 Humphries produced his finest form. First he hit 199 against Kent II, and immediately thereafter he struck 216 not out, carrying his bat against Surrey II. By coincidence, in this game Alan Brazier made 216 not out in Surrey II's own first innings!

Two brothers, Cedric and Gerald, also played for Worcestershire.
