= Philip John Whitcombe =

English cricketer (1928–2008)

Philip Whitcombe
Personal information
- Full name: Philip John Whitcombe
- Born: 11 November 1928; Worcester, England
- Died: 24 July 2008 (aged 79); Brentwood, Essex, England
- Batting: Right-handed

Domestic team information
- Years: Team
- 1949–1952: Worcestershire
- 1950–1952: Oxford University
- FC debut: 18 June 1949 Worcestershire v Cambridge University
- Last FC: 29 August 1952 Worcestershire v Hampshire

Career statistics
Competition	First-class
Matches	34
Runs scored	1,156
Batting average	24.59
100s/50s	1/7
Top score	104
Balls bowled	8
Wickets	1
Bowling average	10.00
5 wickets in innings	0
10 wickets in match	0
Best bowling	1/8
Catches/stumpings	30/9
- Source: CricketArchive, 27 September 2007

Philip John Whitcombe (11 November 1928 – 24 July 2008) was an English first-class cricketer who played 34 matches between 1949 and 1953. 26 of these were for Oxford University, and eight for Worcestershire. He was a wicket-keeper, though he did play in some games as a batsman only. He died in July 2008, at the age of 79.

== Cricket career ==
Whitcombe attended the Royal Grammar School Worcester before going up to Hertford College, Oxford. He made his first-class cricket debut for Worcestershire against Cambridge University at Worcester in June 1949. In a drawn game, he held three catches and scored 4 and 8*. The following season, he appeared seven times for Oxford and claimed 11 dismissals, as well as scoring three half-centuries, the highest of which was 68 against Marylebone Cricket Club (MCC) at Lord's. He did not, however, play in the Varsity Match.

In 1951, he made ten first-class appearances, all for his university. He had a fine match, albeit in a losing cause, against Hampshire at Basingstoke in late June: opening the batting in both innings, he hit 42 and 104, his only first-class century. However, his highest score in 15 other innings that summer was a mere 35, and though he did play in the Varsity Match this time he failed twice, making 10 and 5. His 18 dismissals (14 caught; four stumped) was the best season's aggregate of his career.

Whitcombe played the first half of 1952 for Oxford, making nine appearances for them, then turned out on seven occasions for Worcestershire in August. He made 60 in two successive innings for the university, but for his county failed on all but his first and last appearances. He scored 73 for Worcestershire against Essex at New Road, and later, in what proved to be his final first-class game, he hit 37 and 89* against Hampshire at Bournemouth.

Whitcombe played all but one of his Worcestershire matches in 1952 as a batsman, with Hugo Yarnold usually behind the stumps. For Oxford Whitcombe kept wicket, although playing for the university against Lancashire in May, he took his only first-class wicket when with the match lost he came on to bowl (Alan Jones taking the gloves) and had Malcolm Hilton stumped for 11.

After his first-class career was over, Whitcombe played a few times in the 1960s for a representative Club Cricket Conference side against touring teams, and once against MCC. The first of these matches was a single-innings affair at Blackheath between the Club Cricket Conference and the Australians in July 1961. The tourists put out a strong side including five players who had appeared in the immediately preceding third Test (captain Richie Benaud, Bill Lawry, Norm O'Neill, Peter Burge and Garth McKenzie). Benaud set the Club Cricket Conference a target of 150 in 100 minutes, and Whitcombe's 71 ensured that they squeaked home with a single minute to spare.

== Career after first-class cricket ==
Whitcombe taught English at Brentwood School until his retirement in the late 1980s and he was master in charge of cricket.
