= Alexander Wilkes =

English cricketer

Cricket information
- Batting: Right-handed

Career statistics
Competition	First-class
Matches	11
Runs scored	113
Batting average	5.65
100s/50s	0/0
Top score	25
Catches/stumpings	13/–
- Source: CricketArchive, 8 November 2022

Alexander John Wilkes (4 November 1900 – 12 July 1937) was an English first-class cricketer who played 11 matches for Worcestershire, three in 1925 and eight in 1927. He was not a success, with a top score of only 25 in 22 innings, and Worcestershire lost every game in which he appeared.

Wilkes was born in Kidderminster, Worcestershire, and died in the same town at the early age of 36.
