= Geoffrey Sheppard =

English cricketer

Personal information
- Full name: Geoffrey Allan Sheppard
- Born: 18 December 1890; Glasgow, Scotland
- Died: 22 May 1940 (aged 49); Newbury, Berkshire, England
- Batting: Right-handed
- Role: Batsman

Domestic team information
- Years: Team
- 1919: Worcestershire
- FC debut: 23 June 1919 Worcestershire v Gloucestershire
- Last FC: 8 July 1919 Worcestershire v Somerset

Career statistics
Competition	First-class
Matches	2
Runs scored	18
Batting average	4.50
100s/50s	0/0
Top score	11
Catches/stumpings	2/–
- Source: CricketArchive, 12 September 2007

Geoffrey Allan Sheppard (18 December 1890 – 22 May 1940) was an English first-class cricketer who played two matches for Worcestershire in 1919, both at New Road. His highest score was 11 in the first of his four innings, against Gloucestershire.
