= George Blakey =

English cricketer

George Matthew Blakey (20 January 1907 – 12 January 1968) was an English cricketer: a right-handed batsman and right arm bowler who played three first-class games for Worcestershire, all in July 1939. He totalled 46 runs in his four innings, of which 42 came in a single effort, on his debut against Surrey.

Prior to his brief first-class career, Blakey had also played in the Minor Counties Championship for the Lancashire Second XI in 1929 and 1930.

He was born in St Anne's-on-Sea, Lancashire and died at Meir, Stoke-on-Trent, Staffordshire a few days short of his 61st birthday.
