= Percy Wakefield =

English cricketer

Personal information
- Full name: Percy Harold Wakefield
- Born: 3 September 1888; Pill, Somerset, England
- Died: 20 December 1973 (aged 85); Worcester, England
- Batting: Right-handed
- Bowling: Right-arm medium

Domestic team information
- Years: Team
- 1922: Worcestershire
- Only FC: 7 June 1922 Worcestershire v Hampshire

Career statistics
Competition	First-class
Matches	1
Runs scored	8
Batting average	4.00
100s/50s	0/0
Top score	8
Balls bowled	18
Wickets	0
Bowling average	–
5 wickets in innings	–
10 wickets in match	–
Best bowling	–
Catches/stumpings	1/–
- Source: CricketArchive, 12 September 2007

Percy Harold Wakefield (3 September 1888 – 20 December 1973) was an English first-class cricketer who played in one match for Worcestershire against Hampshire at New Road in 1922.

In a game most notable for Phil Mead's exploits for Hampshire — he scored 235 and shared in a last-wicket stand of 127 with Stuart Boyes — Wakefield's own contribution was minimal: he scored 0 and 8, sent down three wicketless overs, and held a catch to dismiss Hampshire captain Lord Tennyson.
