= William Mann (cricketer) =

English cricketer

Cricket information
- Batting: Right-handed

Career statistics
Competition	First-class
Matches	1
Runs scored	7
Batting average	3.50
100s/50s	0/0
Top score	4
Catches/stumpings	0/–
- Source: Cricinfo, 7 November 2022

William Horace Mann (28 July 1878 – 24 February 1938) was an English first-class cricketer who played a single first-class match, for Worcestershire against Hampshire in July 1924. Batting near the bottom of the order he made 4 in the first innings and 3 in the second.

Mann was born in Trowbridge, Wiltshire; he died in Canford Cliffs, Dorset at the age of 59.

He was commissioned a second lieutenant in the Royal Wiltshire Yeomanry (Prince of Wales's Own Royal Regiment) on 16 July 1902.
