= Richard Turner (Worcestershire cricketer) =

English cricketer

Personal information
- Full name: Richard Ernest Turner
- Born: 4 May 1886; Mitcham, Surrey, England
- Died: 16 March 1967 (aged 80); Hastings, Sussex, England
- Batting: Right-handed
- Bowling: Right arm medium

Domestic team information
- Years: Team
- 1909–1922: Worcestershire

Career statistics
Competition	FC
Matches	52
Runs scored	1,010
Batting average	11.47
100s/50s	0/2
Top score	66
Balls bowled	252
Wickets	4
Bowling average	56.25
5 wickets in innings	0
10 wickets in match	0
Best bowling	3-7
Catches/stumpings	13/0
- Source: , 11 September 2007

Richard Ernest Turner (4 May 1886 – 16 March 1967) was an English first-class cricketer who played 52 matches for Worcestershire either side of the First World War.

Turner made his debut against Kent at Amblecote on 5 July 1909; he scored 6 and 19 in an innings defeat. He made a further eight appearances that season, but did not reach 20 in any of them, ending the summer with an average of just 9.10. In 1910 he did a little better, hitting 49 not out against Warwickshire at Birmingham, but his best year was 1911, when he scored 463 runs at 15.43. This included his only two half-centuries, which were achieved in successive matches: 53 against Sussex at the end of May, then 66 versus Warwickshire a week later.

Though he had played 16 matches in 1911, Turner never again turned out more than eight times in a season. A single match in 1913 was his last for eight years, and although he returned for eight more games spread over 1921 and 1922, he could muster only 200 runs from 16 innings, with a highest score of 44 against Gloucestershire in June 1921; this was also the only occasion on which Turner acted as wicket-keeper.

Turner was a strictly occasional bowler, only turning his arm over at all in the three seasons from 1909 to 1911. Of his four first-class wickets, three came in the same innings in July 1911, when he accounted for Kent's Jack Hubble, Bill Fairservice and Charlie Blythe to finish with 3–7. Turner's other wicket had been that of Hampshire captain Edward Sprot in August 1909.
