= Major Davis =

English cricketer

Cricket information
- Batting: Right-handed

Career statistics
Competition	First-class
Matches	1
Runs scored	35
Batting average	17.50
100s/50s	0/0
Top score	29
Catches/stumpings	1/–
- Source: Cricinfo, 14 April 2023

Major Davis (27 March 1882 – 27 April 1959) was an English cricketer who played one first-class match, for Worcestershire against Oxford University in 1911. He scored 29 and 6, and took one catch, to dismiss Oxford captain John Evans.

Davis was born in Lye, then Worcestershire; he died at the age of 71 in Blakebrook, Kidderminster.

His brother John played four times for Worcestershire in 1922.

Note: it is not known whether "Major" was a name or a title.
