= Frank Summers (Australian footballer) =

Australian rules footballer

Personal information
- Born: 17 September 1930 (age 96)
- Original team: South City
- Height: 171 cm (5 ft 7 in)
- Weight: 67 kg (148 lb)

Playing career^{1}
Years	Club	Games (Goals)
1953	South Melbourne	2 (0)
- ^{1} Playing statistics correct to the end of 1953.

Frank Summers (born 17 September 1930) is a former Australian rules footballer who played with South Melbourne in the Victorian Football League (VFL).
