= Colin Scholey =

English cricketer

Personal information
- Full name: John Colin Scholey
- Born: 28 September 1930; Beeston, Leeds, Yorkshire, England
- Died: 7 September 2010 (aged 79); Halifax, West Yorkshire, England
- Batting: Right-handed
- Role: Wicket-keeper

Domestic team information
- Years: Team
- 1952–1953: Worcestershire
- FC debut: 3 May 1952 Worcestershire v Indians
- Last FC: 10 July 1953 Worcestershire v Lancashire

Career statistics
Competition	First-class
Matches	10
Runs scored	325
Batting average	6.40
100s/50s	0/0
Top score	16
Catches/stumpings	20/5
- Source: CricketArchive, 25 September 2007

John Colin Scholey (28 September 1930 – 7 September 2010) was an English first-class cricketer who played ten matches for Worcestershire as a wicket-keeper in the early 1950s.

He twice made five dismissals in an innings. The first occasion was against Sussex at Eastbourne in August 1952, when he claimed four catches and a stumping. The other was in what proved to be his final first-class game, against Lancashire at Worcester in July 1953; on this occasion all five of his victims were caught.

Scholey died on 7 September 2010, at the age of 79.
