= John Fereday =

English cricketer

John Benjamin Fereday (24 November 1873 – 1 January 1958) was an English first-class cricketer: a right-handed batsman and right-arm off-break bowler who played ten times for Worcestershire County Cricket Club between 1899 and 1901.

Born in Burnt Tree, Dudley, Worcestershire (now West Midlands), Fereday made his debut against Marylebone Cricket Club (MCC) at Lord's on 17 July 1899, opening the batting and making 25 and 23 in a crushing 332-run defeat. He also appeared in the county's home win against Leicestershire a week later; this match resulted in Worcestershire's first ever victory in the County Championship.

In 1900, Fereday made six appearances for the county, though he could muster only 77 runs in 11 innings with a best of just 18. He did, however, take his only two first-class wickets that summer: a caught and bowled dismissal of the little-known Yorkshire bowler Harry Riley and an lbw decision against Warwickshire stalwart Crowther Charlesworth. The following year he made his last two appearances at first-class level, his final match being a thrilling tie against the touring South Africans in which he made a career-best score of 37.

After retiring from county cricket, Fereday played in the Minor Counties Championship for Staffordshire for several years. He died at the age of 84 at Holy Cross, Worcestershire.
