= Geoffrey Darks =

English cricketer (1926–2004)

Cricket information
- Batting: Right-handed
- Bowling: Right-arm medium

Career statistics
Competition	First-class
Matches	7
Runs scored	89
Batting average	17.80
100s/50s	0/0
Top score	39
Balls bowled	816
Wickets	13
Bowling average	34.76
5 wickets in innings	1
10 wickets in match	0
Best bowling	5/49
Catches/stumpings	6/–
- Source: CricInfo, 14 April 2023

Geoffrey Chalton Darks (28 June 1926 – August 2004) was an English first-class cricketer who played seven times for Worcestershire after the Second World War. Only the first two of these games were in the County Championship; the others were against Cambridge University and Combined Services.

Darks' first wicket (his only one in 1946) was Leicestershire stalwart Jack Walsh. His best bowling by some distance was the 5–49 he claimed against Combined Services in May 1950; in no other first-class innings did he snare more than two victims. Not usually a productive batsman, with six single-figure scores in his eight innings (albeit three of those not out), he did however make 39 against Cambridge in the same match in late June 1950 in which he took his final wicket, that of David Sheppard.

Later in life, Darks became an umpire, although he never stood in a first-class game. His most important match in this regard was the Youth Test between England and West Indies at Stone in 1974, but he also umpired many of Warwickshire and Worcestershire's home Second XI games.

Darks was born in Bewdley, Worcestershire; he died at the age of 78 in Kidderminster in the same county.
