= Tom Hicks (cricketer) =

English cricketer (born 1979)

Personal information
- Full name: Thomas Charles Hicks
- Born: 28 August 1979 (age 47); Farnborough, Bromley, Greater London
- Batting: Right-handed
- Bowling: Right-arm off-break

Career statistics
Competition	First-class	List A
Matches	19	1
Runs scored	359	0
Batting average	15.60	0.00
100s/50s	0/2	0/0
Top score	58	0
Balls bowled	3,336	60
Wickets	41	0
Bowling average	47.80	–
5 wickets in innings	2	–
10 wickets in match	0	–
Best bowling	5/54	–
Catches/stumpings	18/–	0/–
- Source: Cricinfo, 8 November 2022

Thomas Charles Hicks (born 28 August 1979) is an English cricketer. Hicks studied at St Catherine's College, Oxford and all of his first-class appearances as of the end of 2006 had come for Oxford University teams (Oxford University, Oxford Universities and Oxford UCCE), apart from one game for British Universities in 1999.

His two half-centuries have both come for Oxford against Cambridge University: the higher of these being the 58 he scored in 2001, adding 109 for the ninth wicket with opener Matthew Floyd to help set up a three-wicket victory. He also took 5–77 in the second innings of this game, second only to the 5–54 he claimed in Oxford's win over Northamptonshire in June 2000.

Hicks has played minor counties cricket for Dorset since 1998, and it was for them that he made his only List A appearance, against Glamorgan in the 2000 NatWest Trophy.
