= Richard Devereux (cricketer) =

English cricketer

Personal information
- Full name: Richard Jaynes Devereux
- Born: 26 December 1938 (age 87); Castle Bromwich, Warwickshire, England
- Batting: Right-handed
- Bowling: Left-arm medium

Domestic team information
- Years: Team
- 1963: Worcestershire

Career statistics
Competition	FC	LA
Matches	11	1
Runs scored	216	30
Batting average	16.61	30.00
100s/50s	0/1	0/0
Top score	55*	30
Balls bowled	1,188	36
Wickets	13	0
Bowling average	44.69	-
5 wickets in innings	1	0
10 wickets in match	0	N/A
Best bowling	3/44	-
Catches/stumpings	13/0	0/0
- Source: CricketArchive, 17 November 2008

Richard Jaynes Devereux (born 26 December 1938) is a former English cricketer who played first-class and List A cricket for Worcestershire in 1963.

Devereux had played for the Worcestershire Second XI since 1959, but his first-class debut had to wait until May 1963, when he was selected to face Middlesex at Lord's. He top-scored with 22 not out from number eight in Worcestershire's painful first-innings progress to 79 all out in 55.4 overs, then took 0/49 with the ball; the game was drawn.

He stayed in the side until the middle of June, playing along the way in his only List A game, a Gillette Cup quarter-final in which he made an important 30 from number nine, and making his only first-class half-century, 55* against Cambridge University; he also took his best innings figures of 3/44 in that game. but then a paucity of wickets forced him back to the seconds. There, he still found it hard at first to take wickets, though he did score a couple of fifties.

However, in July Devereux took ten wickets in the match against Kent II, and seven more wickets in the next match, against Essex II, propelled him back into the first team before the month was out. Not for long, however: once more he struggled to take wickets, and after he had taken none at all in three successive games against Essex, Nottinghamshire and Warwickshire he was back in the Second XI. This time there would be no return, and Devereux never again played senior cricket.
