= Leslie Gale =

English cricketer (1904–1982)

Cricket information
- Batting: Right-handed
- Bowling: Right-arm slow

Career statistics
Competition	First-class
Matches	14
Runs scored	155
Batting average	7.75
100s/50s	0/0
Top score	19
Balls bowled	690
Wickets	10
Bowling average	39.40
5 wickets in innings	1
10 wickets in match	0
Best bowling	5/49
Catches/stumpings	5/–
- Source: CricInfo, 8 November 2022

Leslie Edward Gale (11 November 1904 – 22 January 1982) was an English first-class cricketer. He was a slow bowler who played fourteen matches for Worcestershire in the 1920s, 11 in 1923 and 1924, then a gap before another three in 1928.

Gale's most successful match was his first-class debut in early May 1923, when he claimed 5–49 in the first innings against Warwickshire. He never again took more than two wickets in a first-class innings; indeed, this single innings performance garnered him as many wickets as the entire remainder of his Worcestershire career.

After the end of his first-class career, Gale played minor counties cricket for Staffordshire in the 1930s, primarily as a top-order batsman.

Gale was born in Solihull; he died in Dudley at the age of 77.
