= Douglas Summers =

English cricketer

Personal information
- Full name: Douglas Walter Levi Summers
- Born: 12 October 1911. Smethwick, Sandwell, Staffordshire, England
- Died: 1 January 2000 (aged 88); Worcester, Worcestershire, England
- Batting: Right-handed
- Bowling: Slow left-arm orthodox

Domestic team information
- Years: Team
- 1930: Worcestershire
- Source: CricInfo, 30 December 2021

Douglas Walter Levi Summers (12 October 1911 – 1 January 2000) was an English first-class cricketer. He was a right-handed batsman and slow left arm bowler who played in a single match for Worcestershire against Warwickshire in 1930.

Summers was born in Smethwick, then Staffordshire now West Midlands; he died in Worcester on New Year's Day 2000 at the age of 88.

His father Francis had a longer Worcestershire career, making 57 appearances in the 1920s.
