= Henry Sale =

English cricketer

Cricket information
- Batting: Right-handed

Career statistics
Competition	First-class
Matches	4
Runs scored	74
Batting average	14.80
100s/50s	0/0
Top score	28*
Catches/stumpings	1/–
- Source: Cricinfo, 8 November 2022

Henry George Sale (26 March 1889 – 30 August 1975) was an English first-class cricketer who played four matches for Worcestershire in the 1920s.

His highest score of 28 not out was achieved in the first innings of his final match, against Northamptonshire, and from number 11 in the order. However, his part in a last-wicket stand of 57 was unable to stave off an innings defeat.

Sale was born in Shipston-on-Stour, Warwickshire; he died in the same town at the age of 86.
