= Philip Thorp =

English cricketer

Cricket information
- Batting: Right-handed

Career statistics
Competition	First-class
Matches	2
Runs scored	19
Batting average	4.75
100s/50s	0/0
Top score	11
Catches/stumpings	0/–
- Source: Cricinfo, 7 November 2022

Philip Thorp (6 May 1911 – December 2006) was an English first-class cricketer who played in two matches for Worcestershire in 1935. He was born in Kidderminster, Worcestershire.

On his debut against Surrey, he was unfortunate to come up against an irresistible first-innings spell of bowling from Alf Gover, who finished with 8-34 (his career best) as Worcestershire were skittled for 73. Thorp made 11 of those, being one of four Worcestershire batsman to reach double figures (no-one reached 20). In the second innings he scored only 8 (again being dismissed by Gover). He played one more match, against Lancashire, but made a pair.
