= Ravinder Senghera =

Indian-born English cricketer

Personal information
- Born: 25 January 1947 (age 79); Delhi, India
- Batting: Right-handed
- Bowling: Right-arm off-break

Career statistics
| Competition | First-class | List A |
|---|---|---|
| Matches | 24 | 9 |
| Runs scored | 281 | 40 |
| Batting average | 15.61 | 10.00 |
| 100s/50s | 0/0 | 0/0 |
| Top score | 36* | 12 |
| Balls bowled | 4,601 | 218 |
| Wickets | 58 | 2 |
| Bowling average | 39.70 | 91.50 |
| 5 wickets in innings | 1 | 0 |
| 10 wickets in match | 0 | 0 |
| Best bowling | 5/81 | 1/37 |
| Catches/stumpings | 7/– | 2/– |
- Source: Cricinfo, 30 December 2021

Ravinder Senghera (born 25 January 1947) is an Indian-born former English first-class cricketer who played a number of times for Worcestershire in the mid-1970s. He also played one game for D. H. Robins' XI in 1974.

After a number of games for Worcestershire's second team, Senghara broke into the first eleven in May 1974 against Cambridge University. Worcestershire declared their first innings at 388/1 (Turner 202*) and eventually won by an innings, so Senghera did not get to bat, but he claimed five wickets in the match, his maiden scalp being that of Peter Hayes. A couple of weeks later he played against Oxford University and did even better, taking 8–108 in the match; his first-innings 5-81 remained his only five-wicket haul. He made no further county appearances that year, but did turn out (albeit rather ineffectually) for DH Robins' XI against the Pakistanis at Eastbourne.

In 1975, Senghera again played only a handful of games, and ten first-class wickets at 57.40 was a less than satisfactory return. There were a couple of minor bright spots only: he hit a fighting 36 not out as part of an unbroken last-wicket stand of 58 with Norman Gifford (30*) against Gloucestershire, and he also took the first of only two career one-day wickets when he dismissed Kent's John Shepherd in June. (His other one-day wicket was that of Clive Rice of Nottinghamshire in 1976, but the gap between them was only two days short of a year.)

1976 saw Senghera enjoy his only extended run in the Worcestershire team, making 16 first-class and eight List A appearances, but he did not make the most of this opportunity. Although more effective than in the previous season, he remained somewhat expensive with the ball, averaging 42.73 for his 34 first-class wickets, while in the one-day game he sent down 28.3 overs but took only the aforementioned wicket of Rice, for a total cost of 146 runs. As a batsman he fell away badly in scoring only 221 runs in 20 first-class innings and 40 in five List A games.

Senghara's last game was in early September 1976, when he picked up the single wicket of Zaheer Abbas in Worcestershire's nine-wicket defeat by Gloucestershire.
