= Alfred Tasker =

English cricketer (1934–2019)

Personal information
- Born: 16 June 1934; Southwark, Surrey, England
- Died: 18 August 2019 (aged 85); Bentleigh, Victoria, Australia
- Batting: Right-handed

Career statistics
Competition	First-class
Matches	1
Runs scored	–
Batting average	–
100s/50s	–
Top score	–
Catches/stumpings	1/0
- Source: CricInfo, 7 November 2022

Alfred George Ernest Tasker (16 June 1934 – 18 April 2019) was an English first-class cricketer who played in one match, keeping wicket for Worcestershire against Cambridge University in 1956. He took one catch, to dismiss future Test player Bob Barber, but Worcestershire declared in both their innings before he had a chance to bat; he never did get an opportunity. Tasker died in Bentleigh, Victoria, Australia on 18 April 2019, at the age of 84.
