= Ben Preece =

English cricketer

Personal information
- Full name: Benjamin Edward Ashley Preece
- Born: 8 November 1976 (age 50); Birmingham, England
- Batting: Right-handed
- Bowling: Right-arm fast-medium

Domestic team information
- Years: Team
- 1996: Worcestershire

Career statistics
| Competition | FC | LA |
|---|---|---|
| Matches | 3 | 1 |
| Runs scored | 5 | 1 |
| Batting average | 2.50 | N/A |
| 100s/50s | 0/0 | 0/0 |
| Top score | 3* | 1* |
| Balls bowled | 458 | 12 |
| Wickets | 8 | 1 |
| Bowling average | 48.50 | 10.00 |
| 5 wickets in innings | 0 | 0 |
| 10 wickets in match | 0 | n/a |
| Best bowling | 4/79 | 1/10 |
| Catches/stumpings | 1/– | 0/– |
- Source: , 6 September 2007

Benjamin Edward Ashley Preece (born 8 November 1976 in Birmingham) is a former English first-class cricketer. Due to injury, he had only a very brief career at the top level of the domestic game, appearing in three first-class and one List A games, all for Worcestershire in the 1996 season. He had previously played for a couple of years in the Worcestershire seconds, being the county's leading bowler at that level in 1995 and 1996.

Preece's best performance came against South Africa A in August, when he took six wickets, including a career-best 4–79 in the first innings. He was released by Worcestershire on the grounds of injury at the end of the 1996 season, and then appeared very briefly at Second XI level for Sussex and Surrey.

Ben is now Director of Cricket for Universities Women's Cricket Club and University of New South Wales in Sydney Premier Cricket Australia.
