= Martyn Saunders =

English cricketer (born 1958)

Cricket information
- Batting: Right-handed
- Bowling: Right arm fast-medium

Career statistics
Competition	First-class
Matches	3
Runs scored	12
Batting average	6.00
100s/50s	0/0
Top score	12
Balls bowled	306
Wickets	6
Bowling average	35.33
5 wickets in innings	0
10 wickets in match	0
Best bowling	3/57
Catches/stumpings	0/–
- Source: Cricinfo, 8 November 2022

Martyn Saunders (born 16 May 1958) was an English first-class cricketer who played three first-class games for Worcestershire in 1980. He was born in Worcester.

Saunders played for Worcestershire's Second XI as early as 1976, but had to wait four years before making his first-team debut, against Lancashire in the only first-class match ever played at Stourport-on-Severn. Worcestershire recorded a crushing innings victory, but Saunders' only contribution of note was to remove opposing captain Frank Hayes as Lancashire followed on.

After a further spell in the second team, Saunders was selected for the last two County Championship matches of the 1980 season. Against Kent he claimed five wickets, three of them Test players: Chris Cowdrey (twice), Mark Benson and Alan Knott. However, Cowdrey's wicket in the second innings was to be Saunders' last: against Nottinghamshire he went wicketless; he never played again.
