= Ronald Jones (cricketer) =

English cricketer (1938–2019)

Personal information
- Born: 9 September 1938; Tettenhall, Wolverhampton, England
- Died: 30 April 2019 (aged 80); Dudley, Staffordshire, England
- Batting: Right-handed

Domestic team information
- Years: Team
- 1955: Worcestershire

Career statistics
Competition	FC
Matches	1
Runs scored	25
Batting average	12.50
100s/50s	0/0
Top score	23
Balls bowled	0
Wickets	0
Bowling average	-
5 wickets in innings	0
10 wickets in match	0
Best bowling	-
Catches/stumpings	0/0
- Source: CricketArchive, 30 November 2008

Ronald Jones (9 September 1938 – 30 April 2019) was an English cricketer who played a single game of first-class cricket, for Worcestershire against Cambridge University in 1955, in which he scored 2 and 23.
