= Eric Brownell =

Australian-born English cricketer

Cricket information
- Batting: Right-handed

Career statistics
| Competition | First-class |
|---|---|
| Matches | 1 |
| Runs scored | 28 |
| Batting average | 14.00 |
| 100s/50s | 0/0 |
| Top score | 21 |
| Catches/stumpings | 1/– |
- Source: Cricinfo, 23 April 2023

Eric Lindsay Douglas Brownell (7 November 1876 – 22 October 1945) was an Australian-born English cricketer, who played one first-class match, for Worcestershire against Oxford University in 1908. He scored 21 and 7 and took one catch in the second innings, to dismiss Oxford opener Chris Hurst.

Brownell was born in Hobart, Tasmania; he died aged 68 in Windsor, New South Wales.
