= Raymond Morris (cricketer) =

English cricketer

Personal information
- Born: 20 June 1929; Hartlebury, Worcestershire, England
- Died: 16 April 2017 (aged 87)
- Batting: Right-handed
- Role: wicket-keeper

Domestic team information
- Years: Team
- 1958: Worcestershire

Career statistics
Competition	FC
Matches	2
Runs scored	7
Batting average	2.33
100s/50s	0/0
Top score	7
Balls bowled	0
Wickets	0
Bowling average	-
5 wickets in innings	0
10 wickets in match	0
Best bowling	-
Catches/stumpings	8/0
- Source: CricketArchive, 3 October 2008

Raymond Morris (20 June 1929 – 16 April 2017) was a first-class cricketer who played two matches as a wicket-keeper for Worcestershire in 1958.

Seven of his eight catches came on debut against Derbyshire at Kidderminster. In the same match, he was the second wicket in a hat-trick by the Derbyshire fast bowler Les Jackson in which all three wickets were catches by wicketkeeper George Dawkes.
