= Percival Corbett =

English cricketer

Cricket information
- Batting: Right-handed

Career statistics
Competition	First-class
Matches	7
Runs scored	57
Batting average	5.70
100s/50s	0/0
Top score	20
Balls bowled	102
Wickets	0
Bowling average	–
5 wickets in innings	–
10 wickets in match	–
Best bowling	–
Catches/stumpings	2/–
- Source: CricInfo, 24 April 2020

Percival Thomas Corbett (20 February 1900 – 26 June 1944) was an English cricketer who played seven first-class cricket matches for Worcestershire County Cricket Club in the early 1920s, but found little success with the county. He later played club cricket in Liverpool.

Corbett was born in Fernhill Heath, Worcestershire. He died at the age of 44 in West Malvern, also in Worcestershire.
