= Cedric Humphries =

English cricketer

Personal information
- Full name: Cedric Alfred Humphries
- Born: 26 December 1913; Kidderminster, Worcestershire, England
- Died: 18 November 1944 (aged 30); Gilrath, Netherlands
- Batting: Right-handed
- Bowling: Right-arm medium

Domestic team information
- Years: Team
- 1934–1935: Worcestershire
- FC debut: 9 June 1934 Worcestershire v Lancashire
- Last FC: 23 July 1935 Worcestershire v Northamptonshire

Career statistics
Competition	First-class
Matches	13
Runs scored	328
Batting average	15.61
100s/50s	0/0
Top score	44
Balls bowled	0
Wickets	–
Bowling average	–
5 wickets in innings	–
10 wickets in match	–
Best bowling	–
Catches/stumpings	3/–
- Source: CricketArchive, 17 September 2007

Cedric Alfred Humphries (26 December 1913 – 18 November 1944) was an English first-class cricketer who played 13 matches, all for Worcestershire in 1934 and 1935.

Humphries made an unbeaten 41 in his first innings on debut, though Lancashire won the game in two days by a huge margin, at Worcester. He made 44 — his career best — in his second match, against Cambridge University, and 43* versus Nottinghamshire at Worksop in July, but these were the only innings of his career in which he reached 40.

Two of his brothers, Gerald and Norman, also played briefly for Worcestershire.
