= Peter Stimpson =

Welsh cricketer

Personal information
- Full name: Peter John Stimpson
- Born: 25 May 1947 (age 79); Aberfan, Glamorgan, Wales
- Batting: Right-handed
- Bowling: Right-arm medium

Domestic team information
- Years: Team
- 1971–1972: Worcestershire

Career statistics
Competition	First-class	List A
Matches	30	24
Runs scored	1,327	236
Batting average	26.01	11.23
100s/50s	1/9	0/1
Top score	103	52
Balls bowled	30	–
Wickets	0	–
Bowling average	–	–
5 wickets in innings	–	–
10 wickets in match	–	–
Best bowling	–	–
Catches/stumpings	8/–	3/–
- Source: CricketArchive, 19 October 2008

Peter John Stimpson (born 25 May 1947) is a former Welsh first-class cricketer who played first-class and List A cricket for Worcestershire in 1971 and 1972.

Stimpson was playing for Worcestershire's Second XI as early as 1963, aged just 16, but it was almost eight years before he made his first-team debut, playing against Oxford University at The University Parks in May 1971. He opened the batting, but in his only innings managed just 11. However, he had several good innings later in the season, including the only first-class century of his career: 103 against Glamorgan at Worcester. He immediately followed this up with knocks of 88 and 42 not out against Warwickshire at Edgbaston.

Stimpson had ended 1971 with 787 first-class runs at 27.13, but he suffered a run drought in early 1972, repeatedly being dismissed for very low scores. He did make 52 against Surrey in mid-May, but it was not enough to prevent his return to the Second XI, and it was July before he re-established himself in the first team. Again he had a run of failures, but 88 in the County Championship against Kent brought him out of it, and 52 against Essex in the John Player League (his only List A half-century) gave cause for further hope. However, despite one more half-century (66 versus Nottinghamshire) by the end of the year he was struggling for runs once more, and 1972 was to be his second and last season of first-team county cricket.

Although Stimpson's career in senior cricket had ended, in the mid-1970s he appeared on several occasions for Zambia in East African tournaments, and in August 1976 produced an eye-catching performance, hitting 89 and 128* as an opener as Zambia beat Tanzania.
