= William Wilkes =

English cricketer

William Harry Walters Wilkes (1865 - 18 February 1940) was an English first-class cricketer. He was a right-handed batsman who played 14 times for Worcestershire in their early years as a first-class team.

Born in Aston, Birmingham, Wilkes' first-class debut came in a County Championship match against Yorkshire County Cricket Club in 1899, Worcestershire's first season at that level; he made 55 in his only innings. The following summer he made ten appearances, while in 1901 he hit his only century, 109 against Yorkshire at Dewsbury. His last match was against Sussex in 1902.

Wilkes died in Birmingham at the age of 75.
