= John Winnington =

English cricketer

John Winnington DSO
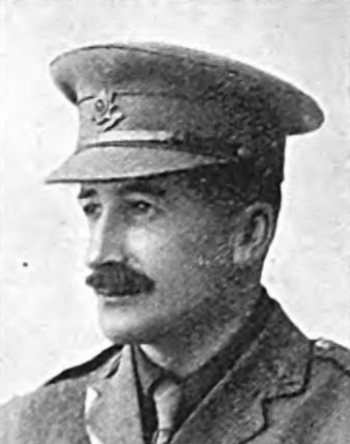

Cricket information
- Batting: Right-handed

Career statistics
Competition	First-class
Matches	1
Runs scored	20
Batting average	10.00
100s/50s	0/0
Top score	10
Catches/stumpings	0/–
- Source: CricketArchive, 8 November 2022

John Francis Sartorius Winnington DSO (17 September 1876 – 22 September 1918) was an English first-class cricketer who played in one match for Worcestershire against Oxford University at The University Parks in 1908. He scored 0 and 20 in Worcestershire's crushing 332-run victory. He was born in Charlton Kings, Cheltenham, Gloucestershire.

Winnington was commissioned into a Militia battalion of the Worcestershire Regiment in 1895. He later transferred to the Regular Army and was promoted captain in 1901. In the First World War, Winnington was promoted lieutenant-colonel in 1915. As well as being awarded the DSO, he was mentioned in dispatches four times. He died of wounds near Kefar Kassin, Ramle, Palestine at the age of 42 while commanding a battalion of the Northamptonshire Regiment.
