= Benjamin Tipper =

English cricketer

Personal information
- Full name: Benjamin Claude Cecil Tipper
- Born: 7 July 1896; Kings Norton, Worcestershire , England
- Died: 11 July 1970 (aged 74); Norton Lindsey, Warwickshire, England
- Batting: Right-handed

Career statistics
| Competition | FC |
|---|---|
| Matches | 5 |
| Runs scored | 137 |
| Batting average | 15.22 |
| 100s/50s | 0/0 |
| Top score | 43 |
| Balls bowled | 140 |
| Wickets | 4 |
| Bowling average | 20.00 |
| 5 wickets in innings | 0 |
| 10 wickets in match | 0 |
| Best bowling | 2/0 |
| Catches/stumpings | 7/0 |
- Source: CricketArchive, 20 May 2009

Benjamin Claude Cecil Tipper (7 July 1896 – 11 July 1970) was an English cricketer who played five first-class matches for Worcestershire in 1919. All were friendlies, as Worcestershire did not re-enter the County Championship until the following year.

== Career ==
Tipper made his debut on 23 June against Gloucestershire, and his 42 in the first innings helped avert a crisis; he had come in with the score on 27/5, but his steadying knock helped the team to 201. He also took 2/49 in Gloucestershire's own first innings (his first victim being Alfred Dipper), but second time around he was out for 3 and he took no more wickets before the game finished in a draw.

Tipper had no notable success in his next three games, although in mid-August (once more against Gloucestershire) he took the final two wickets in the first innings to record his best bowling analysis of 1.2-1-0-2. He played only one more first-class match, against Warwickshire a week later. Here he made 43, his career best, and 0; his five overs of bowling were unsuccessful.
