= James Naden =

English cricketer

Personal information
- Born: 13 July 1889
- Died: 14 June 1963 (aged 73)
- Batting: Right-handed
- Bowling: Right-arm fast-medium

Career statistics
Competition	First-class
Matches	2
Runs scored	23
Batting average	23.00
100s/50s	0/0
Top score	16*
Balls bowled	204
Wickets	2
Bowling average	68.00
5 wickets in innings	0
10 wickets in match	0
Best bowling	2/111
Catches/stumpings	2/–
- Source: Cricinfo, 7 November 2022

James Rupert Naden (13 July 1889 – 14 June 1963) was an English first-class cricketer. He was a right-handed batsman and right arm fast bowler who played two first-class games for Worcestershire in midsummer 1922.

He took his only two wickets (those of George Collins and Bill Ashdown) on debut against Kent, but that was in a Kent innings of 509/6 declared, and Worcestershire were demolished by an innings and 234 runs. In his other first-class game, against Gloucestershire two weeks later, he did not take a wicket.

Naden was born in Tipton (which was then in Staffordshire); he died at the age of 73 in Turls Hill, Sedgley (also at the time in Staffordshire).
