= Francis Romney =

English cricketer

Cricket information
- Batting: Right-handed

Career statistics
| Competition | First-class |
|---|---|
| Matches | 4 |
| Runs scored | 39 |
| Batting average | 9.75 |
| 100s/50s | 0/0 |
| Top score | 20* |
| Catches/stumpings | 0/0 |
- Source: Cricinfo, 7 November 2022

Francis William Romney (25 November 1873 – 28 January 1963) was an English first-class cricketer, who played four matches, all for Worcestershire in 1900; he also played for the county in Minor Counties cricket before it was raised to first-class status.

Born in Tewkesbury, Gloucestershire, Romney's first-class debut came against Leicestershire: he made 4 and 10 not out. In his next game against Oxford University he hit what proved to be his highest score, 20 not out (the second top score in the innings) as Worcestershire were dismissed for 121 (they went on to lose by three wickets). Poor displays against Gloucestershire and Marylebone Cricket Club (MCC) followed, and that was that as far as his first-class career was concerned.

Romney died in Malvern, Worcestershire, at the age of 89.
