= Thomas Allchurch =

English cricketer (1883–1914)

Personal information
- Born: 24 April 1883; Old Swinford, Stourbridge, then Worcestershire, England
- Died: 23 October 1934 (aged 51); Halesowen, then Worcestershire, England
- Batting: Right-handed
- Bowling: Right-arm off-break

Career statistics
Competition	FC
Matches	3
Runs scored	74
Batting average	12.33
100s/50s	0/1
Top score	51
Balls bowled	389
Wickets	10
Bowling average	28.00
5 wickets in innings	1
10 wickets in match	0
Best bowling	5/70
Catches/stumpings	2/0
- Source: CricketArchive, 2 May 2009

Thomas Allchurch (24 April 1883 – 23 October 1934) was an English cricketer who played three first-class games for Worcestershire in 1919 and 1920.

He made his first-class debut in late June 1919 against Gloucestershire at New Road, and performed well, scoring 51 (his only fifty) and taking 4/76 in the first innings. The following month, also at New Road, he had an unsuccessful time (5 and 7; 23-2-114-1) in a crushing innings-and-203-run defeat against the Australian Imperial Forces. Finally, in August 1920 he played against Lancashire at Stourbridge. Although Worcestershire again lost by an innings, Allchurch's 5/70 was the best bowling return of his short career.
