= Charles Corden =

English cricketer

Cricket information
- Batting: Right-handed

Domestic team information
- Years: Team
- 1900–1903: Worcestershire

Career statistics
Competition	First-class
Matches	17
Runs scored	479
Batting average	16.51
100s/50s	0/2
Top score	64
Catches/stumpings	6/–
- Source: Cricinfo, 13 April 2023

Charles Frederic Corden (30 December 1874 – 26 February 1924) was an English first-class cricketer, who played 17 times for Worcestershire between 1900 and 1903.

Born in Croydon, Surrey, Corden appeared several times for Surrey's Second XI in the mid-1890s, but his first-class debut came in May 1900 when he was chosen for Worcestershire's match against London County. He scored 24 and 0, but the game was more notable for George Alfred Wilson's 7-71 (including a hat-trick) in the first innings. Corden's next match was not until May 1901, but in that he made 51 not out against Cambridge University. The county were nevertheless defeated by seven wickets.

Again he had to wait until the next season for another chance, but in 1902 he played 13 times, and in May hit a career-best 64 against Sussex. However, he only once passed 30 in his subsequent 17 innings that year, and a season's tally of 340 runs at 15.45 was disappointing, and after two more games in 1903, Corden was seen no more; he had failed to reach double figures in his final nine innings.

Corden died in the town of his birth at the age of 49.
