= Trevor Larkham =

English cricketer

Cricket information
- Batting: Right-handed
- Bowling: Leg-break

Career statistics
Competition	First-class
Matches	1
Runs scored	13
Batting average	6.50
100s/50s	0/0
Top score	13
Balls bowled	108
Wickets	1
Bowling average	64.00
5 wickets in innings	0
10 wickets in match	0
Best bowling	1/64
Catches/stumpings	0/–
- Source: Cricinfo, 7 November 2022

William Trevor Larkham (10 November 1929 – 3 April 2004) was an English first-class cricketer who played a single first-class match for Worcestershire against Yorkshire in 1952, as a replacement for Roly Jenkins. In an innings defeat, he took just one wicket, that of Willie Watson, and made 0 and 13 with the bat.

Larkham played much club cricket for Kidderminster Cricket Club. He was born and died in Kidderminster, Worcestershire.
