= Philip Dorrell =

English cricketer (1914–1994)

Personal information
- Born: 6 December 1914; Worcester, England
- Died: 8 November 1994 (aged 79); Worcester, England
- Batting: Right-handed
- Bowling: Right-arm medium

Career statistics
Competition	First-class
Matches	1
Runs scored	1
Batting average	1.00
100s/50s	0/0
Top score	1
Catches/stumpings	0/–
- Source: CricInfo, 7 November 2022

Philip George Dorrell (6 December 1914 — 8 November 1994) was an English cricketer who played a single first-class match, for Worcestershire against Northamptonshire in 1946. He scored 1 in his only inning.

Dorrell was born in Worcester. He also died there, aged 79.
