= Victor Humpherson =

English cricketer

Cricket information
- Batting: Right-handed
- Bowling: Right-arm medium

Career statistics
| Competition | First-class |
|---|---|
| Matches | 13 |
| Runs scored | 154 |
| Batting average | 7.70 |
| 100s/50s | 0/0 |
| Top score | 16 |
| Balls bowled | 985 |
| Wickets | 16 |
| Bowling average | 31.25 |
| 5 wickets in innings | 1 |
| 10 wickets in match | 0 |
| Best bowling | 5/50 |
| Catches/stumpings | 10/– |
- Source: Cricinfo, 8 November 2022

Victor William Humpherson (15 July 1896 – 19 October 1978) was an English first-class cricketer who played 13 games for Worcestershire in the early 1920s.

Humpherson's debut came against Hampshire in late May 1921. He scored 16 and 12 (the 16 would remain his highest score) and went wicketless from five overs. In the following match, against Northamptonshire, he did claim his first wickets, taking three, all in the first innings; his maiden victim was William Wells. He played five more games that season, his greatest success coming in early August against Gloucestershire at Clifton College where he took a career-best 5–50 in the first innings.

Humpherson played three games in 1922 and four in 1923, but took only three wickets in all. His final victim was Yorkshire's Percy Holmes in May 1923, after which he had no success in the three remaining matches of his first-class career. Indeed, he did not bowl at all on his final two appearances, and he bowed out quietly with 8 and 7 against the West Indians at Worcester at the end of August.

Humpherson was born in Bewdley, Worcestershire; he died at the age of 82 in Rowfant, Sussex.
