= Edward Righton Jr =

English cricketer

Edward Righton
Cricket information
- Batting: Right-handed

Career statistics
Competition	First-class
Matches	4
Runs scored	27
Batting average	3.85
100s/50s	0/0
Top score	19
Catches/stumpings	1/0
- Source: Cricinfo, 7 November 2022

Edward Grantham Righton (24 September 1912 – 2 May 1986) was an English first-class cricketer who played four matches for Worcestershire, two in 1934 and two in 1936. He batted at six in the 1934 matches, and opened in the 1936 games, but was not a success in either role: his innings were 6, 0, 0, 19, 1, 0 and 1; the 19 came against Derbyshire in June 1936.

Righton was born in Evesham, Worcestershire, and died in the same town at the age of 73.

His father Edward (also, in fact, named Edward Grantham Righton) also played four times for Worcestershire, between 1911 and 1913.
