= Albert Shutt =

English cricketer (born 1952)

Personal information
- Born: 21 September 1952 (age 74); Stockton-on-Tees, County Durham
- Batting: Right-handed
- Bowling: Right-arm medium-fast

Domestic team information
- Years: Team
- 1972–1973: Worcestershire
- 1977: Durham

Career statistics
Competition	First-class	List A
Matches	2	4
Runs scored	–	0
Batting average	–	0.00
100s/50s	–	0/0
Top score	–	0*
Balls bowled	300	212
Wickets	2	2
Bowling average	90.50	72.00
5 wickets in innings	0	0
10 wickets in match	0	0
Best bowling	1/36	2/25
Catches/stumpings	1/–	1/–
- Source: Cricinfo, 18 November 2017

Albert Shutt (born 21 September 1952) is an English former first-class cricketer who played a handful of times for Worcestershire in the early 1970s. He was born in Stockton-on-Tees, County Durham.

He had a short run in the first team in 1972 after taking 5/41 and 3/29 against Glamorgan seconds, and played a single one-day match the following season, taking four wickets in first-class and List A games combined. His wickets taken were those of Malcolm Nash and Basher Hassan in the County Championship, and Gordon Greenidge and Roger Prideaux in the John Player League. As a batsman, Shutt played 24 innings at first- and second-team level, scoring a total of 35 runs with a highest score of 8.

Shutt played one Minor Counties Championship match for his native Durham, against Cheshire in 1977. He took 1/55 and 0/39, and didn't bat in either innings. In 1995, he joined Richmondshire Cricket Club in the North Yorkshire and South Durham League.
