= Arnold Nesbitt (cricketer) =

English cricketer

Cricket information
- Batting: Right-handed
- Role: Wicketkeeper

Career statistics
Competition	First-class
Matches	1
Runs scored	5
Batting average	5.00
100s/50s	0/0
Top score	3
Catches/stumpings	1/0
- Source: Cricinfo, 8 November 2022

Arnold Stearns Nesbitt (16 October 1878 – 7 November 1914) was an English first-class cricketer. A wicket-keeper, he played one match for Worcestershire against Middlesex at Lord's in May 1914. His contribution to the game, which Worcestershire lost by an innings, was small: he made only one dismissal (catching Jack Hearne off the bowling of Robert Burrows), and scored 2 not out and 3 with the bat.

Nesbitt was born in Walton-on-Thames, Surrey. He was commissioned a Second lieutenant in the 3rd (Militia) Battalion of the Royal Irish Regiment on 24 January 1900. He was killed in action at Ploegsteert Wood, Belgium, in the First World War, while serving as a captain in the Army.
