= Edward Righton Sr =

English cricketer

Edward Righton senior
Personal information
- Full name: Edward Grantham Righton
- Born: 23 November 1884; Evesham, Worcestershire, England
- Died: 3 January 1964 (aged 79); Evesham, Worcestershire, England
- Batting: Right-handed
- Bowling: Right-arm medium

Domestic team information
- Years: Team
- 1911–1913: Worcestershire

Career statistics
Competition	First-class
Matches	4
Runs scored	60
Batting average	15.00
100s/50s	0/0
Top score	48
Balls bowled	12
Wickets	1
Bowling average	21.00
5 wickets in innings	0
10 wickets in match	0
Best bowling	1/21
Catches/stumpings	1/–
- Source: CricketArchive, 9 September 2007

Edward Grantham Righton (23 November 1884 – 3 January 1964) was an English first-class cricketer who played four matches for Worcestershire between 1911 and 1913.

Although he had appeared for Worcestershire's Second XI in the Minor Counties Championship as early as 1907, Righton made his first-class debut in July 1911, playing against Leicestershire at Worcester. It proved to be by far the most successful of his four games at this level: Righton hit a first-innings 48 and took his only first-class wicket, that of England Test cricketer Albert Knight. He did nothing in his three subsequent games, other than to hold a catch to dismiss Thomas Langdon in his final match, against Gloucestershire in June 1913.

His son Edward (also, in fact, named Edward Grantham Righton) also played four times for Worcestershire, in the mid-1930s.
