= Percy Evans (cricketer) =

British Indian English cricketer

Personal information
- Full name: Percy Stanbrook Evans
- Born: 20 July 1894; Kirkee, British India
- Died: 17 January 1959 (aged 64); Bromley-by-Bow, London, England
- Bowling: Slow left arm orthodox

Domestic team information
- Years: Team
- 1928: Worcestershire

Career statistics
Competition	FC
Matches	5
Runs scored	15
Batting average	2.50
100s/50s	0/0
Top score	5
Balls bowled	360
Wickets	3
Bowling average	66.33
5 wickets in innings	0
10 wickets in match	0
Best bowling	3-84
Catches/stumpings	3/0
- Source: , 3 August 2008

Percy Stanbrook Evans (20 July 1894 – 17 January 1959) was a British first-class cricketer who played five matches for Worcestershire in 1928.

Evans made a significant contribution, when on debut against Glamorgan he took 3-84, dismissing Dai Davies, Frank Ryan and Dennis Sullivan.
