= Francis Summers =

English cricketer

Francis Theodore Summers (25 January 1887 – 27 October 1967) was an English first-class cricketer. He was a right-handed tail-end batsman and wicket-keeper who played 57 times for Worcestershire in the 1920s, making over 80 dismissals.

He was born in Alcester, Warwickshire, and died at the age of 80 in Inkberrow, Worcestershire.

His son Douglas played one match for Worcestershire in 1930.
