= Brintons =

British carpet manufacturer

Brintons logo

Brintons is a British manufacturer of carpets, founded in 1783 by William Brinton at Hill Pool in Chaddesley, Kidderminster, to manufacture spun yarns.

Its first factory in Kidderminster was established in 1820 and, as of 2008, the company still had a major manufacturing presence on the Stourport edge of the town. In 1970, Brintons opened its first factory in Telford, Shropshire, to make spun yarns. It owns and operates other factories all over the world, including in Poland, Portugal, and India, manufacturing bespoke and stock woven Axminster and Wilton wool-rich carpets and rugs.

In 1993, Brintons launched an advertising campaign featuring costumes made from the company's carpets and designed by Vivienne Westwood. A second Westwood-designed campaign followed in 1995, based on dress styles from 1783, the year the company was founded. The photography for both campaigns was by David Bailey. A third campaign was launched in 1996, and in 2000, British designer Antony Price created evening gowns constructed from carpet, photographed by Patrick Lichfield (Lord Lichfield) for these advertisements.

As one of the first companies to be awarded the Royal Warrant at the beginning of Queen Elizabeth II's reign in 1958, Brintons has continued to supply carpets and designs for a range of projects for the Queen, Buckingham Palace, and other royal households.

The firm faced financial difficulties in 2011, its 228th year, and was acquired by The Carlyle Group in September of that year.

In August 2015, Brintons acquired Fabryka Dywanów Agnella in Białystok, a Polish manufacturer and supplier of carpets and rugs.

Brintons has one of the world's largest commercial design archives and historical pattern libraries in the industry, dating back to the late 18th century. It contains thousands of original hand-painted design papers, ranging from Baroque and Art Deco to up-to-the-minute contemporary designs.

Brintons was acquired from the Carlyle Group by Argand Partners in 2017 for an undisclosed sum.
