= Patrick Leeson =

English cricketer

Patrick George Leeson (17 July 1915 – 12 May 1997) was an English first-class cricketer: a right-handed batsman who played a single first-class match for Worcestershire against Northamptonshire in July 1936. Oddly, in that game he was dismissed in both innings by a Test bowler who was to take seven wickets in that innings: first for a duck by Vallance Jupp, and then for 7 by Austin Matthews. Leeson made one catch, to dismiss another Test player, Fred Bakewell.

Leeson bowled right arm off-breaks, but never sent down a delivery in first-class cricket.

He was born in Darjeeling, Bengal, India; he died in Leicester at the age of 81.
