= Frederick Burr =

English cricketer

Career statistics
Competition	First-class
Matches	1
Runs scored	46
Batting average	46.00
100s/50s	0/0
Top score	39
Catches/stumpings	1/–
- Source: Cricinfo, 6 December 2022

Frederick Bonham Burr (2 August 1887 – 12 March 1915) was an English cricketer who played a single first-class game for Worcestershire against Oxford University in 1911. He made 39 and 7 not outs and caught Ronald Lagden in the first innings.

Burr was born in Blacklands, Hastings, Sussex. During World War I he joined the Worcestershire Regiment and attained the rank of lieutenant. He died in Kemmel, Belgium, aged 27 (although his gravestone erroneously records 28).
