= William Adshead =

English cricketer

Cricket information
- Batting: Right-handed

Career statistics
Competition	First-class
Matches	12
Runs scored	244
Batting average	11.61
100s/50s	0/1
Top score	51
Catches/stumpings	14/0
- Source: CricInfo, 24 April 2020

William Ewart Adshead (10 April 1901 – 26 January 1951) was an English cricketer and footballer. He played 12 first-class matches for Worcestershire and two First Division matches for Aston Villa in the 1920s. He was later known as William Ewart Barnie-Adshead.

Adshead made his first-class debut for Worcestershire against Sussex at Worcester in August 1922, scoring 4 and 17. The following month the 21-year-old debuted as a centre-back for Villa in a 2–4 away defeat at Blackburn's Ewood Park. Two days later Adshead scored Villa's only goal 5 minutes into his final match at home to Cardiff City but was unable to prevent a defeat.

Adshead did not play cricket again until 1924, and in that and the following season appeared a total of 10 times, holding 13 catches. He scored his only half-century when he made 51 against Warwickshire at Edgbaston in May 1925; this was the only match in which he acted as wicket-keeper. He did not play at all in 1926 or 1927, but returned for one final game against Nottinghamshire in 1928, scoring 1 and 0 and taking one catch.

Adshead was born in Tividale, Dudley; he died at the age of 49 in Edgbaston, Birmingham.

His brother, Frank, played twice for Worcestershire in 1927.
