= William Hartill =

English cricketer

Cricket information
- Batting: Right-handed

Career statistics
Competition	First-class
Matches	1
Runs scored	2
Batting average	2.00
100s/50s	0/0
Top score	2
Catches/stumpings	0/–
- Source: Cricinfo, 8 November 2022

William Norman Hartill (13 December 1911 – 3 March 1971) was an English first-class cricketer who played a single first-class match, for Worcestershire against Somerset in July 1935. His influence on the game was minimal: he was run out for 2 in his only innings, did not bowl and did not hold a catch.

Hartill was born in Dudley, which was then in Worcestershire; he died in Martley, also Worcestershire, aged 59.
