= Michael Passey =

English cricketer (1937–2023)

Personal information
- Full name: Michael Francis William Passey
- Born: 6 June 1937; Crossway Green, Worcestershire, England
- Died: 25 January 2023 (aged 85); Kidderminster, Worcestershire, England
- Batting: Right-handed
- Bowling: Right arm off-break

Career statistics
Competition	First-class
Matches	1
Runs scored	1
Batting average	1.00
100s/50s	0/0
Top score	1
Balls bowled	72
Wickets	1
Bowling average	57.00
5 wickets in innings	0
10 wickets in match	0
Best bowling	1/57
Catches/stumpings	0/–
- Source: CricInfo, 7 November 2022

Michael Francis William Passey (6 June 1937 – 25 January 2023) was an English first-class cricketer who played a single match for Worcestershire against Glamorgan in 1953, aged only 16. He took one wicket, that of Phil Clift, but conceded 57 runs from his 12 overs. Batting at number 11, he was out for 1 in his only innings.
