= John Sutor =

English cricketer

Cricket information
- Batting: Right-handed
- Bowling: Right-arm medium

Career statistics
Competition	First-class
Matches	1
Runs scored	3
Batting average	1.50
100s/50s	0/0
Top score	2
Catches/stumpings	0/–
- Source: Cricinfo, 7 November 2022

John Allan Sutor (1 July 1909 – 2 December 1966) was an English first-class cricketer who played in a single match for Worcestershire against Hampshire in the last round of matches in the 1928 County Championship. He did not distinguish himself, being dismissed for 2 and 1, and he never played again.

Sutor was born in Knighton-upon-Teme, Worcestershire; he died aged 57 in Sydney, Australia.
