= Frank Adshead =

English cricketer

Cricket information
- Batting: Right-handed

Career statistics
Competition	First-class
Matches	2
Runs scored	26
Batting average	8.66
100s/50s	0/0
Top score	14
Catches/stumpings	2/–
- Source: CricInfo, 13 April 2023

Frank Hand Adshead (9 February 1894 – 22 November 1977) was an English cricketer who played two first-class matches for Worcestershire in 1927. He failed to score more than fourteen in any of his three innings.

Adshead was born in Tividale, Dudley (then in Worcestershire) and died at the age of eighty-three in Twyford Abbey, Ealing. His brother William played twelve games for Worcestershire in the 1920s, but never appeared in a match with Frank.
