= Roy Barker (cricketer) =

English cricketer (1947–2020)

Personal information
- Full name: Antony Royston Paul Barker
- Born: 30 May 1947; May Bank, Newcastle-under-Lyme, Staffordshire, England
- Died: 20 April 2020 (aged 72)
- Batting: Right-handed
- Bowling: Right-arm off-break

Domestic team information
- Years: Team
- 1967–1969: Worcestershire

Career statistics
Competition	FC	LA
Matches	27	4
Runs scored	544	47
Batting average	13.60	15.66
100s/50s	0/2	0/0
Top score	67	25
Balls bowled	0	0
Wickets	0	0
Bowling average	-	-
5 wickets in innings	0	0
10 wickets in match	0	n/a
Best bowling	-	-
Catches/stumpings	12/0	0/0
- Source: , 11 August 2008

Antony Royston Paul Barker (30 May 1947 – 20 April 2020) was a cricketer who played 27 first-class and four List A matches for Worcestershire in the late 1960s.

Barker did not enjoy particular success, reaching fifty only twice in his short career. He made 55 against Gloucestershire at Cheltenham in August 1968, and 67 almost a year later against Lancashire at Southport.
