= List of Sussex County Cricket Club players =

This is a list in alphabetical order of cricketers who have played for Sussex County Cricket Club in top-class matches since it was founded in 1839. Like the Sussex county teams formed by earlier organisations, including the old Brighton Cricket Club, the county club has always been classified as a top-class team. The players listed have played for the club in first-class cricket, List A cricket or Twenty20 cricket matches.

The details are the player's usual name followed by the years in which he was active as a Sussex player and then his name is given as it would appear on modern match scorecards. Note that many players represented other top-class teams besides Sussex. Current players are shown as active to the latest season in which they played for the club. The list has been updated to the end of the 2021 cricket season using the data published in Playfair Cricket Annual, 2022 edition.

The list excludes Second XI and other players who did not play for the club's first team; and players whose first team appearances were in minor matches only.

== A ==
- Aamer Khan (1997–1998) : Aamer Khan
- Chris Adams (1998–2008) : C. J. Adams
- Percy Adams (1922) : P. W. Adams
- Will Adkin (2010–2012) : W. A. Adkin
- Ragheb Aga (2007–2010) : R. G. Aga
- Rehan Alikhan (1986–1988) : R. I. Alikhan
- Tim Ambrose (2001–2005) : T. R. Ambrose
- Amjad Khan (2011–2012) : Amjad Khan
- Walter Andrews (1888–1892) : W. H. Andrews
- John Anscombe (1862–1866) : J. P. Anscombe
- Alexander Anstruther (1875–1878) : A. W. Anstruther
- James Anyon (2010–2014) : J. E. Anyon
- Jofra Archer (2016–2021) : J. C. Archer
- George Arlington (1894–1898) : G. H. A. Arlington
- Geoff Arnold (1978–1982) : G. G. Arnold
- Ashar Zaidi (2013–2015) : Ashar Zaidi
- Bill Athey (1993–1997) : C. W. J. Athey
- Jamie Atkins (2021) : J. A. Atkins
- Spencer Austen-Leigh (1862–1866) : S. Austen-Leigh

== B ==
- Andrew Babington (1986–1990) : A. M. Babington
- Edward Baker (1912–1919) : E. C. Baker
- John Barclay (1970–1986) : J. R. T. Barclay
- Jack Barley (1908) : J. C. Barley
- Edward Barnett (1841) : E. Barnett
- Hugh Bartlett (1937–1949) : H. T. Bartlett
- John Bartlett (1946–1950) : J. N. Bartlett
- Adam Barton (2017) : A. P. Barton
- George Barton (1835–1856) : G. Barton
- Howard Barton (1857) : H. J. Barton
- Don Bates (1950–1971) : D. L. Bates
- Justin Bates (1996–2000) : J. J. Bates
- Christopher Batt (1997) : C. J. Batt
- George Bean (1886–1898) : G. Bean
- Joseph Bean (1895–1903) : J. Bean
- Bertram Beard (1899) : B. F. Beard
- Billy Becher (1939–1945) : W. F. W. Becher
- William Beecham (1857) : W. P. Beecham
- William Beer (2007–2021) : W. A. T. Beer
- Jason Behrendorff (2019) : J. P. Behrendorff
- Ronald Bell (1957–1965) : R. V. Bell
- G. Bennett (1843) : G. Bennett (Note: Played a single match for Sussex in 1843. Other than a surname and initial, no biographical details are known.)
- Robert Bennett (1860) : R. Bennett
- Walter Bettesworth (1878–1883) : W. A. Bettesworth
- Michael Bevan (1998–2000) : M. G. Bevan
- Archibald Blaber (1890–1894) : A. Blaber
- Arthur Blackman (1881–1887) : A. Blackman
- William Blackman (1881–1884) : W. Blackman
- Peter Blake (1945–1951) : P. D. S. Blake
- Cyril Bland (1897–1904) : C. H. G. Bland
- Timothy Booth Jones (1980–1981) : T. D. Booth Jones
- Ravi Bopara (2020–2021) : R. S. Bopara
- Thomas Bourdillon (1919) : T. E. Bourdillon
- Victor Bourdillon (1919) : V. E. Bourdillon
- Ted Bowley (1912–1934) : E. H. Bowley
- Thomas Box (1826–1856) : T. Box
- Alfred Brackpool (1880–1881) : A. Brackpool
- Henry Brand, 2nd Viscount Hampden (1860–1867) : H. R. Brand
- George Brann (1883–1905) : G. Brann
- Andrew Bredin (1986) : A. M. Bredin
- Danny Briggs (2016–2019) : D. R. Briggs
- Jem Broadbridge (1815–1840) : J. Broadbridge
- Arthur Brook (1873) : A. J. Brook
- Ben Brown (2006–2021) : B. C. Brown
- Charles Brown (1876–1879) : C. A. Brown
- George Brown (1851–1858) : G. G. Brown
- Jimmy Brown (1890) : J. Brown
- Thomas Brown (1890) : T. C. Brown
- Cyril Browne (1913–1919) : C. R. Browne
- Francis Browne (1919–1932) : F. B. R. Browne
- George Browne (1864) : G. F. Browne
- George Brownrigg (1921–1922) : G. N. Brownrigg
- Tom Bruce (2018) : T. C. Bruce
- Henry Budgen (1886–1892) : H. R. Budgen
- Rodney Bunting (1988–1991) : R. A. Bunting
- Thomas Burchell (1905–1919) : T. J. Burchell
- Charles Burgess (1919) : C. T. Burgess
- Michael Burgess (2017–2019) : M. G. K. Burgess
- Peter Burgoyne (2015) : P. I. Burgoyne
- Gordon Burnham (1914) : G. L. Burnham
- Edward Bushby (1843–1854) : E. Bushby
- Tony Buss (1958–1974) : A. Buss
- Mike Buss (1961–1978) : M. A. Buss
- Cecil Butcher (1893–1896) : C. F. Butcher
- Harry Butt (1890–1912) : H. R. Butt
- John Butt (1923) : J. A. S. Butt (Note: Butt played a single first-class match in 1923. He was born at Sutton in Surrey in 1892 and educated at Marlborough College. He died at Kensington in 1966.)

== C ==
- Craig Cachopa (2014–2016) : C. Cachopa
- Freddie Calthorpe (1911–1912) : F. S. G. Calthorpe
- Alex Carey (2019) : A. T. Carey
- Paul Carey (1946–1948) : P. A. H. Carey
- Kenneth Carlisle (1927–1928) : K. R. M. Carlisle
- Amos Carpenter (1851–1857) : A. Carpenter
- Charles Carpenter (1868) : C. W. Carpenter
- James Carpenter (1997–2002) : J. R. Carpenter
- Jack Carson (2020–2021) : J. J. Carson
- Oli Carter (2021) : O.J. Carter
- Philip Cartwright (1905–1922) : P. Cartwright
- Reginald Caryer (1922) : R. G. Caryer
- Edward Cawston (1928–1931) : E. Cawston
- Michael Chadwick (2010) : M. S. Chadwick
- James Challen junior (1848–1857) : J. Challen junior
- James Challen senior (1847–1849) : J. Challen senior
- Herbert Chaplin (1905–1914) : H. P. Chaplin
- Arthur Chapman (1861–1863) : A. G. Chapman
- Alexander Charlwood (1911–1914) : A. E. Charlwood
- Charles Charlwood (1866–1870) : C. R. Charlwood
- Henry Charlwood (1865–1882) : H. R. J. Charlwood
- John Charlwood (1890) : J. A. Charlwood
- Piyush Chawla (2009–2010) : P. P. Chawla
- Giles Cheatle (1974–1979) : R. G. L. Cheatle
- Dominic Clapp (2002) : D. A. Clapp
- Augustus Clark (1886) : A. G. F. Clark
- Tom Clark (2019–2021) : T. G. R. Clark
- Andrew Clarke (1988–1990) : A. R. Clarke
- Charles Clarke (1902) : C. Clarke
- Charles Clarke (1947) : C. C. Clarke
- John Clarke (1969) : J. M. Clarke
- William Clarke (1854) : W. Clarke
- Mitchell Claydon (2020–2021) : M. E. Claydon
- Roy Cochrane (1913) : R. D. Cochrane
- Gerald Cogger (1954–1957) : G. L. Cogger
- James Coles (2020–2021) : J. M. Coles
- Percival Coles (1885) : P. Coles
- Arthur Collins (1895–1902) : A. Collins
- Frank Collins (1923) : F. Collins
- Geoffrey A. K. Collins (1928–1934) : G. A. K. Collins
- Geoffrey A. Collins (1939) : G. A. Collins
- Corey Collymore (2008–2010) : C. D. Collymore
- John Comber (1885) : J. H. Comber
- Thomas Cook (1922–1937) : T. E. R. Cook
- Graham Cooper (1955–1969) : G. C. Cooper
- Septimus Coppinger (1857–1861) : S. Coppinger
- Albert Cordingley (1901–1905) : A. Cordingley
- Jim Cornford (1931–1952) : J. H. Cornford
- Tich Cornford (1921–1947) : W. L. Cornford
- George Edward Cotterill (1869–1874) : G. E. Cotterill
- George Cotterill (1886–1890) : G. H. Cotterill
- Joseph Cotterill (1870–1888) : J. M. Cotterill
- Tony Cottey (1999–2004) : P. A. Cottey
- Ralph Cowan (1982–1983) : R. S. Cowan
- George Cox Jr (1931–1960) : G. Cox
- George Cox Sr (1895–1928) : G. R. Cox
- Henry Crocombe (2020–2021) : H. T. Crocombe
- Charles Crofts (1840) : C. D. Crofts
- Bruce Cumming (1936–1938) : B. L. Cumming
- Herbert Curteis (1873) : H. Curteis
- Herbert M. Curteis (1846–1860) : H. M. Curteis
- Robert Curteis (1873–1878) : R. M. Curteis
- Timothy Curtis (1912) : T. H. W. Curtis
- Geoffrey Cuthbertson (1920) : G. B. Cuthbertson

== D ==
- George Daniels (1830–1839) : G. Daniels
- Randle Darwall-Smith (1946) : R. F. H. Darwall-Smith
- John Davey (1869–1873) : J. G. Davey
- William Davidson (1948–1951) : W. W. Davidson
- Philip Davies (1914) : P. H. Davies
- Christian Davis (2016) : C. A. L. Davis
- Mark Davis (2001–2005) : M. J. G. Davis
- Richard Davis (1998) : R. P. Davis
- David Dean (1870–1871) : D. Dean
- Sean J N Dean (1981–1988)
- James Dean junior (1862–1866) : J. Dean junior
- Jemmy Dean (1835–1860) : J. Dean
- Leonidas de Montezuma (1898) : L. D. M. de Montezuma
- Miles Dempsey (1919) : M. C. Dempsey
- John Denman (1970–1974) : J. Denman
- John Dew (1941–1947) : J. A. Dew
- Ted Dexter (1957–1972) : E. R. Dexter
- Michael Di Venuto (1999) : M. J. Di Venuto
- George Dockrell (2015) : G. H. Dockrell
- Tony Dodemaide (1989–1991) : A. I. C. Dodemaide
- Peter Doggart (1947–1951) : A. P. Doggart
- Hubert Doggart (1943–1961) : G. H. G. Doggart
- Bradleigh Donelan (1989–1993) : B. T. P. Donelan
- Geoffrey Dowling (1911–1913) : G. C. W. Dowling
- Vasbert Drakes (1996–1997) : V. C. Drakes
- William Dudney (1887–1893) : W. H. Dudney
- John Duffield (1938–1947) : J. Duffield
- Duleepsinhji (1924–1932) : K. S. Duleepsinhji
- William Dummer (1869) : W. Dummer
- Paul Dunkels (1972) : P. R. Dunkels
- E. B. Dwyer (1904–1909) : E. B. Dwyer

== E ==
- W. Eager (1851–1854) : W. Eager (Note: Eager played just once in first-class cricket in a match for Sussex in 1854. Other than a surname and initial no biographical details are known.)
- John Eaton (1926–1946) : V. J. Eaton
- Charles Ebden (1904) : C. H. M. Ebden
- Alex Edwards (1994–1999) : A. D. Edwards
- Henry Edwards (1885) : H. R. Edwards
- Herbert Edwards (1908) : H. I. P. Edwards
- Charles Ellis (1856–1868) : C. H. Ellis
- Robert Ellis (1877–1886) : R. T. Ellis
- Charles Etheridge (1896–1901) : C. R. Etheridge
- Laurie Evans (2017–2019) : L. J. Evans
- William Evershed (1849) : W. Evershed
- Christopher Ewbank (1867–1879) : C. C. Ewbank
- George Ewbank (1857–1860) : G. H. W. Ewbank
- Mortimer Ewen (1839–1853) : M. Ewen

== F ==
- Mark Faber (1973–1976) : M. J. J. Faber
- Nick Falkner (1988–1989) : N. J. Falkner
- Edward Fawcett (1860–1863) : E. B. Fawcett
- Percy Fender (1910–1913) : P. G. H. Fender
- George Figg (1865–1866) : G. Figg
- Richard Fillery (1862–1879) : R. Fillery
- Harry Finch (2012–2020) : H. Z. Finch
- Charles Dennis Fisher (1898–1903) : C. D. Fisher
- Christopher Fletcher (1979) : C. D. B. Fletcher
- John Flowers (1905) : J. Flowers
- Denis Foreman (1952–1967) : D. J. Foreman
- Bertie Foreman (2023–) : B. Foreman
- Raymond Fox (1896–1900) : R. W. Fox
- William Francis (1877–1879) : W. Francis
- John Frazer (1921–1924) : J. E. Frazer
- Henry Frere (1868) : H. T. Frere
- C. B. Fry (1894–1908) : C. B. Fry
- Kenneth Fry (1901–1902) : K. R. B. Fry

== G ==
- George Garton (2016–2021) : G. H. S. Garton
- Joe Gatting (2008–2013) : J. S. Gatting
- Charles Gausden (1847–1851) : C. H. Gausden
- David Gay (1949) : D. W. M. Gay
- Daniel Geere (1840) : D. D. Geere
- Frank Gibb (1889–1890) : F. Gibb
- Wyatt Gibbs (1864–1865) : W. Gibbs
- Clement Gibson (1919–1926) : C. H. Gibson
- Ed Giddins (1991–1996) : E. S. H. Giddins
- David Gilbert (1851–1857) : D. Gilbert
- William Gilbert (1879) : W. Gilbert
- Arthur Gilligan (1920–1941) : A. E. R. Gilligan
- Harold Gilligan (1919–1931) : A. H. H. Gilligan
- John Glover (2011) : J. A. Glover
- Charles Godfrey (1885–1892) : C. J. M. Godfrey
- Kenneth Goldie (1900–1911) : K. O. Goldie
- George Goldsmith (1878–1879) : G. Goldsmith
- Murray Goodwin (2001–2012) : M. W. Goodwin
- Allan Gorringe (1905) : A. L. Gorringe
- Hubert Gorringe (1920) : H. M. Gorringe
- Ian Gould (1981–1991) : I. J. Gould
- Trevor Grant (1946) : T. J. D. Grant
- Peter Graves (1965–1980) : P. J. Graves
- Allan Green (1980–1989) : A. M. Green
- Charles Green (1869–1870) : C. E. Green
- Jeremy Green (2002–2007) : J. A. G. Green
- Frederick Greenfield (1873–1883) : F. F. J. Greenfield
- Keith Greenfield (1987–1999) : K. Greenfield
- Walter Greenhill (1868) : W. Greenhill
- Geoff Greenidge (1968–1975) : G. A. Greenidge
- Bill Greenwood (1933–1936) : H. W. Greenwood
- Henry Gregory (1960) : H. V. Gregory
- Tony Greig (1966–1978) : A. W. Greig
- Ian Greig (1977–1985) : I. A. Greig
- Francis Gresson (1887–1901) : F. H. Gresson
- Robert Grevett (1939) : R. G. Grevett
- William Grevett (1922) : W. S. G. Grevett
- Mike Griffith (1962–1974) : M. G. Griffith
- Billy Griffith (1937–1954) : S. C. Griffith
- George Grimston (1924–1930) : G. S. Grimston
- Jeremy Groome (1974–1978) : J. J. Groome
- George Grundy (1880) : G. G. S. Grundy
- Terry Gunn (1961–1967) : T. Gunn
- Frank Guttridge (1892–1894) : F. H. Guttridge

== H ==
- Tom Haines (2016–2021) : T. J. Haines
- Ivor Hale (1946) : I. E. Hale
- John Hale (1853–1865) : J. H. Hale
- John Hall (1960) : J. K. Hall
- Jamie Hall (1989–1996) : J. W. Hall
- William Hall (1874) : W. F. Hall
- Rory Hamilton-Brown (2007–2014) : R. J. Hamilton-Brown
- Charles Hammond (1841–1854) : C. J. Hammond
- Ernest Hammond (1870–1875) : E. Hammond
- Jim Hammond (1928–1946) : H. E. Hammond
- Robin Hanley (1990–1992) : R. Hanley
- Alan Hansford (1989–1992) : A. R. Hansford
- Henry Harben (1919) : H. E. S. Harben
- Kenneth Harding (1928) : K. Harding
- Edwin Harris (1922–1924) : E. L. J. Harris
- Ryan Harris (2008) : R. J. Harris
- Stanley Harris (1919) : S. S. Harris
- Ælfric Harrison (1913) : A. M. Harrison
- Edward Harrison (1941–1947) : E. E. Harrison
- Jock Hartley (1894–1898) : J. C. Hartley
- Hartley Hartley-Smith (1889) : H. Hartley-Smith
- Frederick Haslett (1837–1841) : F. Haslett
- Lewis Hatchett (2010–2016) : L. J. Hatchett
- Paul Havell (1999–2002) : P. M. R. Havell
- Charles Hawkins (1838–1844) : C. Hawkins
- Arthur Haygarth (1848–1860) : A. Haygarth
- Giles Haywood (1996–1999) : G. R. Haywood
- Timothy Head (1976–1981) : T. J. Head
- Travis Head (2021) : T. M. Head
- William Heasman (1885–1895) : W. G. Heasman
- Jeremy Heath (1980–1983) : J. R. P. Heath
- Sean Heather (2005–2006) : S. A. Heather
- George Helm (1860) : G. F. Helm
- Eddie Hemmings (1993–1995) : E. E. Hemmings
- Andrew Henderson (1972) : A. A. Henderson
- Peter Heseltine (1987–1988) : P. A. W. Heseltine
- Harold Heygate (1903–1919) : H. J. Heygate
- Reginald Heygate (1902–1911) : R. B. Heygate
- Arthur Hide (1881–1890) : A. B. Hide
- Jesse Hide (1876–1893) : J. B. Hide
- Kenneth Higgs (1920–1927) : K. A. Higgs
- Albert Hilton (1891–1895) : A. W. Hilton
- Tom Hinley (2021) : T. I. Hinley
- Simon Hoadley (1978–1979) : S. P. Hoadley
- Stephen Hoadley (1975–1976) : S. J. Hoadley
- Charles Hoar (1885) : C. J. Hoar
- Arthur Hoare (1869–1873) : A. Hoare
- Hamilton Hoare (1853–1854) : H. N. Hoare
- Matt Hobden (2014–2015) : M. E. Hobden
- Arthur Hobgen (1872–1873) : A. Hobgen
- Andrew Hodd (2002–2012) : A. J. Hodd
- James Hodson (1838–1854) : J. Hodson
- William Hodson (1860–1863) : W. Hodson
- Henry Holden (1853) : H. Holden
- R. L. Holdsworth (1925–1929) : R. L. Holdsworth
- Sydney Hollands (1887–1893) : S. Hollands
- Reginald Hollingdale (1925–1930) : R. A. Hollingdale
- Bernard Holloway (1911–1914) : B. H. Holloway
- Norman Holloway (1911–1925) : N. J. Holloway
- William Holloway (1890) : W. O. Holloway
- Jack Holmes (1922–1943) : A. J. Holmes
- Rodney Holmes (1943–1951) : J. R. R. Holmes
- Richard Holt (1938–1939) : R. A. A. Holt
- George Hooker (1857–1859) : G. S. Hooker
- Elliot Hooper (2019) : E. O. Hooper
- Carl Hopkinson (2001–2009) : C. D. Hopkinson
- Charles Horwood (1864–1865) : C. Horwood
- Will House (2000–2002) : W. J. House
- Charlie Howard (1874–1882) : C. Howard
- Robert Howell (1900) : R. G. D. Howell
- Christopher Howland (1960) : C. B. Howland
- Fynn Hudson-Prentice (2015–2021) : F. J. Hudson-Prentice
- Arthur Huggett (1881–1885) : A. Huggett
- George Humphreys (1869–1886) : G. T. Humphreys
- Walter Humphreys junior (1898–1900) : W. A. Humphreys junior
- Walter Humphreys senior (1870–1896) : W. A. Humphreys senior
- Shaun Humphries (1993–2000) : S. Humphries
- William Humphry (1848–1854) : W. J. Humphry
- Robert Hunt (1936–1947) : R. G. Hunt
- Sean Hunt (2021) : S. F. Hunt
- Gordon Hurst (1947–1949) : G. T. Hurst
- Paul Hutchison (2002–2003) : P. M. Hutchison
- Jake Hutson (2017) : J. W. Hutson
- John Hyde (1851–1853) : J. Hyde
- Henry Hyndman (1864–1865) : H. M. Hyndman
- Henry Rogers (2024–present) : H. P. Rogers

== I ==
- Danial Ibrahim (2021) : D. K. Ibrahim
- Imran Khan (1977–1988) : Imran Khan
- Kevin Innes (2002–2004) : K. J. Innes
- Lionel Isherwood (1925–1927) : L. C. R. Isherwood
- John Isted (1853) : J. Isted

== J ==
- Callum Jackson (2012–2013) : C. F. Jackson
- Samuel Jagger (1931) : S. T. Jagger
- Ted James (1948–1965) : A. E. James
- Paul Jarvis (1994–1998) : P. W. Jarvis
- Javed Miandad (1976–1979) : Javed Miandad
- George Jeffery (1872–1874) : G. E. Jeffery
- Don Jenner (1919–1921) : F. D. Jenner
- Jonty Jenner (2017) : J. W. Jenner
- Maurice Jewell (1914–1919) : M. F. S. Jewell
- Adrian Jones (1981–1993) : A. N. Jones
- Allan Jones (1966–1969) : A. A. Jones
- Chris Jordan (2012–2021) : C. J. Jordan
- Uday Joshi (1970–1974) : U. C. Joshi
- Ed Joyce (2008–2016) : E. C. Joyce
- Richard Juckes (1924) : R. H. Juckes
- John Juniper (1880–1885) : J. W. Juniper
- Vallance Jupp (1909–1922) : V. W. C. Jupp

== K ==
- Aneesh Kapil (2019) : A. Kapil
- Ari Karvelas (2022–) : A. Karvelas
- Chad Keegan (2009–2010) : C. B. Keegan
- Peter Kelland (1951–1952) : P. A. Kelland
- John Kelsey (1902) : J. H. Kelsey
- Charles Kennedy (1872–1879) : C. M. Kennedy
- Richard Kentfield (1894–1896) : R. W. Kentfield
- Richard Kenward (1902) : R. Kenward
- Anthony Killick (1866) : A. Killick
- Ernest Killick (1893–1913) : E. H. Killick
- Harry Killick (1866–1875) : H. Killick
- Simon Kimber (1987–1989) : S. J. S. Kimber
- George L. King (1880–1881) : G. L. King
- George W. King (1842–1864) : G. W. King
- Henry Kirby (1911) : H. R. Kirby
- Peter Kirsten (1975) : P. N. Kirsten
- James Kirtley (1995–2010) : R. J. Kirtley
- George Kirwan (1853) : G. Kirwan
- George Knight (1860–1874) : G. Knight
- Roger Knight (1976–1977) : R. D. V. Knight
- Freddie Knott (1926) : F. H. Knott
- Lance Knowles (1905) : W. L. Knowles

== L ==
- Peter Laker (1948–1949) : P. G. Laker
- Reginald Lambert (1904) : R. E. Lambert
- Arthur Lang (1911–1913) : A. H. Lang
- George Langdon (1839–1842) : G. L. Langdon
- James Langridge (1924–1955) : J. Langridge
- John Langridge (1928–1955) : J. G. Langridge
- Richard Langridge (1957–1971) : R. J. Langridge
- Percy Latham (1898–1906) : P. H. Latham
- Danny Law (1993–1996) : D. R. Law
- Arthur Lawrence (1952–1956) : A. A. K. Lawrence
- Garth Le Roux (1978–1987) : G. S. le Roux
- George Leach (1903–1914) : G. Leach
- Peter Ledden (1961–1967) : P. R. V. Ledden
- Geoffrey Lees (1951) : G. W. Lees
- Archie Lenham (2021) : A. D. Lenham
- Les Lenham (1956–1970) : L. J. Lenham
- Neil Lenham (1984–1997) : N. J. Lenham
- Euros Lewis (1967–1969) : E. J. Lewis
- Jon Lewis (2014) : J. Lewis
- Jason Lewry (1994–2009) : J. D. Lewry
- Chris Liddle (2006–2015) : C. J. Liddle
- William Lillywhite (1825–1853) : F. W. Lillywhite
- James Lillywhite (1862–1883) : James Lillywhite junior
- James Lillywhite senior (1850–1860) : James Lillywhite senior
- John Lillywhite (1850–1869) : John Lillywhite
- Tim Linley (2006–2015) : T. E. Linley
- Arnold Long (1976–1980) : A. Long
- Harry Love (1892–1894) : H. Love
- Richard Lowe (1893–1894) : R. Lowe
- Charles Lucas (1906–1908) : C. E. Lucas
- Charles Lucas (1880–1882) : C. J. Lucas
- Frederick Lucas (1880–1887) : F. M. Lucas
- Morton Lucas (1877–1890) : M. P. Lucas
- Edwin Lulham (1894) : E. P. H. Lulham
- Tony Lush (1937–2025) : J. A. Lush (Note: Played a single match for Sussex in the 1969 Player's County League, scoring 22 against Middlesex.)
- Charles Luther (1908) : A. C. G. Luther
- George Lynn (1872–1873) : G. H. Lynn

== M ==
- Matt Machan (2010–2016) : M. W. Machan
- Calum MacLeod (2020) : C. S. MacLeod
- Steve Magoffin (2012–2017) : S. J. Magoffin
- John Major (1888–1889) : J. Major
- Jack Malden (1920–1922) : W. J. Malden
- Hardit Malik (1914–1921) : H. S. Malik
- Alan Mansell (1969–1975) : A. W. Mansell
- David Mantell (1954–1958) : D. N. Mantell
- David Manville (1955–1956) : D. W. Manville
- John Mare (1870–1879) : J. M. Mare
- Robin Marlar (1951–1968) : R. G. Marlar
- Francis Marlow (1891–1904) : F. W. Marlow
- Roger Marshall (1973–1978) : R. P. T. Marshall
- Robin Martin-Jenkins (1995–2010) : R. S. C. Martin-Jenkins
- William Mason (1834–1842) : W. H. Mason
- John Mathews (1909–1930) : J. K. Mathews
- Kenneth Mathews (1950–1951) : K. P. A. Mathews
- Henry Mawle (1896) : H. E. Mawle
- Tom Mayes (1889) : T. Mayes
- Christopher Mays (1986) : C. S. Mays
- Edward McCormick (1880–1890) : E. J. McCormick
- Brendon McCullum (2010) : B. B. McCullum
- Alfred McGaw (1928) : A. J. T. McGaw
- Stuart Meaker (2020–2021) : S. C. Meaker
- William Mechen (1876–1879) : W. Mechen
- R. Medhurst (1948) : R. Medhurst
- Alan Melville (1932–1936) : A. Melville
- Gehan Mendis (1973–1985) : G. D. Mendis
- Jack Mercer (1919–1921) : J. Mercer
- William Mercer (1948–1956) : W. N. Mercer
- William Millard (1879–1881) : W. H. Millard
- Andy Miller (2013) : A. S. Miller
- E. Miller (1878) : E. Miller (Note: Miller played once for Sussex in 1878. Other than a surname and initial no biographical details are known.)
- Robert Miller (1919) : R. A. T. Miller
- Tymal Mills (2015–2021) : T. S. Mills
- George Millyard (1835–1842) : G. Millyard
- Robert Minton (1919) : R. S. Minton
- Mir Hamza (2019) : Mir Hamza
- Horace Mitchell (1882–1891) : H. Mitchell
- William Mitchell (1886) : W. H. Mitchell
- Mohammad Akram (2004) : Mohammad Akram
- Mohammad Sami (2008) : Mohammad Sami
- Richard Montgomerie (1999–2007) : R. R. Montgomerie
- Moody (1843) : Moody (Note: A single first-class appearance for Sussex. Other than a surname, no biographical details are known.)
- Peter Moores (1985–1998) : P. Moores
- David Mordaunt (1958–1960) : D. J. Mordaunt
- Jeremy Morley (1971–1976) : J. D. Morley
- P. Morris (1842) : P. Morris (Note: Played in one first-class match as well as one other match, both for Sussex teams. Other than a surname and initial, no biographical details are known.)
- Henry Munnion (1877–1880) : H. Munnion
- Billy Murdoch (1893–1899) : W. L. Murdoch
- Alan Murdoch-Cozens (1919) : A. J. Murdoch-Cozens
- Mushtaq Ahmed (2003–2008) : Mushtaq Ahmed
- Simon Myles (1987) : S. D. Myles
- Alfred Mynn (1839–1847) : A. Mynn

== N ==
- Edwin Napper (1839–1862) : E. Napper
- William Napper (1842–1870) : W. Napper
- Chris Nash (2002–2017) : C. D. Nash
- John Nason (1906–1910) : J. W. W. Nason
- John Naumann (1925) : J. H. Naumann
- Naved Arif (2011–2012) : Naved Arif
- Rana Naved-ul-Hasan (2005–2011) : Naved-ul-Hasan
- Nazir Ali (1927) : S. Nazir Ali
- John Neal (1951) : J. H. Neal
- Frank New (1890) : F. C. New
- Leonard Newbery (1925) : A. L. Newbery
- Keith Newell (1993–1998) : K. Newell
- Mark Newell (1996–1998) : M. Newell
- Billy Newham (1881–1905) : W. Newham
- Frederick Newland (1875–1879) : F. Newland
- Harry Newton (1959–1966) : H. Newton
- Benjamin Nicholls (1883–1888) : B. E. Nicholls
- Henry Nicholson (1853–1855) : H. W. L. Nicholson
- John North (1990–1995) : J. A. North
- John Nye (1934–1947) : J. K. Nye

== O ==
- Charles Oakes (1935–1954) : C. Oakes
- Jack Oakes (1937–1951) : J. Y. Oakes
- Alan Oakman (1947–1968) : A. S. M. Oakman
- William O'Byrne (1935–1942) : W. F. T. O'Byrne
- Denzil Roberts Onslow (1860–1869) : D. R. Onslow
- Ali Orr (2021) : A. G. H. Orr
- Henry Osborn (1848–1860) : H. Osborn

== P ==
- James Pagden (1858) : J. W. Pagden
- John Paine (1851–1859) : J. G. Paine
- Monty Panesar (2010–2013) : M. S. Panesar
- Paul Parker (1976–1991) : P. W. G. Parker
- Harry Parks (1926–1948) : H. W. Parks
- Jim Parks senior (1924–1944) : J. H. Parks
- Jim Parks junior (1949–1972) : J. M. Parks
- Wayne Parnell (2011) : W. D. Parnell
- George Parr (1853–1854) : G. Parr
- Frederick Parris (1890–1901) : F. Parris
- Austin Parsons (1974–1975) : A. E. W. Parsons
- Nawab of Pataudi (1957–1970) : M. A. K. Pataudi
- Edward Pattenden (1873–1875) : E. P. Pattenden
- Andrew Patterson (2000) : A. D. Patterson
- Alfred Payne (1880–1886) : A. Payne
- Charles Payne (1857–1870) : C. Payne
- George Payne (1869–1870) : G. S. Payne
- Joseph Payne (1861) : J. S. Payne
- Richard Payne (1853–1866) : R. Payne
- William Payne (1877–1883) : W. Payne
- John Peacey (1920–1922) : J. R. Peacey
- George Pearce (1928–1944) : G. S. Pearce
- William Pedley (1879) : W. E. Pedley
- Toby Peirce (1994–2000) : M. T. E. Peirce
- Anthony Pelham (1930–1931) : A. G. Pelham
- Francis Pelham, 5th Earl of Chichester (1865–1868) : F. G. Pelham
- John Penikett (1850–1851) : J. Penikett
- Charles Perkins (1884) : C. M. Perkins
- George Pescott (1840) : G. Pescott
- Henry Holroyd, 3rd Earl of Sheffield (1854) : Viscount Pevensey
- Steven Pheasant (1971) : S. T. Pheasant
- Henry Phillips (1868–1891) : H. Phillips
- James Phillips (1871–1886) : J. Phillips
- Nick Phillips (1993–1997) : N. C. Phillips
- Paul Phillipson (1970–1986) : C. P. Phillipson
- Henry Philpott (1855) : H. G. Philpott
- Francis Pickering (1874–1875) : F. P. U. Pickering
- George Picknell (1835–1854) : G. Picknell
- Robert Picknell (1837–1845) : R. Picknell
- Tony Pigott (1978–1993) : A. C. S. Pigott
- Fuller Pilch (1837–1842) : F. Pilch
- Reginald Pinfield (1922) : R. G. C. Pinfield
- Steffan Piolet (2014) : S. A. Piolet
- Charles Plumer (1861) : C. G. Plumer
- Gordon Potter (1949–1957) : G. Potter
- Bob Pountain (1960–1965) : F. R. Pountain
- Derek Preston (1959) : D. J. Preston
- Roger Prideaux (1971–1973) : R. M. Prideaux
- Meyrick Pringle (1987–1988) : M. W. Pringle
- Matt Prior (2001–2014) : M. J. Prior
- Maurice Purcell-FitzGerald (1864) : M. N. R. Purcell-FitzGerald
- Eric Puttock (1921) : E. C. Puttock
- James Pyemont (1997) : J. P. Pyemont

== Q ==
- Frank Quaife (1928) : F. C. Quaife
- Walter Quaife (1884–1891) : W. Quaife
- Willie Quaife (1891) : W. G. Quaife

== R ==
- Terence Racionzer (1967–1969) : T. B. Racionzer
- Toby Radford (1996–1997) : T. A. Radford
- Wilfrid Ramsbotham (1908–1910) : W. H. Ramsbotham
- William Randall (1849) : W. Randall
- Bernard Randolph (1856) : B. M. Randolph
- Ranjitsinhji (1895–1920) : K. S. Ranjitsinhji
- Rajesh Rao (1996–1999) : R. K. Rao
- Rashid Khan (2018–2021) : Rashid Khan
- Umer Rashid (1999–2001) : U. B. A. Rashid
- John Raven (1874) : J. E. R. Raven
- Frederick Ravenhill (1863–1867) : F. H. H. Ravenhill
- Delray Rawlins (2017–2021) : D. M. W. Rawlins
- Ollie Rayner (2006–2011) : O. P. Rayner
- Thomas Raynes (1854–1864) : T. A. Raynes
- Ernest Read (1904–1906) : E. G. Read
- Albert Reed (1867–1873) : A. A. Reed
- Walter Reed (1860) : W. B. Reed
- Dermot Reeve (1983–1987) : D. A. Reeve
- Albert Relf (1900–1921) : A. E. Relf
- Ernest Relf (1912–1914) : E. H. Relf
- Robert Relf (1905–1924) : R. R. Relf
- Carlos Remy (1989–1995) : C. C. Remy
- Dick Richards (1927–1935) : D. S. Richards
- Courtney Ricketts (1987) : C. I. O. Ricketts
- Charles Ridding (1853) : C. H. Ridding
- Michael Rippon (2012–2013) : M. J. G. Rippon
- Henry Roberts (1911–1925) : H. E. Roberts
- Jethro Robinson (1935–1936) : J. F. Robinson
- Mark Robinson (1997–2002) : M. A. Robinson
- Miles Robinson (1947) : M. T. Robinson
- Ollie Robinson (2015–2021) : O. E. Robinson
- Reginald Robotham (1946) : R. Robotham
- Andy Robson (1992) : A. G. Robson
- Angus Robson (2017) : A. J. Robson
- Claude Rubie (1930) : C. B. Rubie

== S ==
- Abidine Sakande (2016–2019) : A. Sakande
- Ian Salisbury (1989–1996) : I. D. K. Salisbury
- Philip Salt (2015–2021) : P. D. Salt
- George Salter (1864–1865) : G. F. Salter
- Richard Sampson (1881–1886) : R. K. Sampson
- John Sams (1856) : J. Sams
- Pepler Sandri (2009) : P. S. E. Sandri
- Saqlain Mushtaq (2007) : Saqlain Mushtaq
- William Sarel (1919–1921) : W. G. M. Sarel
- Joe Sarro (2021) : J. P. Sarro
- Alan Saunders (1922–1923) : A. A. Saunders
- Edward Sayres (1840) : E. Sayres
- Arthur Sclater (1879–1880) : A. W. B. Sclater
- Alastair Scott (1986) : A. M. G. Scott
- Harold Scott (1937) : H. E. Scott
- John Scott (1907–1910) : J. G. C. Scott
- Kenneth Scott (1937) : K. B. Scott
- Robert Scott (1931–1934) : R. S. G. Scott
- Christopher Scott-Malden (1920) : C. E. Scott-Malden
- Alfred Seal (1904) : A. Seal
- Kenneth Sellar (1928) : K. A. Sellar
- Derek Semmence (1956–1968) : D. J. Semmence
- John Senescall (1882–1883) : J. Senescall
- John Seymour (1904–1907) : J. Seymour
- Ajmal Shahzad (2015–2017) : A. Shahzad
- Ishant Sharma (2018) : I. Sharma
- Arthur Sharood (1879) : A. J. Sharood
- Charles Sharp (1873–1884) : C. Sharp
- Alfred Shaw (1894–1895) : A. Shaw
- Alexander Shaw (1927) : A. A. Shaw
- Will Sheffield (2020) : W. A. Sheffield
- David Sheppard (1947–1962) : D. S. Sheppard
- William Sherwin (1861) : W. L. Sherwin
- George Shoesmith (1869–1871) : G. Shoesmith
- Joseph Shoesmith (1881) : J. Shoesmith
- Thomas Shoubridge (1890) : T. E. Shoubridge
- C. H. Simmons (1920) : C. H. Simmons (Note: A single match against Oxford University in 1920. Other than a surname and initials no biographical details are known.)
- Harry Simms (1905–1913) : H. L. Simms
- Royston Simms (1912) : R. K. Simms
- John Skinner (1870–1882) : J. Skinner
- Gerald Sly (1953) : G. B. Sly
- Alfred Smith (1841–1853) : A. Smith
- Arthur Smith (1874–1880) : A. Smith
- C. Aubrey Smith (1882–1896) : C. A. Smith
- Charles L. A. Smith (1898–1911) : C. L. A. Smith
- Charles H. Smith (1861–1874) : C. H. Smith
- David J. Smith (1981–1984) : D. J. Smith
- David M. Smith (1989–1994) : D. M. Smith
- Douglas Smith (1938–1946) : D. M. Smith
- Dwayne Smith (2008–2013) : D. R. Smith
- Donald Smith (1946–1962) : D. V. Smith
- Hugh Smith (1878) : H. P. Smith
- Kevin Smith (1978) : K. B. Smith
- Liam Smith (2017) : L. P. Smith
- Steven Smith (2023) : S.P.D. Smith
- Tom Smith (2006–2009) : T. M. J. Smith
- Richard Smyth (1970) : R. N. P. Smyth
- Edward Snell (1927–1928) : E. Snell
- John Snow (1961–1977) : J. A. Snow
- William Soames (1875) : W. A. Soames
- Eknath Solkar (1969) : E. D. Solkar
- Arthur P. F. C. Somerset (1911–1943) : A. P. F. C. Somerset
- Arthur W. F. Somerset (1892–1905) : A. W. F. Somerset
- Edmund Sopp (1843–1851) : E. Sopp
- James Southerton (1858–1872) : J. Southerton
- George Sparkes (1875) : G. Sparkes
- Martin Speight (1986–1996) : M. P. Speight
- Duncan Spencer (2006) : D. J. Spencer
- John Spencer (1969–1980) : J. Spencer
- Bob Stainton (1936–1947) : R. G. Stainton
- David Standing (1983–1988) : D. K. Standing
- George Stannard (1914–1925) : G. A. Stannard
- Franklyn Stephenson (1992–1995) : F. D. Stephenson
- Stuart Still (1975–1977) : S. J. Still
- Stewart Storey (1978) : S. J. Storey
- George Street (1909–1923) : G. B. Street
- David Stripp (1955–1957) : D. A. Stripp
- Michael Strong (1996–1999) : M. R. Strong
- Henry Stubberfield (1857–1874) : H. Stubberfield
- Scott Styris (2012–2013) : S. B. Styris
- Arnold Sullivan (1901) : A. M. Sullivan
- Ken Suttle (1949–1971) : K. G. Suttle

== T ==
- Basil Talbot (1940–1947) : B. L. Talbot
- Fred Tate (1887–1905) : F. W. Tate
- Maurice Tate (1912–1942) : M. W. Tate
- Billy Taylor (1999–2003) : B. V. Taylor
- Charles Taylor (1837–1854) : C. G. Taylor
- Henry Taylor (1843) : H. C. Taylor
- James Taylor (1834–1840) : J. Taylor
- James Taylor (2013) : J. W. A. Taylor
- Neil Taylor (1997–1998) : N. R. Taylor
- Ross Taylor (2016) : L. R. P. L. Taylor
- Charlie Tear (2022) : C. J. Tear
- Henry Tebay (1886–1890) : H. Tebay
- William Tester (1878–1888) : W. A. Tester
- Rusty Theron (2012) : J. Theron
- Freeman Thomas (1886–1890) : F. Thomas
- Freeman F. Thomas (1860–1867) : F. F. Thomas
- Aaron Thomason (2019–2021) : A. D. Thomason
- Ian Thomson (1952–1972) : N. I. Thomson
- Richard Thomson (1961) : R. H. Thomson
- Michael Thornely (2006–2010) : M. A. Thornely
- Albert Thornton (1879–1881) : A. J. Thornton
- James Thornton (1880–1883) : J. R. Thornton
- James Thorpe (2010) : J. A. Thorpe
- Philip Threlfall (1988–1991) : P. W. Threlfall
- Martin Thursfield (1997) : M. J. Thursfield
- John Tillard (1942–1949) : J. R. Tillard
- Reece Topley (2019) : R. J. W. Topley
- Edward Tredcroft (1852–1860) : E. Tredcroft
- James Tredwell (2014) : J. C. Tredwell
- Arthur Trevor (1880–1882) : A. H. Trevor
- Herbert Trevor (1908) : H. E. Trevor
- Claud Tudor (1910–1911) : C. L. S. Tudor
- Roland Tudor (1912–1919) : R. G. Tudor
- Alfred Tuppin (1935–1939) : A. G. Tuppin
- Neil Turk (2002–2006) : N. R. K. Turk
- Rivers Turnbull (1877–1879) : R. M. Turnbull
- Edward Turnour, 4th Earl Winterton (1834–1856) : Earl of Winterton
- Edward Turnour, 5th Earl Winterton (1862–1867) : Viscount Turnour

== U ==
- Mark Upton (1971) : M. Upton

== V ==
- Johan van der Wath (2005) : J. J. van der Wath
- Stiaan van Zyl (2017–2021) : S. van Zyl
- John Vidler (1910–1919) : J. L. S. Vidler
- Lou Vincent (2011) : L. Vincent
- John Vincett (1907–1919) : J. H. Vincett
- Joe Vine (1896–1922) : J. Vine
- Jason Voros (2004) : J. A. Voros

== W ==
- Alan Wadey (1975) : A. N. C. Wadey
- Jack Wagener (1927–1930) : J. G. Wagener
- Leslie Waghorn (1926–1927) : L. A. Waghorn
- Peter Wales (1951) : P. J. Wales
- Chris Waller (1974–1985) : C. E. Waller
- Harrison Ward (2021) : H. D. Ward
- Ian Ward (2004–2005) : I. J. Ward
- Ian Waring (1985–1987) : I. C. Waring
- Wasim Khan (1998–2000) : Wasim Khan
- Robin Waters (1961–1965) : R. H. C. Waters
- Arthur Watson (1922–1928) : A. C. Watson
- Darsie Watson (1920) : D. Watson
- Rupert Webb (1948–1965) : R. T. Webb
- Donald Weekes (1952) : D. J. Weekes
- William Weighell (1868–1878) : W. B. Weighell
- Alan Wells (1981–1996) : A. P. Wells
- Colin Wells (1978–1993) : C. M. Wells
- Frederick Wells (1890–1891) : F. Wells jun
- George Wells (1853–1869) : G. Wells
- Luke Wells (2010–2019) : L. W. P. Wells
- Albert Wensley (1922–1936) : A. F. Wensley
- Kirk Wernars (2011–2012) : K. O. Wernars
- Kepler Wessels (1976–1980) : K. C. Wessels
- George Whatford (1904) : G. L. Whatford
- Thomas White (1928) : T. R. White
- Francis Whitfeld (1878) : F. B. Whitfeld
- George Whitfeld (1908) : G. S. Whitfeld
- Herbert Whitfeld (1878–1885) : H. Whitfeld
- Robert Whittaker (1927) : R. C. C. Whittaker
- Stuart Whittingham (2016–2018) : S. G. Whittingham
- David Wiese (2016–2021) : D. Wiese
- George Wilder (1905–1906) : G. Wilder
- Leo Williams (1919–1930) : L. Williams
- Peter Williams (1919) : P. V. Williams
- Charles Willock (1883) : C. J. Willock
- Alan Willows (1980–1983) : A. Willows
- Ronald Willson (1955–1957) : R. H. Willson
- Keith Wilson (1914–1945) : A. K. Wilson
- George Wilson (1887–1895) : G. L. Wilson
- Herbert Wilson (1913–1924) : H. L. Wilson
- Nicholas Wilton (1998–2001) : N. J. Wilton
- Christopher Winn (1948–1952) : C. E. Winn
- Lyndhurst Winslow (1875) : L. Winslow
- Octavius Winslow (1869) : O. E. Winslow
- Paul Winslow (1949) : P. L. Winslow
- John Wisden (1845–1863) : J. Wisden
- Nicholas Wisdom (1974–1975) : N. Wisdom
- Jim Wood (1936–1955) : D. J. Wood
- David Wood (1984) : D. J. Wood
- Edwin Woodhams (1905) : E. F. Woodhams
- Kenneth Woodroffe (1914) : K. H. C. Woodroffe
- Robert Wooller (1850–1853) : R. Wooller
- Frederick Worger (1892) : F. J. Worger
- Anthony Wreford-Brown (1934) : A. J. Wreford-Brown
- Damien Wright (2009) : D. G. Wright
- Luke Wright (2004–2021) : L. J. Wright
- George Wyatt (1883–1886) : G. N. Wyatt
- Charles Wynch (1852–1859) : C. G. Wynch

== Y ==
- Michael Yardy (1999–2015) : M. H. Yardy
- Yasir Arafat (2006–2010) : Yasir Arafat
- John Young (1908) : J. V. Young
- Dick Young (1905–1925) : R. A. Young

== Z ==
- Bastiaan Zuiderent (1999–2003) : B. Zuiderent

== See also ==
- List of Sussex County Cricket Club captains
