= Shoesmith =

Shoesmith is a surname, referring to a maker of horseshoes (not a cobbler). Notable people with the surname include:

- Gavin Shoesmith, Australian singer, songwriter, double bassist and bass guitarist
- George Shoesmith, English cricketer
- Joseph Shoesmith, English cricketer
- Kenneth Shoesmith (1890–1939), English naval officer and marine artist.
- Rod Shoesmith, Australian rugby league footballer
- Thomas P. Shoesmith, American diplomat who served as the ambassador of the United States to Malaysia
