= William Millard =

William Millard may refer to:

- William Millard (businessman) (born 1932), American businessman
- William Millard (cricketer) (1856–1923), English cricketer
- William Millard (politician) (1844–1921), Australian politician
- William Millard (athlete) (c.1855–1939), Australian athlete, winner of the first Stawell Gift
