= Tebay (disambiguation) =

Tebay may refer to:

== Places ==
- Tebay, village and civil parish in Cumbria, England
- Tebay River, Alaska, US

== People ==
- Charlotte Tebay (born c. 1819), English philatelist
- Henry Tebay (born 1866), English cricketer with Sussex
- Kevan Tebay (born 1936), English cricketer with Lancashire
