= Richard Holt =

Richard Holt may refer to:

- Richard Holt (MP for Langbaurgh) (1931–1991), British Conservative Member of Parliament
- Richard Holt (cricketer) (1920–2001), English cricketer
- Sir Richard Durning Holt (1868–1941), British Liberal Party politician, MP for Hexham
- Richard Holt (died 1710), MP for Lymington, and for Petersfield
- Ric Holt, computer science professor
- Ashton Dearholt (1894–1942), American silent film actor

== See also ==
- Holt (surname)
