= Pescott =

Pescott is a surname. Notable people with the surname include:

- Edward Edgar Pescott (1872–1954), Australian naturalist
- George Pescott (1806–?), cricketer
- Richard Pescott (1905–1986), Australian botanist
- Trevor Pescott (born 1934), Australian naturalist, conservationist, and writer

== See also ==
- Prescott (surname)
