= George Kirwan =

English cricketer

Personal information
- Full name: George Kirwan
- Born: c. 1830; England
- Died: 23 July 1899 (aged 68–69); Bedford, Bedfordshire, England
- Batting: Unknown

Domestic team information
- Years: Team
- 1853: Sussex

Career statistics
Competition	First-class
Matches	3
Runs scored	43
Batting average	8.60
100s/50s	–/–
Top score	18*
Balls bowled	–
Wickets	–
Bowling average	–
5 wickets in innings	–
10 wickets in match	–
Best bowling	–
Catches/stumpings	–/–
- Source: Cricinfo, 18 December 2011

George Kirwan (c. 1830 – 23 July 1899) was an English cricketer. Kirwan's batting style is unknown.

Kirwan made his first-class debut for England against the Marylebone Cricket Club in July 1853 at Lord's. In England's first-innings he was run out for a single run, while in their second-innings he was dismissed for 3 runs by William Hillyer. The Marylebone Cricket Club won by 80 runs. He made his only first-class appearance for Sussex in September 1853 against Nottinghamshire at the Royal Brunswick Ground, Hove. In Sussex's first-innings, Kirwan scored 11 runs before being dismissed by William Clarke, while in their second-innings he was dismissed for 6 runs by James Grundy. Nottinghamshire won the match by an innings and 8 runs. He made his final first-class appearance in September 1853 for the Gentlemen of England against the United England Eleven at the Royal Brunswick Ground. In the Gentlemen's first-innings, Kirwan scored 4 runs before being dismissed by John Hyde, while in their second-innings he finished not out on 18. The United England Eleven won the match by 7 wickets.

He died on 23 July 1899 at Bedford, Bedfordshire.
