= Charles Willock =

English cricketer

Personal information
- Full name: Charles Johnstone Willock
- Born: 8 April 1862; Shahjehanpore, North-Western Provinces, India
- Died: 19 March 1919 (aged 56); Ryde, Isle of Wight, England
- Batting: Right-handed
- Bowling: Right-arm medium

Domestic team information
- Years: Team
- 1883: Sussex
- 1883: Cambridge University

Career statistics
Competition	First-class
Matches	2
Runs scored	14
Batting average	4.66
100s/50s	–/–
Top score	8*
Balls bowled	184
Wickets	3
Bowling average	11.33
5 wickets in innings	–
10 wickets in match	–
Best bowling	2/18
Catches/stumpings	2/–
- Source: Cricinfo, 22 January 2013

Charles Johnstone Willock (8 April 1862 – 19 March 1919) was an English cricketer. Willock was a right-handed batsman who bowled right-arm medium pace. He was born at Shahjehanpore in India.

Educated at Wellington College and later attending Trinity Hall, Cambridge, Willock made a single first-class appearance for Cambridge University against the Marylebone Cricket Club at Fenner's in 1883. He was dismissed in Cambridge University's first-innings of 100 for a duck by Wilfred Flowers, while in the Marylebone Cricket Club's first-innings of 159 he took the wickets of Billy Gunn and Percy de Paravicini to finish with figures of 2/18 from 28 overs. In the university's second-innings of 65, he was once again dismissed for a duck by Flowers, while in the Marylebone Cricket Club's successful chase, he dismissed Gunn for a second time. Later that season he made a single first-class appearance for Sussex against Hampshire at Day's Antelope Ground. In Hampshire's first-innings of 110, he bowled ten wicketless overs which conceded 5 runs, while he ended Sussex's first-innings of 94 unbeaten on 8. In Hampshire's second-innings of 180, he bowled five wicketless overs which conceded 9 runs. In Sussex's second-innings of 165, he was dismissed for 6 runs by William Dible, with Hampshire winning the match by 31 runs.

He died at Ryde on the Isle of Wight on 19 March 1919.
