= Reginald Caryer =

English cricketer

Personal information
- Full name: Reginald George Caryer
- Born: 28 September 1895; Hougham, Kent, England
- Died: 7 June 1957 (aged 61); Reading, Berkshire, England
- Batting: Right-handed
- Bowling: Right-arm medium-fast

Domestic team information
- Years: Team
- 1928–1935: Berkshire
- 1922: Sussex

Career statistics
Competition	First-class
Matches	1
Runs scored	12
Batting average	6.00
100s/50s	–/–
Top score	7
Balls bowled	12
Wickets	–
Bowling average	–
5 wickets in innings	–
10 wickets in match	–
Best bowling	–
Catches/stumpings	–/–
- Source: Cricinfo, 9 December 2011

Reginald George Caryer (28 September 1895 – 7 June 1957) was an English cricketer. Caryer was a right-handed batsman who bowled right-arm medium-fast. He was born at Hougham, Kent.

Caryer made a single first-class appearance for Sussex against Essex at the County Ground, Leyton in the 1922 County Championship. In Sussex's first-innings, he was dismissed for 5 runs by Jack Russell, while in their second-innings he was dismissed by Laurie Eastman for 7 runs. Essex won the match by 127 runs. This was his only major appearance for Sussex.

He later played for Berkshire in the Minor Counties Championship, making his debut against Oxfordshire in 1928. He played Minor counties cricket for Berkshire infrequently until 1935, making a total of twelve appearances. He died at Reading, Berkshire on 7 June 1957.
