= Charles Hoar =

English cricketer

Personal information
- Full name: Charles James Hoar
- Born: 28 July 1862; Witley, Surrey, England
- Died: 25 June 1913 (aged 50); Ash Vale, Surrey, England
- Batting: Right-handed
- Bowling: Unknown

Domestic team information
- Years: Team
- 1885: Sussex

Career statistics
Competition	First-class
Matches	1
Runs scored	12
Batting average	12.00
100s/50s	–/–
Top score	8
Balls bowled	48
Wickets	–
Bowling average	–
5 wickets in innings	–
10 wickets in match	–
Best bowling	–
Catches/stumpings	–/–
- Source: Cricinfo, 11 December 2011

Charles James Hoar (28 July 1862 – 25 June 1913) was an English cricketer. Hoar was a right-handed batsman, though his bowling style is unknown. He was born at Witley, Surrey.

Hoar made a single first-class appearance for Sussex against Hampshire at the County Ground, Southampton in 1885. In Sussex's first-innings he ended unbeaten on 4. In Sussex's second innings, he was dismissed for 8 runs by William Dible, with Hampshire winning by 101 runs. This was his only major appearance for Sussex.

He died at Ash Vale, Surrey on 25 June 1913.
