= Eric Puttock =

English cricketer

Personal information
- Full name: Eric Clarence Puttock
- Born: 2 March 1900; Billingshurst, Sussex, England
- Died: 14 December 1969 (aged 69); Slinfold, Sussex, England
- Batting: Unknown

Domestic team information
- Years: Team
- 1921: Sussex

Career statistics
| Competition | First-class |
|---|---|
| Matches | 2 |
| Runs scored | 9 |
| Batting average | 2.25 |
| 100s/50s | –/– |
| Top score | 5 |
| Balls bowled | – |
| Wickets | – |
| Bowling average | – |
| 5 wickets in innings | – |
| 10 wickets in match | – |
| Best bowling | – |
| Catches/stumpings | –/– |
- Source: Cricinfo, 10 December 2011

Eric Clarence Puttock (2 March 1900 – 14 December 1969) was an English cricketer. Puttock's batting style is unknown. He was born at Billingshurst, Sussex and was educated at Dover College.

Puttock made two first-class appearances for Sussex in the 1921 County Championship against Warwickshire and Essex. In the match against Warwickshire, Puttock was dismissed for 5 runs in Sussex's first-innings by Freddie Calthorpe, while in their second-innings he was dismissed by Harry Howell for a duck. Sussex won the match by 80 runs. Against Essex, he was dismissed for a duck in Sussex's first-innings by Laurie Eastman, while in their second-innings he was promoted to open the batting, scoring 4 runs before he was caught by Colin McIver off the bowling of Johnny Douglas. Sussex won the match by 6 wickets.

He died at Slinfold, Sussex on 14 December 1969.
