= Edward Pattenden =

English cricketer

Personal information
- Full name: Edward Peter Pattenden
- Born: 31 October 1842; Brighton, Sussex, England
- Died: 3 June 1879 (aged 36); Brighton, Sussex, England
- Batting: Right-handed
- Bowling: Unknown

Domestic team information
- Years: Team
- 1873–1875: Sussex

Career statistics
Competition	First-class
Matches	4
Runs scored	6
Batting average	1.50
100s/50s	–/–
Top score	3*
Balls bowled	104
Wickets	–
Bowling average	–
5 wickets in innings	–
10 wickets in match	–
Best bowling	–
Catches/stumpings	1/–
- Source: Cricinfo, 15 December 2011

Edward Peter Pattenden (31 October 1842 – 3 June 1879) was an English cricketer. Pattenden was a right-handed batsman, though his bowling style is unknown. He was born at Brighton, Sussex.

Hammond made his first-class debut for Sussex against Yorkshire at Bramall Lane, Sheffield in 1873. He made three further first-class appearances for Sussex, the last of which came against Hampshire in 1875 at the Green Jackets Ground, Winchester. He struggled in his four first-class matches, scoring just 6 runs at an average of 1.50, with a high score of 3 not out, while with the ball he bowled a total of 26 wicketless overs.

He died at the town of his birth on 3 June 1879.
