= Frederick Newland =

English cricketer

Personal information
- Full name: Frederick Newland
- Born: 14 January 1850; Henfield, Sussex, England
- Died: 10 August 1921 (aged 71); Kingston by Sea, Sussex, England
- Batting: Right-handed
- Bowling: Right-arm roundarm fast

Domestic team information
- Years: Team
- 1875–1879: Sussex

Career statistics
Competition	First-class
Matches	3
Runs scored	11
Batting average	3.66
100s/50s	–/–
Top score	7*
Balls bowled	180
Wickets	2
Bowling average	39.50
5 wickets in innings	–
10 wickets in match	–
Best bowling	2/46
Catches/stumpings	1/–
- Source: Cricinfo, 26 February 2012

Frederick Newland (14 January 1850 – 10 August 1921) was an English cricketer. Newland was a right-handed batsman who bowled right-arm roundarm fast. He was born at Henfield, Sussex.

Newland made his first-class debut for Sussex against Kent in 1875. He made two further first-class appearances for Sussex, one further match in 1875 against Gloucestershire, and one in 1879 against the Marylebone Cricket Club. In his three first-class matches, he scored a total of 11 runs at an average of 3.66, with a high score of 7 not out. With the ball, he took 2 wickets at a bowling average of 39.50, with best figures of 2/46.

He died at Kingston by Sea, Sussex, on 10 August 1921.
