= Howard Barton =

English cricketer

Personal information
- Full name: Howard James Barton
- Born: 10 July 1836; Dartford, Kent, England
- Died: 11 October 1922 (aged 86); Hove, Sussex, England
- Batting: Unknown

Domestic team information
- Years: Team
- 1857: Sussex

Career statistics
Competition	First-class
Matches	2
Runs scored	14
Batting average	7.00
100s/50s	–/–
Top score	12
Balls bowled	–
Wickets	–
Bowling average	–
5 wickets in innings	–
10 wickets in match	–
Best bowling	–
Catches/stumpings	1/–
- Source: Cricinfo, 8 January 2012

Howard James Barton (10 July 1836 – 11 October 1922) was an English cricketer. Barton's batting style is unknown. He was born at Dartford, Kent.

Barton made a single first-class appearance the Gentlemen of England against the Gentlemen of Kent and Sussex at Lord's in 1856. In the Gentlemen of England's first-innings, Barton was dismissed for 12 runs by Tom Wills, with the team making a total of 195. The Gentlemen of Kent and Sussex made 91 in their first-innings and were made to follow-on in their second, making 168 all out. This left the Gentlemen of England with a target of 65, which they reached with 8 wickets to spare. The following year he made a second first-class appearance for Sussex against Surrey at The Oval. Surrey made 166 in their first-innings, with Sussex replied poorly in their first-innings, making just 35, with Barton being dismissed for a duck by George Griffith. Sussex were made to follow-on in their second-innings, faring in this innings than they did in their first, making just 31. Barton ended the innings not out on 2, with Surrey winning by an innings and 100 runs. This was his only major appearance for Sussex.

He died at Hove, Sussex on 11 October 1922.
