= Geoffrey Dowling =

Australian cricketer

Geoffrey Charles Walter Dowling (12 August 1891 – 30 July 1915) was an Australian cricketer active from 1911 to 1913 who played for Sussex. He was born in Melbourne and died in Hooge, Belgium during the First World War, serving as a captain in the 7th Battalion of the King's Royal Rifle Corps. He appeared in four first-class matches and scored 123 runs with a highest score of 48.
