= William Francis (cricketer) =

English cricketer

Personal information
- Full name: William Francis
- Born: 21 March 1856; Little Waltham, Essex, England
- Died: 28 April 1917 (aged 61); Forest Gate, Essex, England
- Batting: Right-handed

Domestic team information
- Years: Team
- 1877–1879: Sussex

Career statistics
Competition	First-class
Matches	9
Runs scored	83
Batting average	6.91
100s/50s	–/–
Top score	17
Balls bowled	–
Wickets	–
Bowling average	–
5 wickets in innings	–
10 wickets in match	–
Best bowling	–
Catches/stumpings	5/–
- Source: Cricinfo, 30 September 2012

William Francis (21 March 1856 – 28 April 1917) was an English cricketer. Francis was a right-handed batsman. He was born at Little Waltham, Essex.

Francis made his first-class debut for Sussex against Lancashire in 1877 at the Old Trafford. He made eight further first-class appearances for Sussex, the last of which came against the Marylebone Cricket Club at Lord's in 1879. In his nine first-class appearances, he scored a total of 83 runs at an average of 6.91, with a high score of 17.

He died at Forest Gate, Essex, on 28 April 1917.
