= Jeremy Heath =

English cricketer

Personal information
- Full name: Jeremy Richard Percy Heath
- Born: 26 April 1959 (age 67); Turners Hill, Sussex, England
- Batting: Left-handed

Domestic team information
- Years: Team
- 1980–1983: Sussex

Career statistics
Competition	First-class	List A
Matches	17	3
Runs scored	611	37
Batting average	22.62	18.50
100s/50s	1/1	–/–
Top score	101*	33
Balls bowled	48	–
Wickets	–	–
Bowling average	–	–
5 wickets in innings	–	–
10 wickets in match	–	–
Best bowling	–	–
Catches/stumpings	6/–	1/–
- Source: Cricinfo, 6 January 2012

Jeremy Richard Percy Heath (born 26 April 1959) is a former English cricketer. Heath was a left-handed batsman. He was born at Turners Hill, Sussex.

Heath made his first-class debut for Sussex against Yorkshire in the 1980 County Championship. He made sixteen further first-class appearances for the county, the last of which came against Warwickshire in the 1983 County Championship. In his seventeen first-class matches, he scored a total of 611 runs at an average of 22.62, with a high score of 101 not out. This score was his only first-class century and came against the touring Sri Lankans in 1981. Heath also made three List A appearances for Sussex, two in the 1980 John Player League against Yorkshire and Hampshire, and one in the 1981 John Player League against Nottinghamshire. He scored a total of 37 runs in these three matches, at an average of 18.50, with a high score of 33.
