= Philip Threlfall =

English cricketer

Personal information
- Full name: Philip Walter Threlfall
- Born: 11 February 1967 (age 59); Barrow-in-Furness, Lancashire, England
- Batting: Right-handed
- Bowling: Right-arm medium-fast

Domestic team information
- Years: Team
- 1988–1991: Sussex
- 1987: Cumberland

Career statistics
Competition	First-class	List A
Matches	3	1
Runs scored	–	17
Batting average	–	–
100s/50s	–/–	–/–
Top score	–	17*
Balls bowled	276	60
Wickets	7	3
Bowling average	18.57	13.33
5 wickets in innings	–	–
10 wickets in match	–	–
Best bowling	3/45	3/40
Catches/stumpings	–/–	–/–
- Source: Cricinfo, 6 January 2012

Philip Walter Threlfall (born 11 February 1967) is a former English cricketer. Threlfall was a right-handed batsman who bowled right-arm medium-fast. He was born at Barrow-in-Furness, Lancashire.

Threfall played for Cumberland in 1987, making a single appearance in the Minor Counties Championship against Cambridgeshire and a single appearance in the MCCA Knockout Trophy against Cheshire. In 1988, Threfall played Second XI cricket for Sussex, with him also making his first-class debut for the county in that season against Somerset at the Recreation Ground, Bath. He played regularly for the Sussex Second XI, but would only make two further first-class appearances for the county, against the touring Sri Lankans in 1990 and Cambridge University in 1991. He never batted in his three first-class appearances, but with the ball he took 7 wickets at an average of 18.57, with best figures of 3/45. He also made a single List A appearance for the county against the touring Zimbabweans in 1990. He ended Sussex's innings of 233/8 unbeaten on 17, while in the Zimbabweans innings he took figures of 3/40 from 10 overs, with Sussex winning by 95 runs. He continued to play for the Sussex Second XI until 1994.
