= Sydney Hollands =

English cricketer

Personal information
- Full name: Sydney Hollands
- Born: 24 January 1866; East Grinstead, Sussex, England
- Died: 28 April 1949 (aged 83); Croydon, Surrey, England
- Batting: Unknown
- Bowling: Unknown

Domestic team information
- Years: Team
- 1887–1893: Sussex

Career statistics
Competition	First-class
Matches	11
Runs scored	154
Batting average	7.33
100s/50s	–/–
Top score	21
Balls bowled	–
Wickets	–
Bowling average	–
5 wickets in innings	–
10 wickets in match	–
Best bowling	–
Catches/stumpings	6/–
- Source: Cricinfo, 16 December 2011

Sydney Hollands (24 January 1866 – 28 April 1949) was an English cricketer. Hollands' batting and bowling styles are unknown. He was born at East Grinstead, Sussex.

Hollands made his first-class debut for Sussex against the Marylebone Cricket Club at Lord's in 1887. He made ten further first-class appearances for the county, the last of which came against Yorkshire in the 1893 County Championship. In his eleven matches, he scored a total of 154 runs at an average of 7.33, with a high score of 21.

He died at Croydon, Surrey on 28 April 1949.
