= Edwin Woodhams =

English cricketer

Personal information
- Full name: Edwin Fehrsen Woodhams
- Born: 22 February 1880; Seaford, Sussex, England
- Died: 8 February 1933 (aged 52); Withdean, Sussex, England
- Batting: Unknown
- Bowling: Unknown

Domestic team information
- Years: Team
- 1905: Sussex

Career statistics
Competition	First-class
Matches	1
Runs scored	14
Batting average	–
100s/50s	–/–
Top score	14*
Balls bowled	–
Wickets	–
Bowling average	–
5 wickets in innings	–
10 wickets in match	–
Best bowling	–
Catches/stumpings	1/–
- Source: Cricinfo, 16 December 2011

Edwin Fehrsen Woodhams (22 February 1880 – 8 February 1933) was an English cricketer. Woodham's batting and bowling styles are unknown. He was born at Seaford, Sussex.

Woodhams made a single first-class appearance for Sussex against Somerset at County Ground, Hove in the 1905 County Championship. He was dismissed for a duck in Sussex's first-innings by Len Braund, while in their second-innings he ended unbeaten on 14 to guide Sussex to a 2 wicket win. This was his only major appearance for Sussex.

He died at Withdean, Sussex on 8 February 1933.
