= George Salter (cricketer) =

English cricketer

Personal information
- Full name: George Frank Salter
- Born: 18 April 1824; Brighton, Sussex, England
- Died: 15 August 1911 (aged 87); Chichester, Sussex, England
- Batting: Unknown
- Bowling: Unknown

Domestic team information
- Years: Team
- 1864: Sussex

Career statistics
Competition	First-class
Matches	1
Runs scored	19
Batting average	19.00
100s/50s	–/–
Top score	15
Balls bowled	–
Wickets	–
Bowling average	–
5 wickets in innings	–
10 wickets in match	–
Best bowling	–
Catches/stumpings	1/–
- Source: Cricinfo, 14 December 2011

George Frank Salter (18 April 1834 – 15 August 1911) was an English cricketer. Salter's batting and bowling styles are unknown. He was born at Brighton, Sussex.

Salter made a single first-class appearance for Sussex against Kent at Clifton Villa Estate, Margate in 1864. In this match, he opened the batting in Sussex's first-innings and scored 15 runs before he was run out. He ended Sussex's second-innings unbeaten on 4, with Sussex winning by 9 wickets. This was his only major appearance for Sussex.

He later stood as an umpire in a first-class match between Sussex and Cambridge University at the County Ground, Hove in 1889. He died at Chichester, Sussex on 15 August 1911.
