= Amos Carpenter =

English cricketer

Personal information
- Full name: Amos Carpenter
- Born: 30 October 1832; Chalvington, Sussex, England
- Died: 1866 (aged 33/34); Lewes, Sussex, England
- Batting: Unknown
- Bowling: Unknown

Domestic team information
- Years: Team
- 1853–1857: Sussex

Career statistics
Competition	First-class
Matches	4
Runs scored	20
Batting average	3.33
100s/50s	–/–
Top score	14
Balls bowled	84
Wickets	–
Bowling average	–
5 wickets in innings	–
10 wickets in match	–
Best bowling	–
Catches/stumpings	3/–
- Source: Cricinfo, 7 January 2012

Amos Carpenter (30 October 1832 – 1866) was an English cricketer. Carpenter's batting and bowling styles are unknown. He was born at Chalvington, Sussex.

Carpenter made his first-class debut for Sussex against Nottinghamshire in 1853. He made three further first-class appearances for the county, the last of which came against Surrey in 1857. He scored a total of 20 runs in his four matches, which came at an average of 3.33, with a high score of 14.

He died at Lewes, Sussex in 1866, though the exact date is unknown.
