= William Mitchell (cricketer, born 1859) =

English cricketer

Personal information
- Full name: William Henry Mitchell
- Born: 20 January 1859; Arundel, Sussex, England
- Died: 16 November 1929 (aged 70); Southwater, Sussex, England
- Batting: Unknown
- Bowling: Unknown

Domestic team information
- Years: Team
- 1886: Sussex

Career statistics
Competition	First-class
Matches	2
Runs scored	8
Batting average	2.00
100s/50s	–/–
Top score	4
Catches/stumpings	–/–
- Source: Cricinfo, 16 December 2011

William Henry Mitchell (20 January 1859 – 16 November 1929) was an English cricketer. Mitchell's batting and bowling styles are unknown. He was born at Arundel, Sussex.

Mitchell made two first-class appearances for Sussex in 1886 against Kent at County Ground, Hove and Nottinghamshire at Trent Bridge. Against Kent, Mitchell scored 3 runs in Sussex's first-innings before being dismissed by Jimmy Wootton. In Sussex's second-innings he was dismissed by the same bowler for a duck, with Kent winning the match by 4 wickets. Against Nottinghamshire, he was dismissed for a single run in Sussex's first-innings by Wilfred Flowers. In their second-innings he was dismissed by William Attewell for 4 runs, with Nottinghamshire winning by an innings and 15 runs.

He died at Southwater, Sussex on 16 November 1929.
