= Peter Blake (cricketer) =

English cricketer

Peter Douglas Stuart Blake (23 May 1927 – 11 December 2011) was an English cricketer and clergyman. In cricket he was active from 1946 to 1953, playing for Sussex.

Blake was born in Calcutta and died in Tynron, Dumfriesshire. He appeared in 58 first-class matches as a right-handed batsman, scoring 2,067 runs with a highest score of 130.

After his schooling at Eton College, Blake served his national service in Germany after the end of World War II, where he witnessed the trials of the officers who had staffed the Ravensbrück concentration camp. The experience led him to decide to devote his career to the church. Blake studied Theology at Brasenose College, Oxford, and was then ordained as an Anglican clergyman. He served as rector of Mufulira, in Northern Rhodesia. In Zambia, as Northern Rhodesia became on independence, he was chairman of the Zambian Anglican Youth Council and ran a youth soccer team, was an adviser on religious programs for TV and radio, and produced Passion and Nativity plays.
