= George Arlington =

English cricketer

George Harewood Ashley Arlington (28 May 1871 – unknown; born in Dover) was an English cricketer active from 1894 to 1898 who played for Sussex. He appeared in 29 first-class matches as a righthanded batsman and wicketkeeper. He scored 614 runs with a highest score of 73 and completed 27 catches with three stumpings.
