= Courtney Ricketts =

English cricketer

Personal information
- Full name: Courtney Ian Oswald Ricketts
- Born: 26 April 1965 (age 61); Kennington, London, England
- Batting: Right-handed
- Bowling: Slow left-arm orthodox

Domestic team information
- Years: Team
- 1987: Sussex

Career statistics
Competition	First-class	List A
Matches	3	6
Runs scored	29	10
Batting average	29.00	5.00
100s/50s	–/–	–/–
Top score	29	9
Balls bowled	430	222
Wickets	5	3
Bowling average	50.60	50.66
5 wickets in innings	–	–
10 wickets in match	–	–
Best bowling	2/40	1/25
Catches/stumpings	1/–	1/–
- Source: Cricinfo, 6 January 2012

Courtney Ian Oswald Ricketts (born 26 April 1965) is a former English cricketer. Ricketts was a right-handed batsman who bowled slow left-arm orthodox. He was born at Kennington, London.

Ricketts made his first-class debut for Sussex against Gloucestershire in the 1987 County Championship. He made two further first-class appearances for the county in that season, against Worcestershire and Hampshire. In his three first-class matches, he took 5 wickets at an average of 50.60, with best figures of 2/40. Ricketts made his List A debut for the county in the same season against Glamorgan in the Benson & Hedges Cup. He made five further List A appearances that season, the last of which came against Cumberland in the NatWest Trophy. He took 3 wickets in his five List A matches, which came at an average of 50.66, with best figures of 1/25. He left Sussex at the end of that season, proceeding to play Second XI cricket for Gloucestershire, Surrey and Essex, but he was unable to establish himself at either of these counties.
