= Roy Cochrane =

English cricketer

Personal information
- Full name: Roy Dundonald Cochrane
- Born: 13 February 1892; Kensington, London, England
- Died: 5 December 1968 (aged 76); Kensington, London, England
- Batting: Unknown
- Bowling: Unknown

Domestic team information
- Years: Team
- 1913: Sussex

Career statistics
Competition	First-class
Matches	1
Runs scored	6
Batting average	6.00
100s/50s	–/–
Top score	6
Balls bowled	42
Wickets	2
Bowling average	18.50
5 wickets in innings	–
10 wickets in match	–
Best bowling	3/37
Catches/stumpings	–/–
- Source: Cricinfo, 11 December 2011

Roy Dundonald Cochrane (13 February 1892 – 5 December 1968) was an English cricketer. Cochrane's batting and bowling styles are unknown. He was born at Kensington, London and educated at Marlborough College.

Cochrane made a single first-class appearance for Sussex against Cambridge University at Fenner's, Cambridge in 1913. In Sussex's first-innings he was dismissed for 6 runs by Henry Mulholland. He took the wickets of John Naumann and Samuel McCaughey, finishing with figures of 2/37 from seven overs. He wasn't required to bat in Sussex's second-innings, as they won the match by 5 wickets. This was his only major appearance for Sussex.

He died at Kensington, London on 5 December 1968.
