= John Duffield (cricketer) =

English cricketer

John Duffield (12 August 1917 – 7 September 1956) was an English cricketer active from 1938 to 1947 who played for Sussex. He was born and died in Worthing. He appeared in sixteen first-class matches as a righthanded batsman who bowled right arm fast medium. He scored 263 runs with a highest score of 60 not out and took 29 wickets with a best performance of five for 38.
