= William Mechen =

English cricketer

Personal information
- Full name: William Mechen
- Born: 1 August 1852; Southwick, Sussex, England
- Died: 10 March 1880 (aged 27); Southwick, Sussex, England
- Batting: Right-handed

Domestic team information
- Years: Team
- 1876–1879: Sussex

Career statistics
Competition	First-class
Matches	4
Runs scored	43
Batting average	5.37
100s/50s	–/–
Top score	20
Balls bowled	–
Wickets	–
Bowling average	–
5 wickets in innings	–
10 wickets in match	–
Best bowling	–
Catches/stumpings	7/–
- Source: Cricinfo, 16 December 2011

William Mechen (8 January 1852 – 10 March 1880) was an English cricketer. Mechen was a right-handed batsman. He was born at Southwick, Sussex.

Mechen made his first-class debut for Sussex against Gloucestershire at County Ground, Hove in 1876. He made three further first-class appearances for Sussex, the last of which came against Kent in 1879 at the Old County Ground, West Malling. In his four first-class matches, he scored 43 runs at an average of 5.37, with a high score of 20.

He died at the village of his birth on 10 March 1880.
