= Frank New =

English cricketer

Frank Chandler New (25 December 1859 – 25 March 1924) was an English cricketer who played in three first-class cricket matches for Sussex in 1890. He was a right-handed batsman and a right-arm medium-pace bowler. He was born and died in Southwick, Sussex.

New played in three of the first four games played by Sussex in the inaugural County Championship season. He made his debut against Gloucestershire, and batted as an opener in that game; his highest score, 43, came in a match against Yorkshire in which he was sent to the middle order for the second innings. He did not bowl in first-class cricket.
