= William Beecham =

English cricketer

Personal information
- Full name: William Pain Beecham
- Born: 1799; England
- Died: 5 May 1869 (aged 69/70); St Leonards-on-Sea, Sussex, England

Domestic team information
- Years: Team
- 1857: Sussex

Career statistics
Competition	First-class
Matches	1
Runs scored	3
Batting average	1.50
100s/50s	0/0
Top score	2
Catches/stumpings	1/–
- Source: Cricinfo, 17 December 2011

William Pain Beecham (1799 – 5 May 1869) was an English cricketer.

Beecham made a single first-class cricket appearance for Sussex County Cricket Club against the Marylebone Cricket Club at the East Sussex Cricket Ground in 1857. He was aged 57 or 58 when he made his only first-class appearance. In the match, Beecham was run out for a single run in Sussex's first-innings, while in their second-innings he was dismissed for 2 runs by Will Martingell. Sussex won the match by 70 runs.

He died at St Leonards-on-Sea, Sussex on 5 May 1869.
