= John Raven (cricketer) =

English cricketer (1851–1940)

Personal information
- Full name: John Earle Reynolds Raven
- Born: 23 February 1851; Broughton Astley, Leicestershire, England
- Died: 3 April 1940 (aged 89); Nutfield, Surrey, England
- Batting: Right-handed
- Bowling: Right-arm fast-medium

Domestic team information
- Years: Team
- 1874: Sussex

Career statistics
| Competition | First-class |
|---|---|
| Matches | 1 |
| Runs scored | 14 |
| Batting average | 7.00 |
| 100s/50s | –/– |
| Top score | 10 |
| Balls bowled | 72 |
| Wickets | – |
| Bowling average | – |
| 5 wickets in innings | – |
| 10 wickets in match | – |
| Best bowling | – |
| Catches/stumpings | –/– |
- Source: Cricinfo, 14 December 2011

John Earle Reynolds Raven (23 April 1851 – 3 April 1940) was an English cricketer. Raven was a right-handed batsman who bowled right-arm fast-medium. He was born at Broughton Astley, Leicestershire.

Raven made a single first-class appearance for Sussex against Surrey at The Oval in 1874. In this match, he bowled 18 wicketless overs in Surrey's first-innings as they compiled 348 all out, while in Sussex's first-innings he batted at number eleven and was dismissed for 10 runs by James Southerton, with Sussex being dismissed for 147. Sussex were forced to follow-on, with Raven scoring 4 runs before being dismissed by James Street, with Sussex being dismissed for 199. Surrey won the match by an innings and 2 runs. This was his only major appearance for Sussex.

Raven died at Nutfield, Surrey on 3 April 1940, at the age of 89.
