= William Randall (cricketer) =

English cricketer

Personal information
- Full name: William Randall
- Born: c. 1823; England
- Died: 17 February 1877 (aged 53–54); Northchapel, Sussex, England
- Batting: Unknown

Domestic team information
- Years: Team
- 1849: Sussex

Career statistics
Competition	First-class
Matches	1
Runs scored	3
Batting average	3.00
100s/50s	–/–
Top score	3
Balls bowled	–
Wickets	–
Bowling average	–
5 wickets in innings	–
10 wickets in match	–
Best bowling	–
Catches/stumpings	–/–
- Source: Cricinfo, 17 December 2011

William Randall (c. 1823 – 17 February 1877) was an English cricketer. Randall's batting style is unknown. He was educated at Eton College.

Randall made a single first-class appearance for Sussex against Surrey at the Petworth Park New Ground in 1849. In this match, Randall was run out for 3 runs in Sussex's first-innings. He wasn't required to bat again as Sussex recorded a victory by an innings and 49 runs.

He died at Northchapel, Sussex on 17 February 1877.
