= William Dummer (cricketer) =

English cricketer

Personal information
- Full name: William Dummer
- Born: 8 October 1847; Petworth, Sussex, England
- Died: 13 May 1922 (aged 74); Roffey, Sussex, England
- Batting: Right-handed
- Bowling: Right-arm fast

Domestic team information
- Years: Team
- 1869: Sussex
- FC debut: 7 June 1869 Sussex v Surrey
- Last FC: 24 June 1869 Sussex v Lancashire

Career statistics
Competition	First-class
Matches	3
Runs scored	60
Batting average	15.00
100s/50s	0/0
Top score	35*
Balls bowled	88
Wickets	0
Bowling average	–
5 wickets in innings	–
10 wickets in match	–
Best bowling	–
Catches/stumpings	3/–
- Source: CricketArchive, 8 December 2009

William Dummer (8 October 1847 – 13 May 1922) was an English cricketer who played three first-class matches for Sussex in 1869.

== Cricket career ==
Dummer was born in Petworth, West Sussex, the first son of William Dummer (1819–1877) and Eliza Boxall (1823–1900). He made his debut for Sussex against Surrey at the Kennington Oval on 7 June 1869, when he scored 35 not out in a first innings total of 253, followed by a duck in the second. With Harry Jupp leading the way with a total of 121, Surrey won the match by 6 wickets.

Dummer played in the next two matches for Sussex scoring a further 25 runs in defeats against Kent and Lancashire. Described as a round arm Right-arm fast bowler, Dummer failed to take a wicket in any of his three appearances for Sussex, all of which ended in defeat.

== Later life ==
He married Hannah, who was born c. 1850 at Gaginwell, near Chipping Norton, Oxfordshire. In 1881, they were living at Horsham, West Sussex, and Dummer was working as a carpenter.

In the 1901 census, Dummer was described as a Railway Signal Linerman living at Battersea, London, with Hannah and their two youngest children. In all he had four children, William (born Battersea 1874, died Horsham 1882), Charles (born Battersea 1876), Frederick (born New Cross 1877, died 1958) and Ernest (born Horsham 1879, died 1954).

== Death ==
Dummer died on 13 May 1922, and was buried in the cemetery of Roffey Parish Church, Horsham, where his widow joined him following her death on 30 March 1930. Other sources state that he died at Nichols Town, Southampton on 17 December 1909.
