= William Hall (cricketer, born 1853) =

English cricketer

Personal information
- Full name: William Fletcher Hall
- Born: 22 March 1853; Lindfield, Sussex, England
- Died: 1 November 1911 (aged 58); East Grinstead, Sussex, England
- Batting: Unknown
- Bowling: Unknown

Domestic team information
- Years: Team
- 1874: Sussex

Career statistics
Competition	First-class
Matches	1
Runs scored	19
Batting average	9.50
100s/50s	–/–
Top score	18
Balls bowled	100
Wickets	1
Bowling average	57.00
5 wickets in innings	–
10 wickets in match	–
Best bowling	1/57
Catches/stumpings	1/–
- Source: Cricinfo, 16 December 2011

William Fletcher Hall (22 March 1853 – 1 November 1911) was an English cricketer. Hall's batting and bowling styles are unknown. He was born at Lindfield, Sussex.

Hall made a single first-class appearance for Sussex against Gloucestershire at the County Ground, Hove in 1874. Hall took the wicket of Edward Knapp in Gloucestershire's first-innings, finishing with figures of 1/57 from 25 overs. In Sussex's first-innings, he was dismissed for a single run by Fred Grace. Having made 231 in response to Gloucestershire's 381, Sussex were forced to follow-on and in their second-innings he was dismissed for 18 by W. G. Grace, with his the final wicket to fall in Sussex's total of 148. Gloucestershire won by an innings and 2 runs. This was his only major appearance for Sussex.

He died at East Grinstead, Sussex on 1 November 1911.
