= Michael Chadwick (cricketer) =

English cricketer (born 1989)

Michael Steven Chadwick (born 24 May 1989 in Leeds) is an English cricketer active who has played in a first-class match in 2010 for Sussex as a righthanded batsman who bowls right arm medium-fast pace. He has scored no runs and has taken one wickets with a best performance of one for 41.
