= John Vidler =

English cricketer and prison governor

John Lionel Symonds Vidler OBE (30 March 1890 – 15 October 1967) was an English cricketer and prison governor.

Vidler was born in Rye, Sussex, and educated at Repton School and Oriel College, Oxford, where he won a blue for cricket and a half-blue for golf. He also played cricket for Sussex. He appeared in 29 first-class matches as a right-handed batsman who bowled right arm medium pace. He scored 682 runs with a highest score of 55 and took 81 wickets with a best performance of seven for 23.

After working as a tea planter in Ceylon and as a leather maker in Bermondsey, Vider joined the Prison Service. He was governor of Portland Prison 1936–44 and of Maidstone Prison 1944–55. He was appointed OBE in the 1956 New Year Honours. He died in Rye.
