= Gerald Sly =

English cricketer

Personal information
- Full name: Gerald Brian Sly
- Born: 21 October 1932; Ealing, Middlesex, England
- Died: 5 September 2012 (aged 79); Shrewsbury, Shropshire, England
- Batting: Right-handed
- Bowling: Right-arm fast-medium

Domestic team information
- Years: Team
- 1953: Sussex

Career statistics
Competition	First-class
Matches	1
Runs scored	–
Batting average	–
100s/50s	–/–
Top score	–
Balls bowled	99
Wickets	1
Bowling average	29.00
5 wickets in innings	–
10 wickets in match	–
Best bowling	1/24
Catches/stumpings	–/–
- Source: Cricinfo, 23 November 2011

Gerald Brian Sly (21 October 1932 – 5 September 2012) was an English cricketer. Sly was a right-handed batsman who bowled right-arm fast-medium. He was born at Ealing, Middlesex.

Sly made a single first-class appearance for Sussex against Oxford University at the County Ground, Hove in 1953. He didn't bat in this match, but did take the wicket of Colin Cowdrey in Oxford University's first-innings. The match ended in a draw. This was his only major appearance for Sussex.
