= Bob Stainton =

English cricketer, Royal Air Force officer, and school headmaster

Robert George Stainton (23 May 1910 – 15 August 2000) was an English cricketer, Royal Air Force officer, and school headmaster.

Stainton was born in Whitstable and educated at Malvern College and Brasenose College, Oxford, where he won Blues for both cricket and soccer. He also played cricket for Sussex, acting as captain in 1938. He appeared in 61 first-class matches as a right-handed batsman who bowled right-arm slow. He scored 2,330 runs with a highest score of 89 and took one wicket with a best performance of one for 12.

During World War II Stainton was a Royal Air Force navigator. On 5 July 1944 his Mosquito was shot up over France and limped back on one engine to RAF Ford in Sussex, where it crashed and Stainton was trapped in the cockpit, fearing that the aircraft would explode at any moment. Afterwards he wrote that the only thought in his mind was "at least I had my cricket".

On leaving Oxford in 1934 Stainton had become a schoolteacher; after the war he went back to teaching and became headmaster of Glengorse School, a preparatory school in Battle, East Sussex. He died in Hastings.
