= Bob Pountain =

English cricketer

Francis Reginald ("Bob") Pountain (23 April 1941 – 19 January 2007) was an English cricketer active from 1960 to 1965 who played for Sussex. He was born in Eastleigh, Hampshire and died in Brighton. He appeared in 76 first-class matches as a righthanded batsman who bowled right arm medium pace. He scored 1,920 runs with a highest score of 96 and took 86 wickets with a best performance of five for 91.
