= Thomas Shoubridge =

English cricketer

Thomas Shoubridge (8 September 1868 – 22 October 1937) was an English cricketer. He was a right-arm round-arm bowler who played for Sussex. He was born in Horsham and died in Prescot.

Shoubridge made his first-class debut, however, for Liverpool and District, bowling a total of eighteen overs in the match against Yorkshire, and taking the wicket of Lord Hawke in the second innings.

While the inaugural 1890 County Championship season was well underway, Shoubridge had to wait until June before he stepped up to make his two first-class appearances—the first of which saw opponents Lancashire win by an innings margin. The second match was equally unsuccessful, with opponents Kent matching Lancashire's feat. This was to be Shoubridge's final match in the County Championship, and he would make just one further cricketing appearance, for Lancashire's Second XI.
