= William Gilbert (cricketer) =

English cricketer

Personal information
- Full name: William Gilbert
- Born: 4 June 1856; Newick, Sussex, England
- Died: 4 January 1918 (aged 61); Holborn, London, England
- Batting: Right-handed
- Bowling: Right-arm roundarm fast

Domestic team information
- Years: Team
- 1879: Sussex

Career statistics
Competition	First-class
Matches	1
Runs scored	5
Batting average	2.50
100s/50s	–/–
Top score	5
Balls bowled	92
Wickets	3
Bowling average	4.66
5 wickets in innings	–
10 wickets in match	–
Best bowling	3/14
Catches/stumpings	1/–
- Source: Cricinfo, 16 December 2011

William Gilbert (4 June 1856 – 4 January 1918) was an English cricketer. Gilbert was a right-handed batsman who bowled right-arm roundarm fast. He was born at Newick, Sussex.

Gilbert made a single first-class appearance for Sussex against the Marylebone Cricket Club at Lord's in 1879. He was run out for 5 runs in Sussex's first-innings, while in the Marylebone Cricket Club's first-innings he took the wickets of Wilfred Flowers, William Kenyon-Slaney and Arnold Rylott, with Gilbert taking 3/14 from 23 overs. He was dismissed for a duck by Rylott in Sussex's second-innings, with Sussex being bowled out for just 38 to lose the match by an innings and 74 runs. This was his only major appearance for Sussex.

He died at Holborn, London on 4 January 1918.
