= Thomas Brown (cricketer, born 1854) =

English cricketer

Thomas Brown (25 March 1854 – 26 April 1936) was an English cricketer. He was a right-handed batsman and a right-arm round-arm medium-fast bowler who played for Sussex. He was born in Ampthill and died in Isleworth.

Brown first appeared for his home county of Bedfordshire in a miscellaneous match in 1882. Brown played eight years later for Sussex in the County Championship, making his debut against Yorkshire. Despite playing lower in the order, he performed well, hitting his best first-class score in just his second first-class innings.

In spite of Brown's early good form, he, along with the rest of the team, crumbled in a game against Lancashire in which Sussex made 35 all out and 24 all out in a heavy innings defeat – the latter of which remains one of the lowest totals in the club's first-class history.

Brown played in two more County Championship matches in the 1890 season, both of which finished in innings defeats for the side. Following his retirement from playing the game, Brown later umpired two matches in the 1901 Minor Counties Championship season.
