= Cecil Butcher =

English cricketer

Personal information
- Full name: Cecil Frank Butcher
- Born: 31 October 1872; Brighton, Sussex, England
- Died: 22 March 1929 (aged 56); Portslade, Sussex, England
- Batting: Right-handed
- Bowling: Right-arm fast-medium

Domestic team information
- Years: Team
- 1894–1896: Sussex

Career statistics
Competition	First-class
Matches	6
Runs scored	36
Batting average	3.00
100s/50s	–/–
Top score	13
Balls bowled	715
Wickets	9
Bowling average	39.44
5 wickets in innings	–
10 wickets in match	–
Best bowling	3/107
Catches/stumpings	1/–
- Source: Cricinfo, 26 February 2012

Cecil Frank Butcher (31 October 1872 – 22 March 1929) was an English cricketer. Butcher was a right-handed batsman who bowled right-arm fast-medium. He was born at Brighton, Sussex.

Butcher made his first-class debut for Sussex against Kent in 1894 County Championship at the County Ground, Hove. He made five further first-class appearances for Sussex, the last of which came against Lancashire in 1896 County Championship. Smith's role in a team was a bowler, in his six first-class matches for Sussex he took 9 wickets at an average of 39.44, with best figures of 3/107. With the bat, he scored 36 runs at an average of 3.00, with a high score of 13.

He died at Portslade, Sussex, on 22 March 1929.
