= Edwin Lulham =

English cricketer

Edwin Lulham (7 April 1865 – 27 June 1940) was an English cricketer who played first-class cricket for Sussex. He was born in Norwich and died in Hurstpierpoint.

Lulham made just one appearance for the team, against Yorkshire in 1894. Batting in the lower order, he scored just one run in the first innings and five in the second – however he was more successful with the ball, picking up the only three wickets in the innings that Walter Humphreys failed to.

Alas this defeat was made worse by the fact that two of Sussex's players were absent hurt, including former Test man George Bean, who retired hurt in the first innings of the match.
