= William Mason (cricketer) =

English cricketer

Personal information
- Full name: William Hayley Mason
- Born: 18 April 1811; Chichester, Sussex, England
- Died: 24 January 1865 (aged 53); Chichester, Sussex, England
- Batting: Unknown

Domestic team information
- Years: Team
- 1841–1842: Sussex
- 1834–1838: Sussex

Career statistics
Competition	First-class
Matches	11
Runs scored	127
Batting average	6.04
100s/50s	0/0
Top score	38
Catches/stumpings	1/–
- Source: Cricinfo, 26 February 2012

William Hayley Mason (18 April 1811 – 24 January 1865) was an English cricketer. Mason's batting style is unknown. He was born at Chichester, Sussex.

Mason made his first-class debut for Sussex against England in 1834 at the Royal New Ground, Brighton. Mason made five first-class appearances for Sussex prior to the formation of Sussex County Cricket Club in August 1839. Mason first appeared for Sussex County Cricket Club against Kent in 1841, with him making four further first-class appearances for the County Cricket Club, with his final appearance coming against Kent. In total, Mason played eleven first-class matches for Sussex, before and after the formation of the county club, scoring 127 runs at an average of 6.04, with a high score of 38.

He died at the city of his birth on 24 January 1865.
