= Timothy Curtis =

English cricketer

Timothy Herbert William Curtis (3 August 1882 – 11 June 1966) was an English cricketer who played for Sussex. He was born in Folkestone, Kent and died in Little Waltham, Essex.

== Cricket ==
Curtis made a single first-class appearance for the team, in 1912, against Warwickshire. From the middle order, he scored 2 runs in the first innings in which he batted and a single run in the second.

== Personal life ==
Curtis was commissioned a Second lieutenant in the 4th (Militia) Battalion of the East Surrey Regiment on 23 May 1902. He was in South Africa with this battalion during the latter stages of the Second Boer War, and returned home on the SS Targus in October 1902.
