= Timothy Head =

English cricketer

Tim Head
Personal information
- Full name: Timothy John Head
- Born: 22 September 1957 (age 69); Hammersmith, London, England
- Nickname: Heady
- Batting: Right-handed
- Role: Wicket-keeper
- Relatives: Sophie Collier (m. 2003), Katy Head (b. 2003), Daniel Head (b. 2005)

Domestic team information
- Years: Team
- 1986: Cambridge University
- 1976–1981: Sussex

Career statistics
Competition	First-class	List A
Matches	25	9
Runs scored	397	50
Batting average	16.54	10.00
100s/50s	–/1	–/–
Top score	52*	24
Balls bowled
Wickets
Bowling average
5 wickets in innings
10 wickets in match
Best bowling
Catches/stumpings	55/6	7/2
- Source: Cricinfo, 13 March 2012

Timothy John Head (born 22 September 1957, Hammersmith, London, England) is a former English cricketer. Head was a right-handed batsman who fielded as a wicket-keeper.

Head made his first-class debut for Sussex against Oxford University in 1976. He made 21 further first-class appearances for the county, the last of which came against the touring Australians in 1981. In his 22 first-class matches for Sussex, he scored a total of 335 runs at an average of 16.75, with a high score of 52 not out. Behind the stumps he took 54 catches and made 6 stumpings. This score was his only first-class half century and came against the Australians in 1981. Head made his debut in List A cricket for the county in 1978, against Middlesex in the John Player League. He made eight further List A appearances for the county, the last of which came against Glamorgan in the 1980 John Player League. In his nine List A appearances, he scored a total of 50 runs at an average of 10.00, with a high score of 24. Behind the stumps he took 7 catches and made 2 stumpings.

He later studied at the University of Cambridge, making three first-class appearances while there for Cambridge University Cricket Club in 1986, against Leicestershire, Essex and Sussex. He scored 62 runs in these three matches, which came at an average of 15.50, with a high score of 40 not out.
