= Reginald Medhurst =

English cricketer

Reginald Frank Medhurst aka Robert Henry Medhurst (dates uncertain) was an English cricketer active from 1948 to 1951 who played in three first-class matches for Sussex in 1948 and then made a single appearance in minor counties cricket for Lincolnshire in 1951.

There is confusion in sources about Medhurst's full name and his birth and death details. According to CricketArchive, his forenames were Reginald Frank and he was born in Lewes sometime in 1920 and died in Brighton on an unspecified date in December 2009. The CricInfo site has different information, calling him Robert Henry and giving his date and place of birth as 29 April 1922 in Sydenham with no date of death. His death was announced in the Daily Telegraph at Lewisham Hospital on 23 September 2013. In other sources, he is barely mentioned except as R. Medhurst of Sussex.

What is certain, as both online sources agree, is that he appeared in three first-class matches as a righthanded batsman who bowled right arm fast medium, scoring 17 runs with a highest score of 15 not out and took three wickets with a best performance of one for 11.
