= Alan Wadey =

English cricketer

Personal information
- Full name: Alan Nigel Charles Wadey
- Born: 12 September 1950 (age 76); Billingshurst, Sussex, England
- Batting: Right-handed
- Bowling: Right-arm medium

Domestic team information
- Years: Team
- 1975: Sussex

Career statistics
Competition	First-class
Matches	1
Runs scored	0
Batting average	–
100s/50s	–/–
Top score	0*
Balls bowled	48
Wickets	1
Bowling average	44.00
5 wickets in innings	–
10 wickets in match	–
Best bowling	1/44
Catches/stumpings	–/–
- Source: Cricinfo, 23 November 2011

Alan Nigel Charles Wadey (born 12 September 1950) is a former English cricketer. Wadey was a right-handed batsman who bowled right-arm medium pace. He was born at Billingshurst, Sussex.

Wadey made a single first-class appearance for Sussex against Yorkshire at the County Ground, Hove in the 1975 County Championship. Wadey batted twice in this match, ending unbeaten without scoring in each innings. With the ball he took a single wicket, that of Richard Lumb for the cost of 44 runs from 8 overs. Yorkshire won by 2 wickets. This was his only major appearance for Sussex.
