= Alan Murdoch-Cozens =

English cricketer

Alan James Murdoch-Cozens (formerly Alan James Murdoch; 17 September 1893 – 23 July 1970) was an English cricketer active from 1911 to 1919 who played for Sussex. He was born in Wallingford, Oxfordshire and died in Malvern, Worcestershire. He appeared in four first-class matches as a righthanded batsman who scored 124 runs with a highest score of 56.
