= Frank Quaife =

English cricketer

Personal information
- Full name: Frank Cyril Quaife
- Born: 5 April 1905; Hastings, Sussex, England
- Died: 27 August 1968 (aged 63); Eastbourne, Sussex, England
- Batting: Left-handed
- Bowling: Slow left-arm orthodox

Domestic team information
- Years: Team
- 1928: Sussex

Career statistics
Competition	First-class
Matches	2
Runs scored	0
Batting average	0.00
100s/50s	–/–
Top score	0
Balls bowled	95
Wickets	1
Bowling average	47.00
5 wickets in innings	–
10 wickets in match	–
Best bowling	1/19
Catches/stumpings	–/–
- Source: Cricinfo, 26 November 2011

Frank Cyril Quaife (5 April 1905 – 27 August 1968) was an English cricketer. Quaife was a left-handed batsman who bowled slow left-arm orthodox. He was born at Hastings, Sussex.

Quaife made two first-class appearances for Sussex against Yorkshire and Surrey in the 1928 County Championship. He didn't score any runs in these two matches, while his only wicket was that of Yorkshire opening batsman Percy Holmes. He later stood as an umpire in one first-class match between DR Jardine's XI and Oxford University in 1955.

He died at Eastbourne, Sussex on 27 August 1968.
