= William Mercer (cricketer) =

English cricketer

William Norman Mercer (30 May 1922 – 11 April 1989) was an English cricketer active from 1942 to 1956 who played for Sussex. He was born in Prescot, Lancashire and died in Brighton. He appeared in three first-class matches as a righthanded batsman who bowled leg break and googly. He scored 40 runs with a highest score of 24 and took six wickets with a best performance of three for 31.
