= William O'Byrne =

English cricketer

Personal information
- Full name: William Francis Thomas O'Byrne
- Born: 30 April 1908; Bromley, Kent, England
- Died: 23 October 1951 (aged 43); St Leonards-on-Sea, Sussex, England
- Batting: Right-handed

Domestic team information
- Years: Team
- 1935: Sussex

Career statistics
Competition	First-class
Matches	1
Runs scored	34
Batting average	17.00
100s/50s	–/–
Top score	26
Balls bowled	–
Wickets	–
Bowling average	–
5 wickets in innings	–
10 wickets in match	–
Best bowling	–
Catches/stumpings	1/–
- Source: Cricinfo, 27 November 2011

William Francis Thomas O'Byrne (30 April 1908 – 23 October 1951) was an English cricketer. O'Byrne was a right-handed batsman. He was born at Bromley, Kent.

O'Byrne made a single first-class appearance for Sussex against Cambridge University at the County Ground, Hove in 1935. In Sussex's first-innings, he was dismissed for 8 runs by James Cameron. In their second-innings, he was dismissed for 26 runs by the same bowler. This was his only major appearance for Sussex.

He died at St Leonards-on-Sea, Sussex on 23 October 1951.
