= David Standing =

English cricketer

Personal information
- Full name: David Kevin Standing
- Born: 21 October 1963 (age 63); Brighton, Sussex, England
- Batting: Right-handed
- Bowling: Right-arm off break

Domestic team information
- Years: Team
- 1983–1988: Sussex

Career statistics
| Competition | First-class | List A |
|---|---|---|
| Matches | 43 | 21 |
| Runs scored | 1,130 | 71 |
| Batting average | 18.83 | 17.75 |
| 100s/50s | –/5 | –/– |
| Top score | 65 | 42* |
| Balls bowled | 1,385 | 594 |
| Wickets | 6 | 16 |
| Bowling average | 120.83 | 28.81 |
| 5 wickets in innings | – | – |
| 10 wickets in match | – | – |
| Best bowling | 2/28 | 3/28 |
| Catches/stumpings | 17/– | 7/– |
- Source: Cricinfo, 12 March 2012

David Kevin Standing (born 21 October 1963) is an English former cricketer. Standing was a right-handed batsman who bowled right-arm off break. He was born at Brighton, Sussex.

Standing made his first-class debut for Sussex against Middlesex in the 1983 County Championship. He made 42 further first-class appearances for the county, the last of which came against Middlesex in the 1988 County Championship. In his 43 first-class matches for Sussex, he scored a total of 1,130 runs at an average of 18.83, with a high score of 65. One of five first-class half centuries he made, this score came against Warwickshire in 1986. With the ball, he took just 6 wickets at an expensive bowling average of 120.83, with best figures of 2/28.

Standing didn't make his debut in List A cricket for the county until 1985, when he featured against the touring Zimbabweans. He made twenty further List A appearances for the county, the last of which came against Derbyshire in the 1988 NatWest Trophy. In his 21 List A appearances, he scored a total of 71 runs at an average of 17.75, with a high score of 42 not out. With the ball, he took 16 wickets at an average of 28.81, with best figures of 3/28.
