= Joseph Bean =

English cricketer

Joseph Bean (16 February 1876 – 12 January 1922) was an English cricketer active from 1895 to 1903 who played for Sussex. He was born and died in Sutton-in-Ashfield. He appeared in 40 first-class matches, scoring 453 runs with a highest score of 46 and taking 35 wickets with a best performance of five for 34.
