= Robert Miller (cricketer) =

English cricketer

Robert Alexander Tamplin Miller (12 November 1895 – 10 July 1941) was an English cricketer active in 1919 who played for Sussex. He was born in Travancore and died in Yemen. He appeared in twelve first-class matches as a righthanded batsman who kept wicket. He scored 191 runs with a highest score of 39 and completed nine catches with 11 stumpings.
