= Thomas Raynes =

English cricketer

Personal information
- Full name: Thomas Arthur Raynes
- Born: 18 July 1838; Ripe, Sussex, England
- Died: 6 March 1914 (aged 75); Cockington, Devon, England
- Batting: Right-handed

Domestic team information
- Years: Team
- 1854–1864: Sussex

Career statistics
Competition	First-class
Matches	10
Runs scored	207
Batting average	12.17
100s/50s	–/–
Top score	39
Balls bowled	–
Wickets	–
Bowling average	–
5 wickets in innings	–
10 wickets in match	–
Best bowling	–
Catches/stumpings	5/–
- Source: Cricinfo, 30 June 2012

Thomas Arthur Raynes (18 July 1835 – 6 March 1914) was an English cricketer. Raynes was a right-handed batsman. He was born at Ripe, Sussex.

Raynes made his first-class debut for Sussex against an All England Eleven in 1854 at The Dripping Pan, Lewes. He next appeared in first-class cricket in 1856, playing for the Gentlemen of Surrey and Sussex against the Gentlemen of England at Lord's, while in 1859 he played for Gentlemen of the South against the Gentlemen of the North at The Oval. His second first-class appearance for Sussex came in 1861 against the Marylebone Cricket Club. He made five further first-class appearances for the county, the last of which came against Middlesex in 1864 at the Royal Brunswick Ground, Hove. He also made a single first-class appearance for the Surrey Club in 1862 against Middlesex. In his total of seven first-class matches for Sussex, Raynes scored 69 runs at an average of 6.27, with a high score of 15. In total, he scored 207 runs in his ten first-class matches, at an average of 12.17 and with a high score of 39.

He died at Cockington, Devon, on 6 March 1914.
