= Tom Mayes =

English cricketer

Personal information
- Full name: Thomas William Mayes
- Born: 1859; Whitby, Yorkshire, England
- Died: March 1931 (aged 71/72); Pontypool, Monmouthshire, Wales
- Batting: Unknown
- Role: Wicket-keeper

Domestic team information
- Years: Team
- 1897–1904: Monmouthshire
- 1889: Sussex

Career statistics
Competition	First-class
Matches	7
Runs scored	51
Batting average	5.66
100s/50s	–/–
Top score	15
Balls bowled	20
Wickets	–
Bowling average	–
5 wickets in innings	–
10 wickets in match	–
Best bowling	–
Catches/stumpings	11/3
- Source: Cricinfo, 28 November 2011

Thomas William Mayes (1859 – March 1931) was an English cricketer. Mayes' batting style is unknown, but it is known he fielded as a wicket-keeper.

Mayes made his first-class debut for Sussex against Gloucestershire at the County Ground, Hove in 1889. During that season he made six further first-class appearances for the county, the last of which came against Lancashire. In his seven first-class matches, he scored a total of 51 runs at an average of 5.66, with a high score of 15, while behind the stumps he took 11 catches and made 3 stumpings.

He later played for Monmouthshire, making his debut for the county in the 1897 Minor Counties Championship against Glamorgan. He made 26 further appearances for Monmouthshire, the last of which came in the 1904 Minor Counties Championship against Berkshire. He died sometime in March 1931, at Pontypool, Monmouthshire.
