= Charles Etheridge =

English cricketer

Charles Etheridge (5 July 1870 – 14 February 1948) was an English cricketer. He was a left-arm slow bowler who played first-class cricket for Sussex. He was born and died in Horsham.

Etheridge made his first two first-class appearances in August 1896, with his debut County Championship match against Lancashire coming less than a week after he appeared for Sussex against a team of Australians. Etheridge, a number 11 batsman, batted in just his first innings as the match was drawn.

For the five years in between this and his final first-class match, Etheridge made yearly appearances for Sussex's Second XI in matches against Kent. His final County Championship match came in 1901, though he scored just one run in the match.

Etheridge was a tailender during the County Championship games in which he played.
