= Samuel Jagger =

Welsh cricketer

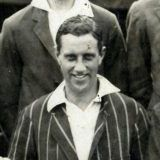
- Samuel Jagger, Wesh Cygnets, 1927

Personal information
- Full name: Samuel Thornton Jagger
- Born: 30 June 1904; Llangollen, Denbighshire, Wales
- Died: 30 May 1964 (aged 59); Hove, Sussex, England
- Batting: Right-handed
- Bowling: Right arm medium

Domestic team information
- Years: Team
- 1922—1923: Worcestershire
- 1923—1926: Cambridge University
- 1927—1929: Wales
- 1931: Sussex

Career statistics
Competition	First-class
Matches	44
Runs scored	599
Batting average	11.30
100s/50s	0/1
Top score	58
Balls bowled	5,773
Wickets	90
Bowling average	33.43
5 wickets in innings	4
10 wickets in match	0
Best bowling	5/24
Catches/stumpings	38/–
- Source: , 10 July 2008

Samuel Thornton Jagger (30 June 1904 – 30 May 1964) was a Welsh first-class cricketer who played on more than 40 occasions between the wars. He was later to work as a housemaster at Lancing College.

Educated at Malvern College, he captained the cricket eleven in both 1921 and 1922. His first-class debut came for Worcestershire against Somerset at Weston-super-Mare in August 1922. In a drawn match, Jagger took three first-innings wickets. He also played for Worcestershire, as well as Cambridge University, the following season, but it was then discovered that his county qualification was invalid. During 1923, he made his only first-class half-century when he hit 58 for Cambridge against Essex.

Jagger played no first-class cricket in 1924, but in the two years thereafter he appeared regularly for Cambridge and won his Blue. In early May 1925, he claimed his first five-wicket haul when he took 5–40 against Sussex at Fenner's. He also claimed five-wicket bags for Cambridge that season against Free Foresters (taking nine in the match) and Surrey, the three bowling feats coming within a space of six weeks. He ended 1925 with 41 first-class wickets (his highest season's aggregate) at 32.21. The following year he picked up another 24 wickets, and achieved a career-best 5–24 against Yorkshire

From 1927 and 1929, Jagger turned out for Wales, at that point playing a small number of first-class games each year, and played in the side's eight-wicket win over the touring West Indians. The game was dominated by 55-year-old Sydney Barnes' 12 wickets, and the wicketless Jagger's personal contribution was limited to a first-innings 30. Jagger played a little minor counties cricket for Denbighshire in 1930, but in 1931 returned for his final fling at first-class level, appearing three times without conspicuous success for Sussex.
