= Daniel Geere =

English cricketer

Personal information
- Full name: Daniel Dioneys Geere
- Born: 1814; Stoke Poges, Buckinghamshire, England
- Died: 1868 (aged 53–54); Lewes district, Sussex, England
- Batting: Unknown

Domestic team information
- Years: Team
- 1840: Sussex

Career statistics
Competition	First-class
Matches	2
Runs scored	5
Batting average	2.50
100s/50s	–/–
Top score	3*
Balls bowled	–
Wickets	–
Bowling average	–
5 wickets in innings	–
10 wickets in match	–
Best bowling	–
Catches/stumpings	2/–
- Source: Cricinfo, 19 December 2011

Daniel Dioneys Geere (1814 – 1868) was an English cricketer. Geere's batting style is unknown. He was born at Stoke Poges, Buckinghamshire.

Geere made two first-class appearances for Sussex in 1840, both against Nottinghamshire. In the first match at the Royal New Ground, Brighton, Geere was dismissed for 2 runs in Sussex's innings of 225 by Thomas Barker. Nottinghamshire were dismissed for 104 in response and were forced to follow-on, making just 62 in their second-innings to give Sussex an innings and 59 run victory. In the return match at Trent Bridge, Sussex made 115 in their first-innings, with Geere being dismissed for a duck by Barker. Nottinghamshire made 85 in their first-innings, while Sussex could only manage to make 73 in their second-innings, with Geere ending the innings not out on 3. Nottinghamshire's target in their second-innings was 104, but they could only make 89 to hand Sussex a 14 run victory.

His death was registered at Lewes in Sussex in the third quarter of 1868, with stated age being 53. His second name is spelled as "Diones" on the certificate.
