= Henry Munnion =

English cricketer

Personal information
- Full name: Henry Munnion
- Born: 21 January 1849; Ardingly, Sussex, England
- Died: 24 June 1904 (aged 55); Ardingly, Sussex, England
- Batting: Right-handed
- Bowling: Left-arm medium

Domestic team information
- Years: Team
- 1877–1880: Sussex

Career statistics
Competition	First-class
Matches	2
Runs scored	0
Batting average	0.00
100s/50s	–/–
Top score	0
Balls bowled	87
Wickets	2
Bowling average	14.00
5 wickets in innings	–
10 wickets in match	–
Best bowling	2/15
Catches/stumpings	1/–
- Source: Cricinfo, 16 December 2011

Henry Munnion (21 January 1849 – 24 June 1904) was an English cricketer. Munnion was a right-handed batsman who bowled left-arm medium pace. He was born at Ardingly, Sussex.

Munnion made two first-class appearances for Sussex, one in 1877 against Gloucestershire at Clifton College Close Ground and another in 1880 against the touring Australians at the County Ground, Hove. Against Gloucestershire, Munnion was dismissed for a duck in Sussex's first-innings by W.G. Grace, with the same outcome in Sussex's second-innings. Gloucestershire won the match by 8 wickets. Against the Australians, he was dismissed for a duck in Sussex's first-innings by George Palmer, while in the Australians first-innings he took the wickets of Affie Jarvis and Palmer, finishing with figures of 2/15 from 17.3 overs. In Sussex's second-innings, Munnion wasn't required to bat, with the match ending in a draw.

He died at the village of his birth on 24 June 1904.
