= Justin Bates =

English cricketer

Personal information
- Full name: Justin Jonathan Bates
- Born: 9 April 1976 (age 50); Farnborough, Kent, England
- Batting: Right-handed
- Bowling: Right-arm off break

Domestic team information
- Years: Team
- 1998: Sussex Cricket Board
- 1996–2000: Sussex

Career statistics
Competition	First-class	List A
Matches	21	8
Runs scored	411	47
Batting average	13.70	9.40
100s/50s	–/1	–/–
Top score	57	25*
Balls bowled	3,583	224
Wickets	49	3
Bowling average	31.18	77.00
5 wickets in innings	4	–
10 wickets in match	–	–
Best bowling	5/67	2/42
Catches/stumpings	17/–	4/–
- Source: Cricinfo, 6 September 2011

Justin Jonathon Bates (born 9 April 1976) is a former English cricketer. Bates was a right-handed batsman who bowled right-arm off break. He was born in Farnborough, Hampshire.

Bates made his debut for Sussex in a List A match in the 1996 AXA Equity and Law League against Essex. The following season, he made his first-class debut for the county against Oxford University. He made twenty further first-class appearances for Sussex, the last of which came against Northamptonshire in the 2000 County Championship. In his twenty first-class matches, he scored 411 runs at an average of 13.70, with a high score of 57. This score, which was his only first-class fifty, came against Hampshire in 1999. With the ball, he took 49 wickets at a bowling average of 31.18, with best figures of 5/67. These figures, one of four five wicket hauls he took, came against Northamptonshire in 1998. Having made his List A debut in 1996, Bates would go on to make just seven further appearances in that format, the last of which came against Sri Lanka A in 1999. In his eight List A matches, he scored 47 runs at an average of 9.40, with a high score of 25 not out. With the ball, he took 3 wickets which came at an expensive average of 77.00, with best figures of 2/42.

With him featuring on an infrequent basis for Sussex, Bates also played for the Sussex Second XI, as well as for the Sussex Cricket Board in the 1998 MCCA Knockout Trophy. He left Sussex at the end of the 2000 season.
