= Arthur Lawrence =

English cricketer (1930–2020)

Personal information
- Full name: Arthur Alfred Kenneth Lawrence
- Born: 3 November 1930; Marlborough, Wiltshire, England
- Died: 17 December 2020 (aged 90)
- Height: 5 ft 4 in (1.63 m)
- Batting: Right-handed
- Bowling: Leg break

Domestic team information
- Years: Team
- 1952–1956: Sussex

Career statistics
Competition	First-class
Matches	28
Runs scored	632
Batting average	17.08
100s/50s	–/3
Top score	63*
Balls bowled	44
Wickets	1
Bowling average	40.00
5 wickets in innings	–
10 wickets in match	–
Best bowling	1/14
Catches/stumpings	28/–
- Source: Cricinfo, 15 January 2012

Arthur Alfred Kenneth Lawrence (3 November 1930 – 17 December 2020) was an English cricketer. Lawrence was a right-handed batsman who bowled leg break. He was born at Marlborough, Wiltshire.

Lawrence made his first-class debut for Sussex against Oxford University in 1954, with him playing a second match that season against Leicestershire in the County Championship. He next appeared for Sussex in 1954, making 26 further first-class appearances between 1954 and 1956, with his final first-class appearance coming against Northamptonshire in the 1956 County Championship. In total, Lawrence made 28 first-class appearances for Sussex, scoring 632 runs at an average of 17.08, with a high score of 63 not out. This score was one of three fifties he made and came against Oxford University in 1955, in a match in which he also recorded another half century score of 62. He took a single wicket during his first-class career.

Lawrence died on 17 December 2020, at the age of 90.
