= Robert Wooller =

English cricketer

Robert Wooller (christened 13 February 1817) was an English cricketer who played for Sussex. He was born in Chalvington.

Wooller made a single first-class appearance for the team, against Marylebone Cricket Club in 1850. Wooler scored a duck in the first innings, batting as a tailender, and moved up to the opening order in the second innings, where he scored 2 runs alongside James Dean, who carried his bat until the end of the innings.
