= Stuart Still =

English cricketer (born 1957)

Personal information
- Full name: Stuart John Still
- Born: 14 December 1957 (age 68); Hove, Sussex, England
- Batting: Right-handed
- Bowling: Right-arm medium

Domestic team information
- Years: Team
- 1975: Sussex

Career statistics
Competition	First-class
Matches	1
Runs scored	6
Batting average	3.00
100s/50s	–/–
Top score	6
Balls bowled	60
Wickets	1
Bowling average	42.00
5 wickets in innings	–
10 wickets in match	–
Best bowling	1/42
Catches/stumpings	–/–
- Source: Cricinfo, 23 November 2011

Stuart John Still (born 14 December 1957) is a former English cricketer. Still was a right-handed batsman who bowled right-arm medium pace. He was born at Hove, Sussex.

Still played three Youth Test matches for England Young Cricketers against the touring West Indies Young Cricketers in 1974. The following season he made his only first-class appearance for Sussex against Nottinghamshire at Trent Bridge. In this match, Still was dismissed for a duck in Sussex's first-innings by Harry Latchman, while in their second-innings he scored 6 runs, before being dismissed by Bob White. With the ball he took a single wicket, that of Michael Smedley for the cost of 42 runs from 10 overs. Nottinghamshire won by an innings and 15 runs. This was his only major appearance for Sussex.
