= Alfred Tuppin =

English cricketer

Personal information
- Full name: Alfred George Tuppin
- Born: 17 December 1911; Brighton, Sussex, England
- Died: 20 July 2003 (aged 91); Haywards Heath, Sussex, England
- Batting: Right-handed
- Bowling: Right-arm medium

Domestic team information
- Years: Team
- 1935–1939: Sussex

Career statistics
Competition	First-class
Matches	23
Runs scored	294
Batting average	11.76
100s/50s	–/–
Top score	31*
Balls bowled	3,497
Wickets	56
Bowling average	29.03
5 wickets in innings	4
10 wickets in match	–
Best bowling	5/30
Catches/stumpings	11/–
- Source: Cricinfo, 22 June 2012

Alfred George Tuppin (17 December 1911 – 20 July 2003) was an English cricketer. Tuppin was a right-handed batsman who bowled right-arm medium pace. He was born at Brighton, Sussex.

Tuppin made his first-class debut for Sussex against Lancashire in the 1935 County Championship at the County Ground, Hove. He made 22 further first-class appearances for the county, the last of which came against Nottinghamshire in the 1939 County Championship. Tuppin's role within the Sussex team was a bowler, with him 56 wickets in his nine first-class matches, at an average of 29.03, with best figures of 5/30. He took four five wicket hauls, with his best figures coming against Worcestershire in 1937. With the bat, he scored 294 runs at a batting average of 11.76, with a high score of 31 not out.

He died at Haywards Heath, Sussex, on 20 July 2003.
