= Alfred Seal =

English cricketer (1875–1961)

Personal information
- Born: 10 August 1875; Millbrook, Hampshire, England
- Died: 13 February 1961 (aged 85); Chailey, Sussex, England
- Batting: Unknown
- Bowling: Unknown

Domestic team information
- Years: Team
- 1904: Sussex

Career statistics
Competition	First-class
Matches	2
Runs scored	0
Batting average	0.00
100s/50s	–/–
Top score	0
Balls bowled	30
Wickets	–
Bowling average	–
5 wickets in innings	–
10 wickets in match	–
Best bowling	–
Catches/stumpings	1/–
- Source: Cricinfo, 15 December 2011

Alfred Seal (10 August 1875 – 13 February 1961) was an English cricketer. Seal's batting and bowling styles are unknown. He was born at Millbrook, Hampshire.

Seal made two first-class appearances for Sussex in the 1904 County Championship against Leicestershire and Nottinghamshire. Against Leicestershire at Aylestone Road, Leicester, Seal wasn't required to bat or bowl, with the match petering out into a draw. In the following match against Nottinghamshire at Trent Bridge, Seal was run out for a duck in Sussex's first-innings, while in their second-innings he was dismissed for the same score by John Gunn. He also bowled five wicketless overs in the match, with Nottinghamshire winning by 226 runs.

He died at Chailey, Sussex on 13 February 1961.
