= Arthur Hobgen =

English cricketer

Personal information
- Born: 3 September 1849; Sidlesham, Sussex, England
- Died: 26 March 1886 (aged 36); Apuldram, Sussex, England
- Batting: Left-handed
- Bowling: Right-arm roundarm slow

Domestic team information
- Years: Team
- 1872–1873: Sussex

Career statistics
Competition	First-class
Matches	3
Runs scored	31
Batting average	7.75
100s/50s	–/–
Top score	12
Balls bowled	44
Wickets	2
Bowling average	12.50
5 wickets in innings	–
10 wickets in match	–
Best bowling	2/22
Catches/stumpings	1/–
- Source: Cricinfo, 13 March 2012

Arthur Hobgen (3 September 1849 – 26 March 1886) was an English cricketer. Hobgen was a left-handed batsman who bowled right-arm roundarm slow. He was born at Sidlesham, Sussex.

Hobgen made his first-class debut for Sussex against Gloucestershire in 1872. He made two further first-class appearances for the county, against Gloucestershire and Yorkshire in 1873. In his three first-class matches for Sussex, he scored a total of 31 runs at an average of 7.75, with a high score of 12. With the ball, he took 2 wickets at a bowling average of 12.50, with best figures of 2/22.

Hobgen and his Sussex teammate James Lillywhite organised the English tour of Australia in 1876-77 that later came to be recognised as the first Test tour. Hobgen provided financial support, and Lillywhite captained the team.

Hobgen worked in Chichester as a farmer, auctioneer and surveyor, and was a junior partner in the family auctioneering firm. He married Fanny Neale in June 1878. He died at Apuldram, Sussex, on 26 March 1886, and Fanny died in December 1886.
