= Don Jenner =

English cricketer

Personal information
- Full name: Felix Donovan Jenner
- Born: 15 November 1892; Hastings, Sussex, England
- Died: 31 March 1953 (aged 60); Hampstead, London, England
- Batting: Right-handed
- Bowling: Right-arm medium Right-arm off break

Domestic team information
- Years: Team
- 1924: Durham
- 1919–1921: Sussex

Career statistics
Competition	First-class
Matches	28
Runs scored	595
Batting average	12.14
100s/50s	–/1
Top score	55
Balls bowled	126
Wickets	2
Bowling average	33.00
5 wickets in innings	–
10 wickets in match	–
Best bowling	2/34
Catches/stumpings	9/–
- Source: Cricinfo, 1 January 2012

Felix Donovan "'Don" Jenner (15 November 1892 – 31 March 1953) was an English cricketer. Jenner was a right-handed batsman who bowled both right-arm medium pace and right-arm off break. He was born at Hastings, Sussex.

Jenner made his first-class debut for Sussex County against Nottinghamshire in the 1919 County Championship. He made 27 further first-class appearances for Sussex, the last of which came against Hampshire in the 1921 County Championship.

He had modest success during his first-class career, scoring a total of 595 runs at an average of 12.14, with a high score of 55. This was his only first-class half century and came against Glamorgan in 1921, in a match which was Glamorgan's first win since they acquired first-class status earlier in that season. He wasn't retained by Sussex beyond the 1921 season. He later moved to the north of England, playing for Durham twice in the 1924 Minor Counties Championship against the Yorkshire Second XI and the Lancashire Second XI.

Harrison died at Hampstead, London on 31 March 1953.
