= Richard Smyth (cricketer, born 1950) =

English cricketer

Personal information
- Full name: Richard Nicholas Paul Smyth
- Born: 27 June 1950 (age 76); Chichester, Sussex, England
- Batting: Right-handed

Domestic team information
- Years: Team
- 1970: Sussex

Career statistics
Competition	First-class	List A
Matches	3	1
Runs scored	42	4
Batting average	8.40	–
100s/50s	0/0	0/0
Top score	25	4*
Catches/stumpings	0/–	0/–
- Source: Cricinfo, 31 December 2011

Richard Nicholas Paul Smyth (born 27 June 1950) is a former English cricketer. Smyth was a right-handed batsman. He was born at Chichester, Sussex, and was educated at Brighton College.

Smyth made his first-class debut for Sussex against Surrey in 1970 County Championship. He made two further first-class appearances for the county, both which came in 1970 against Worcestershire and a tour match against the visiting Jamaicans. In his three first-class appearances, he scored a total of 42 runs at an average of 8.40, with a high score of 25. Smyth made a single List A appearance in that season against Worcestershire in the John Player League, ending Sussex's innings unbeaten on 4, with Worcestershire winning the match by 4 wickets.
