= Ian Waring =

English cricketer

Personal information
- Full name: Ian Charles Waring
- Born: 6 December 1963 (age 62); Chesterfield, Derbyshire, England
- Batting: Left-handed
- Bowling: Right-arm fast-medium

Domestic team information
- Years: Team
- 1985–1987: Sussex

Career statistics
Competition	First-class	List A
Matches	4	12
Runs scored	0	11
Batting average	0.00	5.50
100s/50s	–/–	–/–
Top score	0*	8
Balls bowled	432	468
Wickets	3	10
Bowling average	72.33	39.30
5 wickets in innings	–	–
10 wickets in match	–	–
Best bowling	2/76	3/26
Catches/stumpings	2/–	1/–
- Source: Cricinfo, 21 June 2012

Ian Charles Waring (born 6 December 1963) is a former English cricketer. Waring was a left-handed batsman who bowled right-arm fast-medium. He was born at Chesterfield, Derbyshire.

Waring made his debut for Sussex in a List A match against Surrey in the 1985 John Player Special League at the County Ground, Hove. He made a further appearance in that season's competition against Nottinghamshire at Cricket Field Road, Horsham. It was in that same season that he made his first-class debut against Glamorgan at Sophia Gardens in the 1985 County Championship. Waring only featured in one first team match for Sussex in 1986, a first-class fixture against Cambridge University at Hove. The following season, he made two first-class appearances in the 1987 County Championship against Derbyshire and Worcestershire. In what was to be his final season with Sussex, Waring featured more regularly in List A cricket, making ten appearances in 1987, the last of which came against Kent in the Refuge Assurance League. Waring's role in the Sussex team was as a bowler. In twelve List A matches for the county, he took 10 wickets at an average of 39.30, with best figures of 3/26. In four first-class appearances, he took 3 wickets at an average of 72.33, with best figures of 2/76.

== See also ==
- Cricket in England
