= David Manville =

English cricketer (1934–2015)

Personal information
- Full name: David Walter Manville
- Born: 18 August 1934; Hollingbury, Sussex, England
- Died: 26 August 2015 (aged 81); Burnley, England
- Batting: Right-handed
- Role: Wicket-keeper

Domestic team information
- Years: Team
- 1956: Sussex

Career statistics
Competition	First-class
Matches	3
Runs scored	13
Batting average	2.60
100s/50s	–/–
Top score	8
Balls bowled	–
Wickets	–
Bowling average	–
5 wickets in innings	–
10 wickets in match	–
Best bowling	–
Catches/stumpings	1/–
- Source: Cricinfo, 27 November 2011

David Walter Manville (18 August 1934 – 26 August 2015) was an English cricketer. Manville was a right-handed batsman who fielded as a wicket-keeper. He was born at Hollingbury, Sussex.

Manville made three first-class appearances for Sussex in the 1956 County Championship against Warwickshire, Kent and Leicestershire. In his three matches, he scored a total of 13 runs at an average of 2.60, with a high score of 8.

Manville died in Burnley on 26 August 2015, at the age of 81.
