= Reginald Pinfield =

English cricketer

Personal information
- Full name: Reginald Gordon Cecil Pinfield
- Born: 31 December 1894; Chippenham, Wiltshire, England
- Died: 2 February 1972 (aged 77); Branksome, Dorset, England
- Batting: Unknown

Domestic team information
- Years: Team
- 1922: Sussex
- 1911–1920: Wiltshire

Career statistics
Competition	First-class
Matches	4
Runs scored	97
Batting average	16.16
100s/50s	0/0
Top score	42*
Catches/stumpings	6/–
- Source: Cricinfo, 15 January 2012

Reginald Gordon Cecil Pinfield (31 December 1894 – 2 February 1972) was an English cricketer. Pinfield's batting style is unknown. He was born at Chippenham, Wiltshire.

Pinfield made his debut in county cricket for Wiltshire in the 1911 Minor Counties Championship against the Kent Second XI. He played Minor counties cricket for Wiltshire infrequently, making ten further appearances to 1913. Pinfield later served in World War I, where in 1916 he was a 2nd Lieutenant serving with the Royal Naval Air Service, though he was on duty with the Royal Flying Corps. In November 1918, he was promoted to Lieutenant. Following the war, Pinfield briefly played twice for Wiltshire in 1920 against Glamorgan and the Surrey Second XI in the Minor Counties Championship. Two years later, he made his first-class debut while playing for Sussex in the 1922 County Championship against Worcestershire. He made three further first-class appearances in that seasons County Championship, against Surrey, Middlesex and Warwickshire. In his four first-class appearances for Sussex, he scored 97 runs at an average of 16.16, with a high score of 42 not out.

He died at Branksome, Dorset on 2 February 1972.
