= Henry Mawle =

English cricketer

Henry Mawle (14 January 1871 — 13 November 1943) was an English cricketer. He was born in Bexhill-on-Sea and died in Ugborough.

Mawle made just one first-class appearance for Sussex, against Kent in 1896. He batted in just one innings in the match, as a tailender, though he failed to score a run.
