= Walter Greenhill =

English cricketer

Personal information
- Full name: Walter Greenhill
- Born: 19 June 1849; St John's Wood, London, England
- Died: 26 June 1913 (aged 64); Warsash, Hampshire, England
- Batting: Right-handed

Domestic team information
- Years: Team
- 1868: Sussex

Career statistics
Competition	First-class
Matches	2
Runs scored	24
Batting average	6.00
100s/50s	–/–
Top score	15
Balls bowled	87
Wickets	–
Bowling average	–
5 wickets in innings	–
10 wickets in match	–
Best bowling	–
Catches/stumpings	2/–
- Source: Cricinfo, 16 December 2011

Walter Greenhill (19 June 1849 – 29 June 1913) was an English cricketer. Greenhill was a right-handed batsman. He was born at St John's Wood, London.

Greenhill made two first-class appearances for Sussex, both against Surrey in 1868. In the first match against Surrey at The Oval, Greenhill scored 15 runs before being dismissed by John Bristow, while in their second-innings he was dismissed by Tom Sewell for 3 runs. Surrey won the match by 7 wickets. In the second match at the Royal Brunswick Ground, Hove, he was dismissed for 2 runs in Sussex's first-innings by James Street, while in their second-innings he was dismissed for 4 runs by George Griffith. Surrey won the match by 9 wickets.

He died at Warsash, Hampshire on 29 June 1913.
