= Frederick Worger =

English cricketer

Frederick Worger (22 August 1871 — 18 November 1954) was an English cricketer who played first-class cricket for Sussex. He was born and died in Brighton.

Worger's only first-class appearance came during 1892 in a game against Marylebone Cricket Club. He scored just one run with the bat in the match, scoring a duck in the second innings. He took two catches.
