= Robert Hunt (cricketer, born 1915) =

English cricketer

Robert Geoffrey Hunt (13 April 1915 – 10 January 2010) was an English cricketer active from 1935 to 1947 who played for Sussex. He was born in Horsham and died in Cheltenham. He appeared in 26 first-class matches as a righthanded batsman who bowled off breaks. He scored 831 runs with a highest score of 117 and took 31 wickets with a best performance of five for 51.
