= Frederick Haslett =

English cricketer

Domestic team information
- Years: Team
- 1837–1841: Sussex

Career statistics
Competition	First-class
Matches	6
Runs scored	26
Batting average	2.60
100s/50s	0/0
Top score	16
Catches/stumpings	3/–
- Source: Cricinfo, 7 January 2012

Frederick Haslett (dates of birth and death unknown) was an English cricketer. Haslett's batting style is unknown. Though unknown when and where he was born, it is known he was christened at Petworth, Sussex on 12 August 1817.

Haslett made his first-class debut for Sussex against the Marylebone Cricket Club in 1837. He made four further first-class appearances that season, that last of which came against Nottinghamshire. He scored 23 runs in his five matches that season, which came at an average of 2.87, with a high score of 16. He later made a single first-class appearance for Sussex County Cricket Club in 1841 at Lord's against the Marylebone Cricket Club. He batted at number ten in Sussex's first-innings of 48 all out, scoring 3 runs before he was dismissed by John Bayley. Kent were dismissed for 44 in their reply, with Sussex going on to make 93 in their second-innings, in which Haslett was promoted to open the batting, from which he was dismissed for a duck by James Cobbett. The Marylebone Cricket Club made 98/7 in their second-innings to win the match by 3 wickets.
