= Richard Thomson (cricketer) =

English cricketer

Personal information
- Full name: Richard Harry Thomson
- Born: 19 October 1938 (age 88); Bexhill-on-Sea, Sussex, England
- Batting: Left-handed

Domestic team information
- Years: Team
- 1961: Sussex
- 1961–1962: Cambridge University

Career statistics
| Competition | First-class |
|---|---|
| Matches | 25 |
| Runs scored | 883 |
| Batting average | 20.53 |
| 100s/50s | –/5 |
| Top score | 84 |
| Balls bowled | 6 |
| Wickets | – |
| Bowling average | – |
| 5 wickets in innings | – |
| 10 wickets in match | – |
| Best bowling | – |
| Catches/stumpings | 15/– |
- Source: Cricinfo, 3 January 2012

Richard Harry Thomson (born 19 October 1938) is a former English cricketer. Thomson was a left-handed batsman. He was born at Bexhill-on-Sea, Sussex.

Thomson made his first-class debut for Cambridge University against Lancashire in 1961. He made 22 further first-class appearances for the university, the last of which came against Oxford University in the 1962 University Match at Lord's. In his 23 first-class matches for the university, he scored a total of 853 runs at an average of 21.87, with a high score of 84. This score was one of five half centuries he made for the university and came against the Marylebone Cricket Club in 1962. He also played two first-class matches for his native Sussex in the 1961 County Championship, against Leicestershire at Manor Sports Ground, Worthing and Worcestershire at the County Ground, Hove. He had little success in these two matches, scoring a total of 30 runs at an average of 7.50, with a high score of 21.
