= Charles Gausden =

English cricketer

Personal information
- Full name: Charles Henry Gausden
- Born: c. 1826; Brasted, Kent, England
- Died: 5 September 1886 (aged 59–60); St Leonards-on-Sea, Sussex, England
- Batting: Unknown

Domestic team information
- Years: Team
- 1847–1851: Sussex

Career statistics
Competition	First-class
Matches	5
Runs scored	41
Batting average	5.85
100s/50s	–/–
Top score	17
Balls bowled	–
Wickets	–
Bowling average	–
5 wickets in innings	–
10 wickets in match	–
Best bowling	–
Catches/stumpings	3/–
- Source: Cricinfo, 18 December 2011

Charles Henry Gausden (c. 1826 – 5 September 1886) was an English cricketer. Gausden's batting style is unknown. He was born at Brasted, Kent.

Gausden made his first-class debut for Sussex against the Marylebone Cricket Club in 1847. He made four further first-class appearances for the county, the last of which came against the Marylebone Cricket Club in 1851. In his five first-class matches, he scored 41 runs at an average of 5.85, with a high score of 17.

He died at St Leonards-on-Sea, Sussex in 1886.
