= Basil Talbot =

English cricketer

Personal information
- Full name: Basil Lynch Talbot
- Born: 23 February 1903; Southsea, Hampshire, England
- Died: 18 February 1962 (aged 58); Shitterton, Dorset, England
- Batting: Right-handed
- Role: Wicket-keeper

Domestic team information
- Years: Team
- 1947: Sussex

Career statistics
Competition	First-class
Matches	1
Runs scored	35
Batting average	17.50
100s/50s	–/–
Top score	25
Balls bowled	–
Wickets	–
Bowling average	–
5 wickets in innings	–
10 wickets in match	–
Best bowling	–
Catches/stumpings	2/–
- Source: Cricinfo, 17 January 2012

Basil Lynch Talbot (23 February 1903 – 18 February 1962) was an English cricketer. Talbot was a right-handed batsman who fielded as a wicket-keeper. He was born at Southsea, Hampshire.

Talbot made a single first-class appearance for Sussex against Oxford University at Priory Park, Chichester, in 1947. Oxford University were dismissed for 252 in their first-innings, with Sussex scoring 198 in response, with Talbot scoring 25 runs before he was dismissed by Abdul Kardar. In Oxford University's second-innings, they made 302, leaving Sussex with a target of 356. Sussex could only make 204 in their chase to lose the match by 152, with 10 runs during the chase, before he was dismissed by Kardar.

He died at Shitterton, Dorset on 18 February 1962.
