= John Penikett =

English cricketer

John Penikett (25 December 1819 – date of death unknown) was an English cricketer. Skinner's batting and bowling styles are unknown.

John Penikett was born in Henfield, Sussex. A round-arm bowler, Penikett played for the Henfield Cricket Club from 1842 to 1868. In the middle of the 19th century, the Village of Henfield provided seven players for the Sussex County team, among them John Penikett. On 30 August 1867, in a match against Broadwater, Penikett scored 121 runs, the first century ever recorded by a Henfield-born player at Henfield.

Penikett made his first-class debut for Sussex against the Marylebone Cricket Club in 1850. He made three further first-class appearances, the last of which came against the Marylebone Cricket Club in 1851. In his four first-class matches, he scored 16 runs at an average of 2.66, with a high score of 6. With the ball, he took a single wicket, though his bowling average and best figures are unknown due to incomplete records.

John Penikett was the great-grandfather of Eric John Penikett, the last survivor of RAF Squadron 87, which fought the Luftwaffe over northern France in the early days of the second world war and the great-great-great-grandfather of actor John Tahmoh Penikett.
