= Derek Preston =

English cricketer (born 1936)

Personal information
- Full name: Derek Preston
- Born: 12 January 1936 (age 90); Leyton, Essex, England
- Batting: Right-handed
- Bowling: Slow left-arm orthodox

Domestic team information
- Years: Team
- 1959: Sussex

Career statistics
Competition	First-class
Matches	12
Runs scored	154
Batting average	11.84
100s/50s	–/1
Top score	54
Balls bowled	1,514
Wickets	13
Bowling average	43.23
5 wickets in innings	–
10 wickets in match	–
Best bowling	3/45
Catches/stumpings	8/–
- Source: Cricinfo, 17 June 2012

Derek Preston (born 12 January 1936) is a former English cricketer. Derek Preston was a right-handed batsman who bowled slow left-arm orthodox. He was born at Leyton, Essex.

Derek Preston made his first-class debut for Sussex against Worcestershire at the County Ground, Hove, in the 1959 County Championship. He made eleven further first-class appearances for the county in that season, the last of which came against Derbyshire at Manor Sports Ground, Worthing. In his twelve matches for Sussex, he scored 154 runs at an average of 11.84, with a high score of 54. This score was his only half century and came against Nottinghamshire at Trent Bridge. With the ball, he took 13 wickets at a bowling average of 43.23, with best figures of 3/45.
