= William Sherwin (cricketer) =

English cricketer

Personal information
- Full name: William Legh Sherwin
- Born: 1839; Petworth, Sussex, England
- Died: 1873 (aged 33–34); Petworth, Sussex, England
- Batting: Unknown

Domestic team information
- Years: Team
- 1861: Sussex

Career statistics
Competition	First-class
Matches	2
Runs scored	2
Batting average	0.66
100s/50s	–/–
Top score	1
Balls bowled	–
Wickets	–
Bowling average	–
5 wickets in innings	–
10 wickets in match	–
Best bowling	–
Catches/stumpings	3/–
- Source: Cricinfo, 17 December 2011

William Legh Sherwin (1839–1873) was an English cricketer. Sherwin's batting style is unknown. He was born at Petworth, Sussex.

Sherwin made two first-class appearances for Sussex, both against Kent in 1861. In the first match against Kent at Royal Brunswick Ground, Hove, Sherwin was run out for a duck in Sussex's first-innings, while in their second-innings he was dismissed by Edgar Willsher for a single run. Kent won the match by 8 wickets. In the return match at the Higher Common Ground, Tunbridge Wells, he was dismissed for a single run in Sussex's first-innings by Willsher, while in their second-innings he batted down the order at number eleven and finished unbeaten on 0. Kent won the match by 34 runs.

He died at the town of his birth in 1873, aged 33 or 34.
