= Richard Holt (cricketer) =

English cricketer

Richard Anthony Appleby Holt (11 March 1920 – 18 May 2001) was an English cricketer active from 1938 to 1947 who played for Sussex. He was born and died in Kensington. He appeared in six first-class matches as a righthanded batsman who scored 60 runs with a highest score of 30.
