= Joseph Shoesmith =

English cricketer

Personal information
- Full name: Joseph Shoesmith
- Born: 17 June 1859; Kemp Town, Sussex, England
- Died: 9 April 1901 (aged 41); Brighton, Sussex, England
- Batting: Unknown
- Bowling: Unknown

Domestic team information
- Years: Team
- 1881: Sussex

Career statistics
Competition	First-class
Matches	1
Runs scored	2
Batting average	2.00
100s/50s	–/–
Top score	2
Balls bowled	64
Wickets	1
Bowling average	23.00
5 wickets in innings	–
10 wickets in match	–
Best bowling	1/23
Catches/stumpings	–/–
- Source: Cricinfo, 12 December 2011

Joseph Shoesmith (sometimes rendered Shoosmith; 17 June 1859 – 9 April 1901) was an English cricketer. Shoesmith's batting and bowling styles are unknown. He was born at Kemp Town, Sussex.

Shoesmith made a single first-class appearance for Sussex against Yorkshire at Bramall Lane, Sheffield in 1881. In Sussex's first innings he was dismissed for 2 runs by Allen Hill. He took the wicket of Hill in Yorkshire's first innings, finishing with figures of 1/23 from 16 overs. In Sussex's second innings he ended unbeaten on 0, with Yorkshire going on to winning by 9 wickets. This was his only major appearance for Sussex.

In 1881, he was shown in the Census as living with his parents at 2 Eastern Quadrant, Brighton. The family name is given as Shoesmith although CricketArchive in its profile of the player has rendered the name "Shoosmith". His father William was born at Lewes, Sussex and worked as a baker, muffin and crumpet maker. He was aged 46 in 1881. His mother Mary was born at Pembroke, Wales. He had four sisters, two of which were employed as teachers. He died at Brighton on 9 April 1901.
