= George Shoesmith =

English cricketer (1842–1877)

Personal information
- Full name: George Shoesmith
- Born: 19 October 1842; Storrington, Sussex, England
- Died: 27 July 1877 (aged 34); Sutton, Sussex, England
- Batting: Left-handed
- Bowling: Right-arm roundarm fast

Domestic team information
- Years: Team
- 1869–1871: Sussex

Career statistics
Competition	First-class
Matches	11
Runs scored	91
Batting average	7.00
100s/50s	–/–
Top score	17*
Balls bowled	1,244
Wickets	20
Bowling average	23.35
5 wickets in innings	1
10 wickets in match	–
Best bowling	5/48
Catches/stumpings	5/–
- Source: Cricinfo, 24 May 2013

George Shoesmith (19 October 1842 – 27 July 1877) was an English cricketer. Shoesmith was a left-handed batsman who bowled right-arm roundarm fast. He was born at Storrington, Sussex.

Shoemsith made his first-class debut for Sussex against Surrey in 1869 at The Oval, with him making four further first-class appearances in that season. The following season he made just a single first-class appearance against Kent, before making five further first-class appearances in 1871, the last of which came against Surrey. Playing as a bowler, Shoesmith took 20 wickets at an average of 23.35, with best figures of 5/48. This was his only first-class five wicket haul and came against the Marylebone Cricket Club in 1871. As a tailend batsman, Shoesmith scored 91 runs at a batting average of 7.00, and a high score of 17 not out.

Besides playing, Shoesmith also stood as an umpire in two first-class matches, one in 1873 in the Gentlemen v Players fixture and in 1875 between the Gentlemen of the South and the Players of the North. He died at Sutton, Sussex on 27 July 1877.
