= George Pescott =

English cricketer

George Pescott (christened 29 June 1806) was an English cricketer who played for Sussex. He was born in Heyshott, West Sussex.

George Pescott made a single first-class appearance for the team, in 1840. He failed to score a run in the two innings in which he batted.
