= Henry Tebay =

English cricketer

Personal information
- Full name: Henry Tebay
- Born: 5 October 1866; East Grinstead, Sussex, England, United Kingdom
- Died: 4 June 1946 (aged 79); Bromley, Kent, England, United Kingdom
- Batting: Right-handed

Domestic team information
- Years: Team
- 1886–1890: Sussex

Career statistics
Competition	First-class
Matches	18
Runs scored	265
Batting average	7.36
100s/50s	–/–
Top score	43
Balls bowled	–
Wickets	–
Bowling average	–
5 wickets in innings	–
10 wickets in match	–
Best bowling	–
Catches/stumpings	19/–
- Source: Cricinfo, 1 July 2012

Henry Tebay (5 October 1866 – 4 June 1946) was an English cricketer. Tebay was a right-handed batsman. He was born at East Grinstead, Sussex.

Tebay made his first-class debut for Sussex against Nottinghamshire at Trent Bridge in 1886. He made seventeen further first-class appearances for the county, the last of which came against Surrey at the Oval in the 1890 County Championship. In his eighteen first-class matches, he scored a total of 265 runs at an average of 7.36, with a high score of 43.

He died at Bromley, Kent, on 4 June 1946.
