= William Millard (cricketer) =

English cricketer (1856–1923)

Personal information
- Full name: William Henry Millard
- Born: 25 May 1856; New Swindon, Wiltshire, England
- Died: 20 July 1923 (aged 67); Tenby, Pembrokeshire, Wales
- Batting: Right-handed
- Bowling: Unknown

Domestic team information
- Years: Team
- 1879–1880: Sussex

Career statistics
Competition	First-class
Matches	5
Runs scored	54
Batting average	6.75
100s/50s	–/–
Top score	26
Balls bowled	108
Wickets	2
Bowling average	22.00
5 wickets in innings	–
10 wickets in match	–
Best bowling	2/32
Catches/stumpings	3/–
- Source: Cricinfo, 16 December 2011

William Henry Millard (25 May 1856 – 20 July 1923) was an English cricketer. Millard was a right-handed batting whose bowling style is unknown. He was born at New Swindon, Wiltshire.

Millard made his first-class debut for Sussex against Kent at the County Ground, Hove. He made four further first-class appearances for the county, the last of which came against the Marylebone Cricket Club in 1880. In his five first-class matches, he scored a total of 54 runs at an average of 6.75, with a high score of 26. With the ball, he took 2 wickets at a bowling average of 22.00, with best figures of 2/32.

He died at Tenby, Pembrokeshire, Wales on 20 July 1923.
