= William Dible =

English cricketer

Personal information
- Full name: William Guy Dible
- Born: 5 November 1861; Southampton, Hampshire, England
- Died: 15 August 1894 (aged 32); Fareham, Hampshire, England
- Batting: Right-handed
- Bowling: Right-arm fast

Domestic team information
- Years: Team
- 1882: Surrey
- 1883–1890: Hampshire

Career statistics
Competition	First-class
Matches	26
Runs scored	503
Batting average	12.89
100s/50s	–/1
Top score	63
Balls bowled	4,969
Wickets	90
Bowling average	22.17
5 wickets in innings	5
10 wickets in match	1
Best bowling	7/60
Catches/stumpings	18/–
- Source: Cricinfo, 14 February 2010

William Guy Dible (5 November 1861 — 15 August 1894) was an English first-class cricketer.

Dible was born in Southampton in November 1861. Dible made his debut in first-class cricket for Surrey against the touring Australians at The Oval in 1882, in what was his only appearance for Surrey. In 1883, he was engaged by Hampshire, debuting for Hampshire in that season against Sussex at Hove, with him taking figures of 5 for 69 in the Sussex first innings. He played first-class cricket for Hampshire until the county lost its first-class status at the end of the 1885 season, with Dible making 25 appearances. He had success as an effective right-arm fast bowler, taking 90 wickets at an average of 22.12; he took five wickets in an innings on five occasions and ten wickets in a match once. His career best innings bowling figures were 7 for 60. As a batsman, he scored 495 runs for Hampshire at an average of 13.37, making one half century score of 68. Following the loss of Hampshire's first-class status, he continued to play second-class matches for Hampshire until 1890. Dible died at Fareham on 15 August 1894.
