= John Hyde (cricketer) =

English cricketer

Personal information
- Full name: John Hyde
- Born: 11 September 1827; Pulborough, Sussex, England
- Died: 7 October 1893 (aged 66); Nuthurst, Sussex, England
- Batting: Unknown
- Bowling: Unknown

Domestic team information
- Years: Team
- 1852: Sussex

Career statistics
Competition	First-class
Matches	8
Runs scored	29
Batting average	2.90
100s/50s	0/0
Top score	7*
Balls bowled	316
Wickets	10
Bowling average	12.87
5 wickets in innings	0
10 wickets in match	0
Best bowling	4/8
Catches/stumpings	5/–
- Source: Cricket Archive, 1 April 2020

John Hyde (11 September 1827 – 7 October 1893) was an English cricketer. Hyde's batting and bowling styles are unknown. He was born at Pulborough, Sussex.

Hyde made his first-class debut for Sussex against an All England Eleven at Priory Park, Chichester in 1852. He made five further first-class appearances for Sussex in that season, the last of which came against Surrey. In his six first-class matches for Sussex, he took 4 wickets at an approximate average of 32.50, while the most wickets he took in a single innings is two, his best figures for Sussex were not recorded. With the bat, he scored a total of 20 runs at a batting average of 2.85, with a high score of 7 not out. Hyde also made a single first-class appearance for a combined Kent and Sussex team against an All England Eleven in 1853, taking a single wicket in the match. His final first-class appearance also came in that year, for a United England Eleven against the Gentlemen of England, in which he took 5 wickets and his career best bowling figures of 4/8.

He died in Nuthurst, Sussex on 7 October 1893 aged 66.
