= Laurie Eastman =

English cricketer

- Eastman in 1927

Personal information
- Full name: Lawrence Charles Eastman
- Born: 3 June 1897; Enfield Wash, Middlesex, England
- Died: 17 April 1941 (aged 43); Harefield, Middlesex, England
- Batting: Right-handed
- Bowling: Right-arm medium; Right-arm leg-spin
- Role: All-rounder

Domestic team information
- Years: Team
- 1920–1939: Essex
- 1927/28–1928/29: Otago

Career statistics
Competition	First-class
Matches	451
Runs scored	13,385
Batting average	20.81
100s/50s	7/61
Top score	161
Balls bowled	63,136
Wickets	1,006
Bowling average	26.77
5 wickets in innings	30
10 wickets in match	3
Best bowling	7/28
Catches/stumpings	259/–
- Source: Cricinfo, 30 November 2019

Lawrence Charles Eastman DCM MM (3 June 1897 – 17 April 1941) was an English cricketer. He played for Essex County Cricket Club between 1920 and 1939.

An all-rounder, Eastman first played for Essex as an amateur and was appointed assistant secretary of the club, before becoming a professional in 1927. He was originally a medium-pace bowler, but developed leg-spin later in his career. He coached in New Zealand in 1927–28 and 1928–29, when he played for Otago; he also coached in South Africa.

Eastman fought in the First World War and was awarded the Distinguished Conduct Medal and Military Medal. He died in the Second World War of an illness contracted after a high-explosive bomb exploded close to him whilst he was serving as an air raid warden.
