= List of Gentlemen cricketers (1841–1962) =

This is a complete list of cricketers who made their debuts for the Gentlemen in the annual Gentlemen v Players fixture from 1841 to 1962. Cricketers who represented other teams styled "Gentlemen" are not included. The cricketers are listed chronologically by year of debut but some of the names are still redlinks. The dates in parentheses are the span of years in which the cricketer made appearances for the Gentlemen teams.

== 1841 to 1850 ==
- George Barton (1841)
- George Boudier (1841–1843)
- George Langdon (1841–1842)
- Ralph Nicholson (1841)
- Pierrepont Mundy (1842)
- Robert Grimston (1842–1849)
- Charles Coltson (1843)
- William Pickering (1843–1846)
- Joseph Spencer (1844)
- Frederick Fagge (1844–1846)
- John Dolignon (1844)
- Straton Campbell (1844)
- William Lautour (1844)
- Alfred Smith (1845)
- Charles Hawkins (1845)
- Edward Dewing (1845)
- William Humphry (1845)
- William Napper (1845)
- Arthur Haygarth (1846–1859)
- Edward Hartopp (1846–1851)
- Richard Long (1846)
- William Nicholson (1846–1858)
- Arthur Hoare (1847)
- Gerald Yonge (1847–1852)
- Harvey Fellows (1847–1851)
- John Lee (1847–1850)
- Oliver Pell (1847–1848)
- Robert Turner King (1847–1851)
- Charles Ridding (1848–1853)
- Edward Elmhirst (1848)
- Edmund Reeves (1848)
- William Ridding (1849–1850)

== 1851 to 1860 ==
- Edward McNiven (1851)
- George Gilbert (1851)
- Henry Vernon (1851–1854)
- Richard Skelton (1851)
- S. C. B. Ponsonby (1851–1858)
- Edward Balfour (1852–1854)
- John Walker (1852–1863)
- Charles Wynch (1853–1860)
- Henry Aitken (1853)
- Reginald Hankey (1853–1860)
- Matthews Kempson (1853)
- Alfred Payne (1854–1864)
- C. D. B. Marsham (1854–1862)
- Edward Drake (1854–1864)
- Frederic Walker (1854–1857)
- Frederick Miller (1855–1863)
- Henry Nicholson (1855)
- Walter Fellows (1855–1857)
- John Fuller (1856–1858)
- V. E. Walker (1856–1869)
- Arthur Henry Walker (1857–1861)
- C. G. Lane (1857–1861)
- Charles Marsham (1857)
- Frederick Burbidge (1857–1865)
- Joseph McCormick (1857)
- Frederick Norman (1858)
- George Hodgkinson (1858)
- Henry Frere (1858–1859)
- Joseph Makinson (1858–1864)
- Richard Daft (1858)
- Alexander Rowley (1859–1863)
- Edward Fawcett (1859–1860)
- Ernest Sandford (1859)
- John Hale (1859–1860)
- Robert Marsham (1859–1862)
- William Traill (1859–1867)
- William Benthall (1859–1863)
- William Lockhart (1859)
- Brian Waud (1860)
- Robert Lang (1860–1862)
- Thomas Bagge (1860–1861)

== 1861 to 1870 ==
- C. G. Lyttelton (1861–1866)
- Edward Dowson (1861–1863)
- Frederick Lee (1861–1862)
- George Randall Johnson (1861–1862)
- Herbert Marshall (1861–1862)
- John Oliphant (1861)
- Thomas Garnier (1861)
- Arthur Daniel (1862–1867)
- Edmund Rowley (1862)
- E. M. Grace (1862–1886)
- Henry Arkwright (1862–1864)
- R. A. H. Mitchell (1862–1871)
- Frank Wright (1863)
- Russell Walker (1863–1868)
- Stirling Voules (1863–1866)
- Thomas de Grey (1863)
- Edward Tritton (1864–1867)
- George Kelson (1864–1866)
- Henry Bull (1864)
- James Round (1864–1868)
- William Fuller-Maitland (1864–1869)
- Anthony Wilkinson (1865)
- Bransby Cooper (1865–1869)
- Charles Buller (1865–1874)
- Frederic Evans (1865)
- I. D. Walker (1865–1877)
- W. G. Grace (1865–1906)
- Arthur Winter (1866)
- Alfred Lubbock (1866–1871)
- Edward Fellowes (1866)
- Robert Balfour (1866)
- Arthur Appleby (1867–1889)
- C. A. Absolom (1868–1874)
- David Buchanan (1868–1874)
- Henry Richardson (1868)
- Robert Lipscomb (1868)
- A. N. Hornby (1869–1886)
- C. I. Thornton (1869–1875)
- Bernard Pauncefote (1869–1871)
- Charles Green (1869–1875)
- Walter Money (1869–1870)
- William Yardley (1869–1874)
- Cuthbert Ottaway (1870–1876)
- Charles Francis (1870–1875)
- John Dale (1870–1872)
- Richard Halliwell (1870–1873)
- Fred Grace (1870–1878)

== 1871 to 1880 ==
- Jem Shaw (1871–1874)
- Edward Tylecote (1871–1886)
- George Strachan (1871–1880)
- Montague Turner (1871–1872)
- Samuel Butler (1871)
- Walter Hadow (1871–1876)
- Edward Brice (1872)
- Walter Powys (1872)
- Arthur Ridley (1873–1883)
- Charles Nepean (1873)
- F. E. R. Fryer (1873–1875)
- Frederick Stokes (1873–1874)
- George Longman (1873–1876)
- Henry Renny-Tailyour (1873–1875)
- William Law (1873)
- Arthur Tabor (1874)
- Frank Townsend (1874–1885)
- Hamilton Ross (1874)
- J. A. Bush (1874–1875)
- Walter Gilbert (1874–1878)
- A. J. Webbe (1875–1877)
- Charles Brune (1875)
- George Wyatt (1875)
- Lord Harris (1875–1884)
- Joseph Cotterill (1875–1877)
- Robert Smith (1875)
- William Williams (1875)
- Alfred Lyttelton (1876–1881)
- A. P. Lucas (1876–1889)
- Frank Penn (1876–1881)
- W. S. Patterson (1876–1877)
- Edward Butler (1877)
- Francis Monkland (1877)
- F. M. Buckland (1877)
- Henry Tylecote (1877)
- Walter Read (1877–1896)
- A. G. Steel (1878–1891)
- Alfred Evans (1878–1885)
- Edward Lyttelton (1878)
- George Vernon (1879–1897)
- Ivo Bligh (1879–1880)
- John Shuter (1879–1890)
- Hugh Rotherham (1880–1884)
- Philip Morton (1880–1882)
- Thomas Pearson (1880–1881)

== 1881 to 1890 ==
- Arthur Trevor (1881)
- Charles Leslie (1881–1883)
- Charles Studd (1881–1883)
- George Studd (1881–1882)
- Herbert Whitfeld (1881)
- Morton Lucas (1881)
- Robert Ellis (1881)
- Walter Bettesworth (1881)
- Gerald Leatham (1882)
- Vernon Royle (1882)
- W. H. Patterson (1882–1888)
- Charles Wright (1883–1897)
- Joseph Frank (1883)
- Manley Kemp (1883–1885)
- Walter Forbes (1883)
- Edwin Diver (1884)
- Tristram Welman (1884)
- Hugh Whitby (1884)
- Herbert Page (1884–1894)
- James Robertson (1884–1886)
- Percy de Paravicini (1884)
- Stanley Christopherson (1884–1885)
- Tim O'Brien (1884–1896)
- Trevitt Hine-Haycock (1884)
- Charles Horner (1885)
- Charles Toppin (1885–1886)
- E. W. Bastard (1885)
- Frederick Lucas (1885–1886)
- Herbert Bainbridge (1885–1895)
- Joseph Brain (1885)
- Kingsmill Key (1885–1889)
- William Roller (1885–1890)
- Billy Newham (1885–1903)
- William Pullen (1885)
- Alfred Cochrane (1886)
- Arthur Dorman (1886)
- Harry Daft (1886)
- John Turner (1886)
- James Walker (1886)
- Octavius Radcliffe (1886–1889)
- Stanley Scott (1886–1892)
- Arthur Sutthery (1887)
- Arthur Newnham (1887)
- Andrew Stoddart (1887–1898)
- Evan Nepean (1887–1892)
- Edward Buckland (1887)
- Frank Marchant (1887)
- Hylton Philipson (1887–1892)
- Henry Forster (1887)
- Lord Hawke (1887–1908)
- C. Aubrey Smith (1888–1891)
- Cyril Buxton (1888)
- Francis Ford (1888–1897)
- John Dixon (1888–1898)
- Joseph Eccles (1888–1889)
- Lord George Scott (1888)
- Monty Bowden (1888)
- Sammy Woods (1888–1902)
- Edward McCormick (1889)
- Francis Bishop (1889)
- Herbert Pigg (1889–1891)
- James Cranston (1889–1890)
- Edward Champion Streatfeild (1890–1892)
- Fred Spofforth (1890–1897)
- Gregor MacGregor (1890–1907)
- Robert Noel Douglas (1890–1891)
- Coote Hedley (1890–1892)

== 1891 to 1900 ==
- Arthur Hill (1891–1907)
- Arthur Kemble (1891–1894)
- Billy Murdoch (1891–1904)
- Ernest Smith (1891–1906)
- J. J. Ferris (1891–1894)
- Stanley Jackson (1891–1906)
- Charles de Trafford (1892)
- Cyril Wells (1892–1901)
- Francis Lacey (1892)
- George Berkeley (1892)
- Godfrey Papillon (1892)
- Herbie Hewett (1892–1894)
- Lionel Palairet (1892–1898)
- Leslie Gay (1892)
- Sydney Crosfield (1892)
- A. C. MacLaren (1893–1909)
- C. B. Fry (1893–1914)
- Charles Kortright (1893–1900)
- Hugh Bromley-Davenport (1893)
- Levi Wright (1893–1905)
- Percy Latham (1893)
- Ranjitsinhji (1893–1912)
- Archie Wickham (1894–1903)
- Digby Jephson (1894–1902)
- Frank Mitchell (1894–1897)
- George Glossop Walker (1894)
- Gerald Mordaunt (1894–1895)
- Henry Tindall (1894)
- James Douglas (1894–1903)
- Jack Mason (1894–1913)
- Lawrence Bathurst (1894)
- Thomas Perkins (1894)
- W. G. Grace junior (1894–1897)
- George Hillyard (1895)
- H. D. G. Leveson Gower (1895–1920)
- Lucius Gwynn (1895–1896)
- Frank Druce (1895)
- Robert Slade Lucas (1895)
- A. O. Jones (1896–1907)
- Charlie Townsend (1896–1900)
- Frederick Bull (1896–1897)
- Herbert Hayman (1896–1901)
- H. K. Foster (1896–1910)
- Percy Perrin (1896–1906)
- Richard Lewis (1896–1898)
- Arthur Newton (1897–1902)
- Charlie McGahey (1897–1905)
- Teddy Wynyard (1897–1906)
- Francis Bateman-Champain (1897–1899)
- Foster Cunliffe (1897)
- Frank Milligan (1897–1898)
- George Brann (1897)
- Gilbert Jessop (1897–1914)
- Harry Chinnery (1897–1898)
- Haldane Stewart (1897)
- Pelham Warner (1897–1919)
- Reginald Rice (1897)
- Sidney Kitcat (1897)
- Stephen Charles (1897–1898)
- Vivian Crawford (1897–1910)
- Bill Bradley (1897–1903)
- Arthur Turner (1898)
- Cyril Sewell (1898–1901)
- Francis Stocks (1898–1899)
- Wilfred Stoddart (1898)
- Walter Troup (1898–1902)
- B. J. T. Bosanquet (1899–1911)
- Henry Martyn (1899–1906)
- Robert Poore (1899)
- Alan Reynolds (1900)
- Archibald Fargus (1900)
- C. J. B. Wood (1900–1906)
- Cuthbert Burnup (1900–1903)
- Gerald Weigall (1900)
- R. E. Foster (1900–1907)
- Tom Taylor (1900–1902)
- William Whitwell (1900)
- Wilfrid Foster (1900–1903)

== 1901 to 1914 ==
- Ernest Halliwell (1901)
- J. G. Greig (1901)
- Jimmy Sinclair (1901)
- Kenneth Goldie (1901)
- Richard More (1901)
- William Robertson (1901)
- Alexander Eccles (1902)
- Ernest Steel (1902–1904)
- Edward Dowson (1902–1903)
- Rockley Wilson (1902–1922)
- George Beldam (1902–1907)
- Richard Brooks (1902)
- Tom Ross (1902)
- William Findlay (1902)
- Cecil Headlam (1903)
- Charles Robson (1903)
- George Simpson-Hayward (1903–1908)
- Harold McDonell (1903–1904)
- Hesketh Hesketh-Prichard (1903–1905)
- John Hartley (1903)
- Les Poidevin (1903)
- Reggie Spooner (1903–1919)
- Walter Brearley (1903–1911)
- William Evans (1903–1909)
- William Odell (1903–1907)
- Ernest Beldam (1904)
- Guy Napier (1904–1913)
- Henry Hunt (1904–1905)
- Leonard Harper (1904)
- Meyrick Payne (1904–1907)
- Robert Sheppard (1904)
- Billy Kingston (1904)
- Alfred Morcom (1905)
- J. F. Byrne (1905)
- Stanley Brown (1905)
- Wilfred Bird (1905–1913)
- Albert Lawton (1906–1907)
- Frederick Fane (1906–1913)
- Lord Dalmeny (1906)
- Jack Crawford (1906–1921)
- Johnny Douglas (1906–1927)
- Kenneth Hutchings (1906–1911)
- Leonard Colbeck (1906)
- Neville Knox (1906–1910)
- Percy May (1906)
- Alan Imlay (1907)
- Dick Young (1907)
- Charles Page (1908)
- Cyril Staples (1908)
- Frank Gillingham (1908–1925)
- Geoffrey Foster (1908–1910)
- Trevor Branston (1908)
- Humphrey Gilbert (1908–1910)
- Douglas Carr (1909–1913)
- Ted Dillon (1909)
- John Shields (1909)
- K. G. MacLeod (1909)
- Morice Bird (1909–1913)
- Randall Johnson (1909–1920)
- Reggie Schwarz (1909)
- Sydney Smith (1909–1914)
- Samuel Day (1909)
- Bill Greswell (1909–1928)
- Alfred Hartley (1910)
- Charles Hooman (1910)
- Frank Foster (1910–1914)
- Neville Tufnell (1910)
- Philip Le Couteur (1910–1911)
- Reginald Heygate (1910)
- William Burns (1910–1911)
- Alexander Johnston (1911–1912)
- Arthur Day (1911–1914)
- Aubrey Faulkner (1911–1920)
- Ion Campbell (1911)
- Kenneth Gibson (1911)
- Michael Falcon (1911–1927)
- John Evans (1912–1927)
- Douglas Robinson (1912–1924)
- Leslie Kidd (1912–1921)
- Harry Simms (1912–1913)
- Percy Fender (1913–1934)
- Reginald Lagden (1913)
- A. H. Hornby (1914)
- Arthur Jaques (1914)
- Ernest Kirk (1914)
- Frank Mann (1914–1930)
- Harold Garnett (1914)
- Jack White (1914–1930)

== 1919 to 1930 ==
- Arthur Carr (1919–1929)
- Clarence Bruce (1919–1928)
- Cecil Burton (1919–1921)
- Donald Knight (1919–1921)
- Gerald Crutchley (1919–1926)
- George Louden (1919–1925)
- Greville Stevens (1919–1931)
- Nigel Haig (1919–1932)
- Richard Twining (1919)
- Arthur Jewell (1920)
- A. P. F. Chapman (1920–1936)
- Colin McIver (1920)
- Freddie Calthorpe (1920–1933)
- George Wood (1920–1932)
- Hubert Ashton (1920–1927)
- Herbert Wilson (1920)
- Lionel Tennyson (1920–1935)
- Reginald Bettington (1920–1928)
- Vallance Jupp (1920–1931)
- Alfred Jeacocke (1921–1933)
- Charles Titchmarsh (1921–1925)
- Charles Marriott (1921–1933)
- John Morrison (1921)
- Tom Jameson (1921–1926)
- Arthur Fawcett (1922)
- Arthur Gilligan (1922–1927)
- Charles Fiddian-Green (1922)
- Harry Higgins (1922)
- Jimmy Bridges (1922–1924)
- Frank William Gilligan (1923–1931)
- Gilly Reay (1923)
- Gubby Allen (1923–1938)
- Johnnie Clay (1923–1935)
- Jack MacBryan (1923–1932)
- John MacLean (1923)
- Jack Bryan (1923–1928)
- Dar Lyon (1923–1930)
- Norman Riches (1923–1927)
- Tom Lowry (1923)
- Alexander Wilkinson (1923)
- Bev Lyon (1924–1930)
- Douglas Jardine (1924–1933)
- Guy Jackson (1924–1927)
- Horace Dales (1924)
- Harold Day (1924)
- James Hyndson (1924)
- Lionel Hedges (1924)
- Maurice Foster (1924)
- Philip Wright (1924)
- R. C. Robertson-Glasgow (1924–1935)
- Jack Meyer (1924–1938)
- Robert St Leger Fowler (1924)
- William Haworth (1924)
- Adrian Gore (1925)
- Eddie Dawson (1925–1931)
- Gerald Livock (1925)
- George Stephens (1925)
- Tommy Enthoven (1925–1934)
- Joseph Thorley (1925)
- Kumar Shri Duleepsinhji (1925–1932)
- Mervyn Hill (1925)
- Noel Sherwell (1925)
- Ronnie Aird (1925)
- Bob Wyatt (1926–1947)
- George Challenor (1926)
- Walter Franklin (1926–1930)
- Charles Brutton (1927)
- Errol Holmes (1927–1936)
- Ian Peebles (1927–1935)
- John Parker (1927)
- Leonard Crawley (1927)
- Peter Eckersley (1927)
- Richard Utley (1927)
- Thomas Jacques (1927)
- Trevor Arnott (1927–1928)
- Tom Longfield (1927–1936)
- Sydney Rippon (1928)
- Alexander Hosie (1928)
- Aidan Crawley (1928–1931)
- Denys Hill (1928)
- Tom Killick (1928–1929)
- Wyndham Hazelton (1928)
- Edward Benson (1928–1929)
- Frederick Seabrook (1928)
- Monty Garland-Wells (1928–1938)
- Miles Howell (1928)
- Patrick Kingsley (1928)
- Reggie Ingle (1928)
- Reginald Machin (1928–1934)
- Walter Robins (1928–1952)
- Derek Foster (1929–1932)
- Graham Doggart (1929)
- Jack Parsons (1929–1931)
- Harold Gilligan (1930)
- Denis Moore (1930)
- Maurice Allom (1930–1934)
- Geoffrey Lowndes (1930–1933)

== 1931 to 1950 ==
- Giles Baring (1931–1934)
- Brian Hone (1931–1932)
- Box Case (1931–1934)
- Denys Morkel (1931–1934)
- Freddie Brown (1931–1953)
- George Kemp-Welch (1931)
- Tuppy Owen-Smith (1931–1937)
- Harold Palmer (1931)
- Iftikhar Ali Khan Pataudi (1931–1933)
- Hopper Levett (1931–1936)
- Arthur Hazlerigg (1932)
- Bryan Valentine (1932–1946)
- Cyril Walters (1932–1934)
- Herbie Taylor (1932)
- Joseph Comber (1932–1933)
- William Cook (1932)
- C. P. Johnstone (1933)
- Denys Wilcox (1933–1947)
- Grahame Parker (1933)
- Tom Smith (1933)
- Ken Farnes (1933–1939)
- Maurice Turnbull (1933–1936)
- Jahangir Khan (1933–1934)
- Peter Oldfield (1933)
- Reginald Hudson (1933)
- Arthur Sellers (1934–1938)
- Arthur Baxter (1934)
- Alan Fairfax (1934)
- Adam Powell (1934)
- Alan Melville (1934–1936)
- Cyril Hamilton (1934)
- Hopper Read (1934–1935)
- John Richardson (1934)
- John Human (1934)
- Mandy Mitchell-Innes (1934–1937)
- Roger Winlaw (1934)
- Roger Human (1934)
- Dick Moore (1934–1938)
- Cecil Paris (1935)
- Cecil Maxwell (1935–1937)
- George Heane (1935–1947)
- Howard Lawson (1935)
- Hugh Bartlett (1935–1939)
- John Cameron (1935)
- Reginald Hewetson (1935)
- Sandy Singleton (1936–1946)
- Gerry Chalk (1936–1939)
- John Stephenson (1936–1939)
- Mark Tindall (1936)
- Norman Partridge (1936)
- Roger Kimpton (1936–1937)
- Tom Pearce (1936–1948)
- Stewie Dempster (1937)
- David Macindoe (1937)
- Norman Yardley (1937–1955)
- Basil Allen (1938)
- Paul Gibb (1938)
- Billy Griffith (1938–1951)
- Wally Hammond (1938–1946)
- John Brocklebank (1939)
- Tony Mallett (1946–1947)
- Barry Trapnell (1946)
- Charles Knott (1946–1950)
- Jack Davies (1946)
- John Bartlett (1946)
- Martin Donnelly (1946–1948)
- Bill Edrich (1947–1957)
- Guy Willatt (1947–1952)
- Tony Pawson (1947)
- John Cheetham (1947)
- Ken Cranston (1947–1948)
- Reg Simpson (1947–1956)
- Trevor Bailey (1947–1962)
- Wilf Wooller (1947–1953)
- Charles Palmer (1948–1956)
- George Mann (1948–1949)
- John Dewes (1948–1950)
- Philip Whitcombe (1948)
- Abdul Hafeez Kardar (1949)
- Clive van Ryneveld (1949)
- Hubert Doggart (1949–1951)
- Donald Carr (1950–1961)
- Doug Insole (1950–1960)
- Don Brennan (1950–1953)
- John Warr (1950–1960)

== 1951 to 1962 ==
- Colin Cowdrey (1951–1960)
- David Sheppard (1951–1962)
- Nigel Howard (1951)
- Peter May (1951–1961)
- Robin Marlar (1951–1958)
- Buck Divecha (1951)
- Tom Hall (1951)
- Billy Sutcliffe (1951–1957)
- Cuan McCarthy (1952)
- Stuart Surridge (1953–1955)
- Ben Barnett (1954–1955)
- Esmond Lewis (1954–1957)
- Gamini Goonesena (1954–1958)
- Gerry Tordoff (1955)
- John Pretlove (1955–1956)
- Jonathan Fellows-Smith (1955)
- M. J. K. Smith (1955–1962)
- Peter Richardson (1955–1958)
- Chris Walton (1956–1957)
- C. C. P. Williams (1956)
- Jimmy Allan (1956)
- Michael Melluish (1956–1957)
- Swaranjit Singh (1956)
- Colin Stansfield Smith (1957)
- Ted Dexter (1957–1962)
- Colin Ingleby-Mackenzie (1958–1960)
- Dennis Silk (1958–1960)
- Eric Petrie (1958)
- J. A. Bailey (1958)
- Ossie Wheatley (1958–1962)
- Raman Subba Row (1958–1960)
- Alan Hurd (1959–1960)
- Bob Barber (1959–1962)
- Christopher Howland (1959)
- Charles Robins (1959)
- David Kirby (1959–1962)
- David Sayer (1959–1960)
- William Richardson (1959–1962)
- Jimmy Brown (1959–1960)
- Ronnie Burnet (1959)
- Andrew Corran (1960)
- A. C. Smith (1960–1962)
- Tom Pugh (1960)
- Roger Prideaux (1960–1962)
- Abbas Ali Baig (1961)
- Colin Drybrough (1961–1962)
- Edward Craig (1961–1962)
- Dan Piachaud (1961)
- Mike Brearley (1961)
- David Pithey (1962)
- Ray White (1962)
- Richard Jefferson (1962)
- Richard Hutton (1962)
- Tony Lewis (1962)

== See also ==
- List of Gentlemen v Players matches
- List of Gentlemen cricketers (1806–1840)
- List of Players cricketers (1806–1840)
- List of Players cricketers (1841–1962)
