= List of Sussex cricket captains =

Sussex has been a prominent cricket county since the 17th century and teams representing the county have generally been regarded as important or first-class. The earliest known move towards a permanent county organisation happened 17 June 1836 when a meeting in Brighton established a Sussex Cricket Fund to support county matches. It was from this organisation that Sussex County Cricket Club was formally constituted on 1 March 1839. The club played its initial first-class match against Marylebone Cricket Club at Lord's on 10 & 11 June 1839. Sussex CCC is England's oldest county club, one of eighteen that play in the County Championship at first-class level. The player appointed club captain leads the team in all fixtures, except if unavailable, and the following 48 cricketers have held the post since formation of the county club in 1839.

== Club captains ==
- C. G. Taylor 1839–1846
- E. Napper 1847–1862
- J. H. Hale 1863
- C. H. Smith 1864–1874
- J. M. Cotterill 1874–1875
- F. F. J. Greenfield 1876–1878, 1881–1882
- C. Sharp 1879
- R. T. Ellis 1880
- H. Whitfeld 1883–1884
- G. N. Wyatt 1885
- F. M. Lucas 1886
- C. A. Smith 1887–1888, 1890
- W. Newham 1889, 1891–1892
- W. L. Murdoch 1893–1899
- K. S. Ranjitsinhji 1899–1903
- C. B. Fry 1904–1906, 1907–1908
- C. L. A. Smith 1906, 1909
- H. P. Chaplin 1910–1914
- H. L. Wilson 1919–1921
- A. E. R. Gilligan 1922–1929
- A. H. H. Gilligan 1930
- K. S. Duleepsinhji 1931–1932
- R. S. G. Scott 1933
- A. Melville 1934–1935
- A. J. Holmes 1936–1939
- S. C. Griffith 1946
- H. T. Bartlett 1947–1949
- J. Langridge 1950–1952
- D. S. Sheppard 1953
- G. H. G. Doggart 1954
- R. G. Marlar 1955–1959
- E. R. Dexter 1960–1965
- The 9th Nawab of Pataudi 1966
- J. M. Parks 1967–1968
- M. G. Griffith 1968–1972
- A. W. Greig 1973–1977
- A. Long 1978–1980
- J. R. T. Barclay 1981–1986
- I. J. Gould 1987
- P. W. G. Parker 1988–1991
- A. P. Wells 1992–1996
- P. Moores 1997
- C. J. Adams 1998–2008
- M. H. Yardy 2009–2012
- E. C. Joyce 2013-2015
- L.J. Wright 2016-2017
- B.C. Brown 2017-2021
- T.M. Head 2022
- T.J. Haines 2022
- C.A. Pujara 2022-2023
- J.A. Simpson 2024 to present

== Sussex-born captains ==
Eight Sussex-born players have captained the club in first-class cricket, as follows:

- C. H. Smith (born Henfield) 1864–1874
- C. L. A. Smith (born Henfield) 1906, 1909
- J. Langridge (born Newick) 1950–1952
- R. G. Marlar (born Eastbourne) 1955–1959
- J. M. Parks (born Haywards Heath) 1967–1968
- A. P. Wells (born Newhaven) 1992–1996
- B.C. Brown (born Cuckfield) 2017-2021
- T. J. Haines (born Crawley) 2022

== See also ==
- List of Sussex CCC players

== Sources ==
- John Wallace, 100 Greats – Sussex County Cricket Club, Tempus, 2002
