= Arthur Smith (cricketer, born 1851) =

English cricketer

Personal information
- Full name: Arthur Smith
- Born: 28 May 1851; Hurstpierpoint, Sussex, England
- Died: 8 March 1923 (aged 71); Amberley, Sussex, England
- Batting: Right-handed
- Bowling: Left-arm roundarm slow-medium
- Relatives: Charles Smith (brother); Charles Smith (nephew); Alfred Smith (uncle)

Domestic team information
- Years: Team
- 1874–1880: Sussex

Career statistics
Competition	First-class
Matches	19
Runs scored	94
Batting average	4.27
100s/50s	–/–
Top score	13
Balls bowled	2,830
Wickets	61
Bowling average	17.80
5 wickets in innings	3
10 wickets in match	1
Best bowling	7/47
Catches/stumpings	7/–
- Source: Cricinfo, 26 February 2012

Arthur Smith (28 May 1851 – 8 March 1923) was an English cricketer. Smith was a right-handed batsman who bowled left-arm roundarm slow-medium. He was born at Hurstpierpoint, Sussex.

Smith made his first-class debut for Sussex against Yorkshire in 1874 at the County Ground, Hove. He made eighteen further first-class appearances for Sussex, the last of which came against Surrey in 1880. Smith's role in a team was a bowler, in his nineteen first-class matches for Sussex he took 61 wickets at an average of 17.80, with best figures of 7/47. These figures were one of three five wicket hauls he took and came against Surrey in 1876, a match in which he also took figures of 5/77 to claim his only haul of ten wickets in a match. With the bat, he scored 94 runs at an average of 4.27, with a high score of 13.

He died at Amberley, Sussex, on 8 March 1923. His brother, Charles, and nephew, also called Charles, played first-class cricket, as did his uncle Alfred Smith.
