= William Hammersley =

Australian cricketer and journalist (1826–1886)

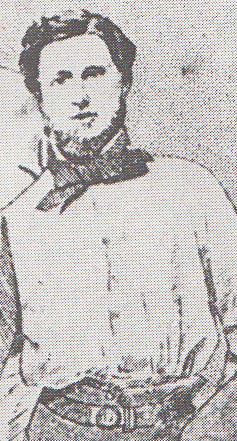
Hammersley, 1859

William Josiah Sumner Hammersley (25 September 1826 – 15 November 1886) was an English-born first-class cricketer and sports journalist in Victoria, Australia, one of the four men credited with setting down the original rules of Australian rules football.

== Life ==
Hammersley (1826-1886) was born on 25 September 1826 at Ash, Surrey, England to father William Josiah Hammersley of England.

Hammersley was educated at Aldenham School and at a private school in Billericay. He matriculated at Trinity College, Cambridge, but did not graduate with a degree.

During his teens he was a prominent cricketer having debuted at Lord's on 10 June 1847 as a batsman for Cambridge. He was also a prominent shooter and footracer.

Hammersley migrated to Australia in 1856. Upon his arrival in Melbourne he became a member of the Melbourne Cricket Club. He first represented the colony of Victoria against New South Wales in the intercolonial cricked match at the Domain in January 1857 and was a regular member of the Victorian side until 1861.

He worked as a sports journalist for Bell's Life in Victoria and later The Australasian, where he was sporting editor until 1882, writing on cricket under the pen-name of "Longstop".

He died on 15 November 1886 in the Melbourne suburb of Fitzroy and was buried in the Melbourne General Cemetery.

== Cricketer ==
Hammersley was a prominent cricketer, a right-handed batsman and right-arm round-arm bowler, playing for Cambridge University Cricket Club, Surrey County Cricket Club and Marylebone Cricket Club. Bowling for the MCC against Surrey in a match on 15 June 1848, he achieved a hat-trick with successive dismissals of Edmund Reeves, Nicholas Felix, and Charles Coltson.

He captained the first Victorian XI to visit Sydney for an inter-colonial match in 1857 and played a few more matches until 1861. He was the first person to use the term "test match" to describe important international matches, which he did during the English cricket team's tour of Australia in 1861-62.

== Australian rules football ==
He was a personal friend of fellow Cambridge cricketer Thomas Wentworth Wills and helped to give momentum to Wills's calls to form a football club. In 1859 he became a founding member of the Melbourne Football Club and involved in popularising the club's football code. Hammersley was a prominent Melbourne FC player until 1864 however and continued to serve on the club's committee and umpire for many years until as late as 1879.

Hammersley is also believed by some to have been instrumental in introducing Australian Rules to Sydney and in the early formation of the New South Wales Football Association.

== Family ==
Hammersley married Jane Thirkettle in London on 23 September 1849. They had four children, a son and three daughters. Hammersley reportedly did not see them after emigrating to Australia.

In the English Census of 1851, Hammersley and his wife Jane lived in Regents Park, London, with their 8-month-old son, also William J. Hammersley gave his occupation as 'studying for the church'. By the 1861 Census, Jane was living, without William, in Hampton Wick, on the outskirts of London, with the couple's four children. Jane described herself as an 'annuitant', and had a live-in servant.
