= Frank Buckland =

Frank Buckland may refer to:

- Frank Buckland (ice hockey) (1902–1991), Canadian ice hockey player
- Francis Trevelyan Buckland (1826–1880), English surgeon and naturalist
- Frank Buckland (politician) (1847–1915), New Zealand member of parliament and cricketer
- Francis Buckland (cricketer) (1854–1913), English cricketer
