= Edith Lyttleton =

Edith Lyttleton or Lyttelton may refer to:

- Edith Lyttleton (New Zealand writer) (1873–1945), Australasian author
- Dame Edith Lyttelton (1865–1948), British novelist, World War I-era activist and spiritualist
