= Henry Nicholson =

Henry Nicholson may refer to:

- Henry Alleyne Nicholson (1844–1899), British palaeontologist and zoologist
- Henry Nicholson (botanist) (1681–1715/1721), Irish botanist and physician
- Henry Nicholson (Royal Navy officer) (1835–1915)
- H. B. Nicholson (1925–2007), scholar of the Aztecs
- Henry Nicholson (cricketer) (1832–1858), English cricketer

== See also ==
- Nicholson (name)
