= Maurice Hall =

Maurice Hall may refer to:

Fiction

- Maurice Hall, the main character in Maurice (novel)
- Maurice Hall, the main character in Maurice (1987 film)

People

- Maurice Hall, player on the 2002 Ohio State Buckeyes football team and 2003 Ohio State Buckeyes football team
- Maurice Hall, a founder of Jazz Bakery
- Maurice Hall (cricketer)
