= Sandy Allen (cricketer) =

English cricketer

Personal information
- Full name: Alexander Philip Wortley Allen
- Born: 13 October 1984 (age 42); Solihull, Warwickshire
- Batting: Right-handed

Career statistics
Competition	First-class	List A
Matches	1	2
Runs scored	18	15
Batting average	–	7.50
100s/50s	0/0	0/0
Top score	18*	10
Catches/stumpings	0/–	1/–
- Source: CricketArchive, 6 July 2019

Alexander Philip Wortley Allen (born 13 October 1984) is a former first-class cricketer. A wicketkeeper and right-handed batsman, he was born in Solihull, Warwickshire and played one first-class match for Warwickshire County Cricket Club in 2002. He scored an unbeaten 18 and took a catch against West Indies A and also played two List A one-day matches: one for Warwickshire Cricket Board in 2002 and one for Devon in 2005. He also competed in the Minor Counties Championship for Devon from 2005 to 2007. His grandfather, Esmond Lewis, was also a first-class cricketer who played 47 matches for Warwickshire after the Second World War.
