= Charles Smith (cricketer, born 1879) =

English cricketer

Personal information
- Full name: Charles Lawrence Arthur Smith
- Born: 1 January 1879; Henfield, Sussex, England
- Died: 22 November 1949 (aged 70); Wineham, Sussex, England
- Batting: Right-handed
- Bowling: Right-arm medium-fast
- Relatives: Charles Smith (father); Alfred Smith (uncle)

Domestic team information
- Years: Team
- 1898–1911: Sussex

Career statistics
Competition	First-class
Matches	220
Runs scored	5,844
Batting average	19.54
100s/50s	2/23
Top score	103*
Balls bowled	912
Wickets	9
Bowling average	65.00
5 wickets in innings	–
10 wickets in match	–
Best bowling	1/0
Catches/stumpings	148/–
- Source: Cricinfo, 19 June 2022

Charles Lawrence Arthur Smith (1 January 1879 – 22 November 1949) was an English cricketer active from 1898 to 1911 who played for Sussex and was club captain in 1906 and 1909. He was born and died in Henfield. He appeared in 220 first-class matches as a righthanded batsman who bowled right arm medium fast. He scored 5,844 runs with a highest score of 103 not out and took nine wickets with a best performance of one for 0. Smith was the son of Charles Hamlin Smith and a nephew of Arthur Smith.
