= Tottey =

Tottey is a surname. Notable people with the surname include:

- Bill Tottey (1888–1943), Australian rules footballer
- Fred Tottey (1909–1977), Australian rugby league player

== See also ==
- Ottey
