= Mike Griffith (cricketer) =

English cricketer

Personal information
- Full name: Mike Grenville Griffith
- Born: 25 November 1943 (age 82); Beaconsfield, Buckinghamshire
- Batting: Right-handed
- Role: Wicket-keeper
- Relatives: Billy Griffith (father); Billy Mead (great-nephew)

Domestic team information
- Years: Team
- 1962–1974: Sussex
- 1963–1965: Cambridge University
- FC debut: 15 August 1962 Sussex v Surrey
- Last FC: 28 August 1974 Sussex v Pakistanis
- LA debut: 5 September 1964 Sussex v Warwickshire
- Last LA: 25 August 1974 Sussex v Leicestershire

Career statistics
Competition	First-class	List A
Matches	276	122
Runs scored	8,889	1,693
Batting average	24.35	20.64
100s/50s	5/42	0/1
Top score	158	61
Balls bowled	78	–
Wickets	1	–
Bowling average	28	–
5 wickets in innings	0	–
10 wickets in match	0	–
Best bowling	1/4	–
Catches/stumpings	269/20	56/1
- Source: CricketArchive, 7 May 2022

Mike Grenville Griffith, (born 25 November 1943) is a former English first-class cricketer, who played for and captained Sussex County Cricket Club. A middle-order right-handed batsman, he also kept wicket occasionally.

Griffith was born at Beaconsfield, Buckinghamshire, the son of the Sussex and England wicket-keeper and cricket administrator Billy Griffith. He was educated at Ludgrove School followed by Marlborough College and Magdalene College, Cambridge. He played first for Sussex in 1962, then for Cambridge University for three years from 1963, winning his blue all three years. In 1968 he succeeded Jim Parks as county captain during the season, and continued as captain until 1972. He stood down from the captaincy after 1972.

Griffith took part in several lesser cricket tours, none of them including representative cricket. He also played frequently for the Marylebone Cricket Club (MCC) sides. He was the President of MCC for 2012–3.

An all-round sportsman, he played hockey for both Cambridge University Great Britain and England and also won a Blue for rackets.

Sporting positions
Preceded by J. M. Parks	Sussex county cricket captain 1968–1972	Succeeded by Tony Greig
