= Billy Mead =

English cricketer (born 1999)

Personal information
- Full name: Sebastian William Mead
- Born: 3 February 1999 (age 27); Winchester, Hampshire, England
- Batting: Right-handed
- Role: Wicket-keeper
- Relatives: Billy Griffith (great-grandfather); Mike Griffith (great-uncle)

Domestic team information
- Years: Team
- 2022: Kent
- 2023: Berkshire
- Only FC: 6 May 2022 Kent v Sri Lanka Development XI

Career statistics
Competition	First-class
Matches	1
Runs scored	106
Batting average	–
100s/50s	1/0
Top score	106*
Catches/stumpings	1/0
- Source: Cricinfo, 7 May 2022

Sebastian William Mead (born 3 February 1999) is an English cricketer who made his first-class cricket debut for Kent County Cricket Club in May 2022. Mead is a right-handed batter who typically plays as a wicket-keeper.

Mead was born at Winchester in Hampshire, grew up at Longparish, and was educated at Marlborough College on a sport scholarship. He played cricket for the school XI for five years, captaining the college in 2017 when he scored 1,009 runs during the season, including a Marlborough record 214 not out, (Note: The record Mead broke had stood for 82 years. It was beaten the following year by Harry Cowling who scored 215 not out for a Marlborough age-group team. Mead's score remains the highest score for the college's First XI.) and was considered a candidate for the honour of Wisden's Schools Cricketer of the Year. His great-uncle Mike Griffith, who had been the last cricketer to score 1,000 runs in a season for Marlborough in 1961, played more than 350 matches for Sussex County Cricket Club and was an England and Great Britain hockey international, whilst his great-grandfather Billy Griffith played three Test matches for England and captained Sussex. Mead also played rackets at school, winning the under-18 Renny Cup championship at Queen's Club in 2016.

Mead made his debut for Kent in May 2022 in a first-class match against a Sri Lanka Development XI. He scored a century on debut, making 106 not out to become the 14th player to score a century for Kent on their debut first-class appearance for the club and the seventh to do so in their first first-class match. He had played age-group cricket for Hampshire teams and Second XI cricket for Hampshire, Somerset, Surrey and Warwickshire before impressing for Kent's Second XI at the start of the 2022 season. He also played for MCC Young Cricketers in the Second XI Championship in 2018 and 2019 and for Cape Town Cricket Club in the 2017/18 South African club season, spending two northern winters at Gary Kirsten's cricket academy in Cape Town.

During the 2023 cricket season Mead played for Berkshire County Cricket Club in the National Counties Championship. He made Second XI appearances for Somerset, Sussex and Derbyshire.
