= Robert Ellis (cricketer) =

English cricketer

Personal information
- Full name: Robert Thomas Ellis
- Born: 16 September 1853; Burgess Hill, Sussex, England
- Died: 23 September 1937 (aged 84); Stone, Dartford, Kent, England
- Batting: Right-handed
- Bowling: Right-arm fast

Domestic team information
- Years: Team
- 1877–1886: Sussex
- FC debut: 27 August 1877 Sussex v Gloucestershire
- Last FC: 31 May 1886 Sussex v Nottinghamshire

Career statistics
| Competition | First-class |
|---|---|
| Matches | 70 |
| Runs scored | 2,356 |
| Batting average | 18.69 |
| 100s/50s | 2/16 |
| Top score | 103 |
| Balls bowled | 164 |
| Wickets | 0 |
| Bowling average | – |
| 5 wickets in innings | – |
| 10 wickets in match | – |
| Best bowling | – |
| Catches/stumpings | 28/– |
- Source: CricketArchive, 4 September 2011

Robert Thomas Ellis (16 September 1853 – 23 September 1937) was an English maltster and cricketer who played first-class cricket for Sussex between 1877 and 1889. He captained the team in 1880.

Ellis was born at Franklands, Keymer near Burgess Hill, Sussex, He was educated at Brighton College and played in the first XI in 1869. He became a maltster. He made his first-class cricket debut for Sussex in the 1877 season. In 1880 he was captain and manager of Sussex and scored a century against Surrey. He was staying with his brother Philip who was a farmer at Rodmell in 1881. In 1881 he scored a century against Derbyshire. Also in 1881 he played matches for South against North, Gentlemen against Players and for Lord Sheffield's XI. He played no matches in 1883 and appeared for Gentlemen of the South in 1885. He played his last three games in the 1886 season.

Ellis was a right-handed batsman and played 144 innings in 70 first-class matches with an average of 18.69 and a top score of 103. He was a right-arm round arm bowler and took no wickets in 164 balls for the loss of 69 runs.

Ellis died at Stone, Dartford Kent at the age of 84.

Sporting positions
| Preceded by Charles Sharp | Sussex county cricket captain 1880 | Succeeded by Herbert Whitfield |
