= Richard Lewis (Middlesex cricketer) =

English cricketer

Lieutenant Colonel Richard Percy Lewis (10 March 1874 – 7 September 1917) was an English cricketer active 1891–1907 who played for Middlesex, Oxford University and Marylebone Cricket Club (MCC). He was born in Kensington and died on active World War I service at Zonnebeke, West Flanders, Belgium.

Lewis was educated at Winchester College and University College, Oxford. After leaving Oxford he was briefly editor of the London Review, but at the outbreak of the South African War he joined the army. He served in South Africa during the Second Boer War and was commissioned in the Devonshire Regiment in October 1900. He transferred to the King's African Rifles in 1904, then to the Egyptian Army in 1908.

After the outbreak of World War I he transferred to the Manchester Regiment and held the rank of lieutenant colonel commanding the 10th (Territorial Force) Battalion of his regiment when he was killed.
