= Archibald Balfour =

English cricketer

Personal information
- Full name: Archibald Balfour
- Born: 16 July 1840; Marylebone, Middlesex, England
- Died: 29 October 1922 (aged 82); Chelsea, London, England
- Batting: Unknown
- Relatives: Edith Lyttelton (daughter); Edward Balfour (brother); Robert Balfour (brother); Alfred Lyttelton (son-in-law)

Domestic team information
- Years: Team
- 1862: Marylebone Cricket Club

Career statistics
Competition	First-class
Matches	3
Runs scored	16
Batting average	3.20
100s/50s	–/–
Top score	5
Catches/stumpings	3/–
- Source: Cricinfo, 1 September 2021

Archibald Balfour (16 July 1840 – 29 October 1922) was an English first-class cricketer.

The son of Charles Balfour, he was born at Marylebone in July 1840. He was educated at Westminster School, leaving in 1859 and being appointed a clerk in The Admiralty. Balfour later played first-class cricket for the Marylebone Cricket Club against Sussex at Lord's in 1862. He also made two first-class appearances for the Gentlemen of the Marylebone Cricket Club against the Gentlemen of Kent in the Canterbury Cricket Week's of 1862 and 1863. Balfour struggled in his three first-class matches, scoring 16 runs in these matches, with a highest score 5. Balfour later left the admiralty and became a merchant, like his father. He was a merchant in the Russian Empire at Saint Petersburg, where he was resident for many years. Balfour later returned to England, where he died at Chelsea in October 1922. His daughter was Edith Lyttelton, the novelist, playwright, World War I-era activist and spiritualist, who was born in Saint Petersburg in 1865. His son was Reginald Balfour (1875-1907), Fellow of King's College, Cambridge, and a civil servant in educational administration. His brothers were Edward and Robert, who were both first-class cricketers.
