= George Ottey =

English clergyman, educationalist, and cricketer

George Philip Ottey (9 October 1824 – 17 December 1891) was an English clergyman and educationalist and a cricketer who played first-class cricket for Cambridge University from 1844 to 1847. He was born at Southfleet in Kent and died at Bournemouth, then in Hampshire, now in Dorset.

== Career ==
Ottey was educated at Rugby School and at St John's College, Cambridge. In cricket he had success as a bowler and his batting figures are not impressive by modern standards; in a few matches, however, he opened the batting. It is not known if he batted or bowled right- or left-handed. He played in several of Cambridge University's first-class games in the 1844, 1845 and 1846 seasons, appearing in the University Match against Oxford University each year, and reappeared in 1847 for a fourth University Match, though that was his only game of that season. He twice took six wickets in an innings, though the full scorecards for most of his games are not available. In his final University Match of 1847, his last game of first-class cricket, he shared all 20 Oxford wickets with John Lee, each taking 10 in the match.

Ottey graduated from Cambridge University with a Bachelor of Arts degree in 1847 and was ordained as a Church of England priest. He served as curate in parishes in Worcester, Lewisham and Whitechapel, and from 1871 to 1886 he was the inspector of schools for the Diocese of London and, from 1876, prebendary of St Paul's Cathedral; from 1886 until he retired in 1889 he was rector of Much Hadham in Hertfordshire.

Ottey was an author. His books included an 1867 volume called The Dragon Bound and Loosed which debates whether the Millennium might have begun between A.D. 789 and 867, and would therefore end no later than 1867. Later works included scripted lessons for Sunday School teachers.
