= Hertfordshire County Cricket Club =

English cricket team

Team information
- Founded: 1876
- Home ground: Balls Park

History
- MCCC wins: 4
- MCCAT wins: 1
- FP Trophy wins: 0
- Official website: Hertfordshire County Cricket Club

Hertfordshire County Cricket Club is one of twenty minor county clubs within the domestic cricket structure of England and Wales. It represents the historic county of Hertfordshire.

The team is currently a member of the Minor Counties Championship Eastern Division and plays in the MCCA Knockout Trophy. Hertfordshire played List A matches occasionally from 1964 until 2004 but is not classified as a List A team per se.

The club is based at Balls Park, Hertford and also plays matches around the county at Cricket Field Lane in Bishop's Stortford, Long Marston, Brunton Memorial Ground in Radlett and North Mymms.

== Honours ==
- Minor Counties Championship (4) - 1936, 1975, 1983, 1990; shared (0) -
- MCCA Knockout Trophy (1) - 1984

== Earliest cricket ==
Cricket must have reached Hertfordshire by the end of the 17th century. The earliest reference to cricket in the county is dated 1732 and is also the earliest reference to Essex as a county team. On Thursday 6 July 1732, a team called Essex & Hertfordshire played London Cricket Club at Epping Forest "for £50 a side". The result is unknown.

Hertfordshire was never considered a first-class county but its teams did appear frequently throughout the 18th century and played against some teams that were normally considered first-class, so there must have been times when the status of a Hertfordshire match was "borderline".

On 22 June 1814, Hertfordshire played against the Marylebone Cricket Club in the first match to be staged on the current Lord's ground. This fixture was repeated in 2014 to mark the bicentennial of the ground.

== Origin of club ==
There were a number of county organisations in the 18th century and one in 1838. The present Hertfordshire CCC was founded on 8 March 1876. It joined the Minor Counties Championship for the first season, 1895, and is the only one of the seven competing sides from that season to have maintained membership continuously ever since.

== Club history ==
Hertfordshire has won the Minor Counties Championship four times, in 1936, 1975, 1983 and 1990.

Hertfordshire has won the MCCA Knockout Trophy once since its inception in 1983. It won in 1984.

== Notable players ==
The following Hertfordshire cricketers also made an impact on the first-class game:

- John Carr, sometime Middlesex player and son of Donald Carr
- Bill Coleman, 619 wickets in minor counties cricket
- Jonathan Fellows-Smith, South African Test cricketer
- Ian MacLaurin, Baron MacLaurin of Knebworth, businessman and head of the England and Wales Cricket Board
- Jack Meyer, later Millfield School headmaster and captain of Somerset CCC
- Trevor Morley
- Gerald Smithson, Yorkshire, Leicestershire and England Test cricketer
- George Brooksbank, business executive
- Joseph (Joe) Thorley, played for Gentlemen v Players in 1925 in same team as the Gilligans & Wally Hammond. Captained Herts CCC.
- Steven Finn (born 4 April 1989). He is a right-arm fast bowler who at the age of 16 became Middlesex County Cricket Club's youngest-ever debutant in first-class cricket. He made his England Test debut in 2010 against Bangladesh. He has a bowling strike rate of around 50, one of the best for England bowlers.
- Mark Ilott was the county's youngest debutant aged 16 before going on to open the bowling for Essex for 15 years. He was also capped for England, playing against Australia and South Africa.

== Bibliography ==
- ACS (1981). A Guide to Important Cricket Matches Played in the British Isles 1709 – 1863. Nottingham: ACS.
- Barclays (1986). Swanton, E. W. (ed.). Barclays World of Cricket. Willow Books. ISBN 0-00-218193-2.
- Birley, Derek (1999). A Social History of English Cricket. Aurum. ISBN 1-85410-710-0.
- Bowen, Rowland (1970). Cricket: A History of its Growth and Development. Eyre & Spottiswoode.
- Buckley, G. B. (1935). Fresh Light on 18th Century Cricket. Cotterell.
- Playfair Cricket Annual – various editions
- Wisden Cricketers' Almanack – various editions
