= John Langridge (cricketer) =

English cricketer (1910–1999)

Personal information
- Full name: John George Langridge
- Born: 10 February 1910; Chailey, Sussex, England
- Died: 27 June 1999 (aged 89); Eastbourne, Sussex, England
- Batting: Right-handed
- Bowling: Right-arm medium pace
- Role: Batter, umpire
- Relatives: Brother, James; nephew, Richard

Domestic team information
- Years: Team
- 1928–1955: Sussex

Umpiring information
- Tests umpired: 7 (1960–1963)
- ODIs umpired: 8 (1975–1979)
- FC umpired: 557 (1956–1983)
- LA umpired: 219 (1963–1983)

Career statistics
Competition	First-class
Matches	574
Runs scored	34,378
Batting average	37.44
100s/50s	76/152
Top score	250*
Balls bowled	3,390
Wickets	44
Bowling average	42.00
5 wickets in innings	–
10 wickets in match	–
Best bowling	3/15
Catches/stumpings	788/–
- Source: CricketArchive, 19 November 2024

John George Langridge MBE (10 February 1910 – 27 June 1999) was a cricketer who played for Sussex and later became a first-class umpire. His obituary in Wisden called him "one of the best English cricketers of the 20th century never to play a Test match".

Born into a cricketing family at Newick, north of Lewes, John Langridge followed his elder brother James into the Sussex side in 1928 and stayed there until he retired in 1955. In between, he scored more than 34,000 runs as an opening batsman and made 76 centuries, and was a Wisden Cricketer of the Year in 1950. Considered unlucky not to have earned a place in the national team, only Alan Jones of Glamorgan has scored more runs but not played for his country, and no one who scored as many centuries as Langridge failed to win international recognition. In addition, Langridge took 788 catches, mostly at slip, including 69 in his last season at the age of 45; only five players have taken more catches in a career or in a season.

Langridge became a first-class umpire on retirement and stood in seven Test matches and eight One Day Internationals. He was appointed an MBE for services to cricket.

== See also ==
- List of Test cricket umpires
- List of One Day International cricket umpires
