= Ottey =

Ottey is a surname. Notable people with the name include:

- Allan Ottey (born 1992), Jamaican footballer
- George Ottey (1824–1891), English clergyman, educationalist and cricketer
- Merlene Ottey (born 1960), Jamaican-Slovenian sprinter
- Milton Ottey (born 1959), Jamaican-Canadian high jumper
