= Richard Langridge =

English cricketer

Personal information
- Full name: Richard James Langridge
- Born: 13 April 1939; Brighton, Sussex, England
- Died: 3 January 2005 (aged 65); Chichester, Sussex, England
- Batting: Left-handed
- Bowling: Right-arm off-break
- Relatives: James Langridge (father); John Langridge (uncle)

Career statistics
Competition	First-class	List A
Matches	212	31
Runs scored	8310	501
Batting average	22.89	18.55
100s/50s	5/42	0/2
Top score	137*	74
Balls bowled	99	–
Wickets	0	–
Bowling average	–	–
5 wickets in innings	0	–
10 wickets in match	0	–
Best bowling	–	–
Catches/stumpings	189/0	16/0
- Source: Cricinfo, 9 September 2022

Richard James Langridge (13 April 1939 – 3 January 2005) was an English first-class cricketer who played for Sussex from 1957 to 1971. He was the son of the English Test cricketer James Langridge, who also played for Sussex.

Langridge was a tall left-handed opening batsman who had particular success in the early 1960s, making 1675 runs in 1961 followed by 1885 runs in 1962. He made the highest of his five first-class centuries against Leicestershire in 1963, when he carried his bat for 137 not out in a Sussex total of 222.
