= Edward McNiven =

English lawyer and cricketer

Edward McNiven (21 June 1827 – 4 January 1858) was an English lawyer and cricketer who played first-class cricket for Cambridge University, Surrey and various amateur sides between 1846 and 1851. He was born at Offley, Hertfordshire and died near Godstone, Surrey.

McNiven was educated at Eton College and at Trinity College, Cambridge. At Eton, he played in the Eton v Harrow cricket matches of 1843 and 1844 primarily as a bowler. Between 1846 and 1848, he appeared in several matches for Cambridge University, playing largely as a right-handed lower middle-order batsman; he played in the 1846 University Match against Oxford University but was not picked for the matches in 1847 or 1848. His best batting came in a match against a side calling itself "Cambridge Townsmen" in 1848, when he was unbeaten on 88 when the university innings ended. McNiven did not play any first-class cricket in 1849 or in 1850, the year he graduated from Cambridge University, but in 1851 he played four games inside a month for four teams: the Marylebone Cricket Club, Surrey, the Gentlemen in the annual Lord's Gentlemen v Players fixture, and the Gentlemen of England team. Those were his final appearances in senior cricket.

McNiven became a lawyer and was admitted to the Inner Temple in 1849. He was killed "near Westerham" when his dog cart overturned in January 1858; the family home at the time was Perrysfield, near Godstone, and in some references this is given as the place of death.
