= Straton Campbell =

English cricketer

Personal information
- Full name: Straton Charles Campbell
- Born: 26 August 1823; Little Dumham, Norfolk
- Died: 14 March 1904 (aged 80); Weasenham, Norfolk
- Source: Cricinfo, 15 April 2017

Straton Charles Campbell (26 August 1823 – 14 March 1904) was an English cricketer and clergyman. He played four first-class matches for the Gentlemen and for Cambridge University Cricket Club between 1844 and 1845.

The son of the rector of Weasenham, Norfolk, Campbell was educated at King Edward VI School, Bury St Edmunds and at Corpus Christi College, Cambridge. As a cricketer, he was an opening batsman, though it is not known if he batted right- or left-handed. His first important cricket match was the Gentlemen v Players game at Lord's in 1844; in 1845, he played three times for the Cambridge University team, and won a Blue by appearing in the University Match against Oxford University when, with scores of 11 and 22 not out, he was the only player on either side to reach double figures in both innings.

Campbell graduated from Cambridge University in 1846 with a Bachelor of Arts degree. He was ordained as a Church of England deacon in 1847 and as a priest the following year; after a brief curacy at Gateshead Fell in County Durham, he became vicar of Cockley Cley in Norfolk in 1850 and then succeeded his father as the vicar of Weasenham in 1878, coupling that post with the parish of St Peter, Swaffham.

== See also ==
- List of Cambridge University Cricket Club players
