= George Langdon =

English cricketer

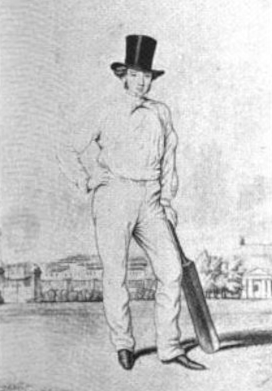

Personal information
- Full name: George Leopold Langdon
- Born: 11 February 1818; Winchester, Hampshire, England
- Died: 2 January 1894 (aged 75); St Paul's Cray, Kent, England
- Batting: Left-handed

Domestic team information
- Years: Team
- 1839: Marylebone Cricket Club
- 1839–1842: Sussex

George Leopold Langdon (11 February 1818 – 2 January 1894) was an English cricketer. Langdon was a left-handed batsman. He was born at Winchester, Hampshire.

Langdon made his debut for Sussex against the Marylebone Cricket Club at Lord's Cricket Ground on 10 June 1839, in what was Sussex County Cricket Club's inaugural match. Making the majority of his career appearances in 1839, he appeared in four further matches for Sussex in that season. He also appearance twice for the Marylebone Cricket Club in that season, as well as once for the Gentlemen of Sussex against the Marylebone Cricket Club, as well as appearing once for a combined Sussex and Nottinghamshire team against England. He appeared in two matches for Sussex in 1840 against England and Nottinghamshire, as well as appearing for England against Kent. The following season he made two appearances for the Gentlemen against the Players, as well as a single match for Sussex against the Marylebone Cricket Club. In total, he made fifteen appearances, eight of which came for Sussex. He scored 130 runs for the county, at an average of 9.28 and with a high score of 38. Overall, he scored 224 runs at an average of 8.00, with a high score of 38.

Outside of cricket, he was an Anglican priest, with his final parish being St Paul's Cray, Kent, where he died on 2 January 1894.
