= Cyril Staples =

Australian-born English cricketer

Personal information
- Full name: Cyril Vernon Grey Staples
- Born: 30 September 1876; Ballarat, Victoria, Australia
- Died: 21 May 1936 (aged 59); Beaumount Hill, Jersey
- Batting: Unknown
- Role: Wicket-keeper

Career statistics
Competition	First-class
Matches	4
Runs scored	35
Batting average	8.75
100s/50s	–/–
Top score	14
Catches/stumpings	4/3
- Source: Cricinfo, 6 August 2019

Cyril Vernon Grey Staples (30 September 1876 – 21 May 1936) was an Australian-born English first-class cricketer.

Staples was born at Ballarat in Victoria in September 1876. By 1900, he had moved to London to work as a stockbroker, where he married Ethel Amelia Stewart in July 1900. He made his debut in first-class cricket for W. G. Grace's XI against Cambridge University at Fenner's in 1906, before playing for W. G. Grace's XI the following season against Surrey at The Oval. He made two final appearances in first-class cricket in 1908, appearing for the Gentlemen of England against Surrey, and for the Gentlemen in the Gentlemen v Players fixture. Playing as a wicket-keeper, he scored 35 runs in his four first-class matches, as well as taking four catches and making three stumpings. He died at Beaumount Hill in Jersey in May 1936.
