= Edith Lyttelton =

British author (1865–1948)

Dame Edith Lyttelton GBE JP
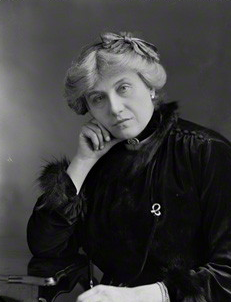
- Born: Edith Sophy Balfour; 4 April 1865; Saint Petersburg, Russian Empire
- Died: 2 September 1948 (aged 83); Westminster, London
- Occupations: Novelist, playwright, activist, spiritualist
- Spouse: Hon. Alfred Lyttelton (m. 1892; died 1913)
- Children: 3, including Oliver Lyttelton, 1st Viscount Chandos
- Parent(s): Archibald Balfour; Sophia Weguelin

Dame Edith Sophy Lyttelton GBE JP (née Balfour; 4 April 1865 – 2 September 1948) was a British novelist, playwright, World War I-era activist and spiritualist.

== Biography ==
Lyttelton was born in Saint Petersburg, the eldest daughter of Archibald Balfour, a London businessman and merchant in the Russian Empire, and Sophia "Sophy" Weguelin, daughter of MP Thomas Matthias Weguelin. Edith was educated privately and moved in the aristocratic circle of friends known as "the Souls", which included A. J. Balfour, George Curzon, Margot Tennant (later Asquith), and Alfred Lyttelton, whom she married. Together they had two surviving children, including Oliver Lyttelton (later 1st Viscount Chandos).

== Activism ==
During their visit to South Africa in 1900, Lyttelton developed a high regard for Alfred Milner, 1st Viscount Milner, and helped establish the Victoria League in 1901 with Violet Markham and Violet Cecil to promote the imperial vision advocated by Milner. The league brought together high-ranking women from different sides of the political divide on the common ground of the empire. She served as its honorary secretary and also supported the Women's Tariff Reform Association.

Lyttelton served on the executive of the National Union of Women Workers (founded in 1895) and as chairwoman of the Personal Service Association (founded in 1908, to alleviate distress caused by unemployment in London). At the outbreak of World War I she was a founder of the War Refugees Committee. She was later made deputy director of the Women's Branch of the Ministry of Agriculture in 1917, served on the Central Committee of Women's Employment from 1916–1925, and as vice-chairman of the Waste Reclamation Trade Board from 1924–1931. She was also the British substitute delegate in Geneva to the League of Nations in 1923, 1926–1928, and 1931. She served on the League's committee on opium smoking in 1928.

== Spiritualism ==
After the death of her husband in 1913, she became interested in spiritualism and was a member, and president from 1933 to 1934, of the council of the Society for Psychical Research. Spiritualism heavily influenced her works, The Faculty of Communion (1925), Our Superconscious Mind (1931), and Some Cases of Prediction (1937), as well as her biography of Florence Upton (1926).

== Writings ==
Lyttelton wrote a novel, The Sinclair Family (1926), an account of her travels in the Far East and India, Travelling Days (1933), and published a biography of her former husband in March 1917. Among her seven plays, two were inspired by her campaign against sweated labour, Warp and Woof and The Thumbscrew.

She also translated Edmond Rostand's Les deux pierrots. She was encouraged by her close friendship with George Bernard Shaw and Mrs. Patrick Campbell. After 1918 she also lobbied for the foundation of a national theatre in London and was a member of the Executive Committee of the Shakespeare Memorial National Theatre.

== Honours ==
In August 1917, Lyttelton was among the first group of people honoured following the creation of the Order of the British Empire by King George V, when she was appointed a Dame Commander of the Order (DBE) for her work with refugees. She and was named Dame Grand Cross of the Order of the British Empire (GBE) in the 1929 New Year Honours, for public services.

== Personal life ==
Balfour married into the Lyttelton family as the second wife of the Hon. Alfred Lyttelton, the eighth son of the fourth Lord Lyttelton. They married at Bordighera on the Italian Riviera on 18 April 1892, six years after the death of his first wife, Octavia Laura Tennant (daughter of Sir Charles Tennant), who had died after only a year of marriage.

They had three children:

- Oliver Lyttelton, 1st Viscount Chandos (15 March 1893 – 21 January 1972)
- Mary Frances Lyttelton (1 July 1895 – 24 October 1982), married in 1928, to Sir George Craik, 2nd Baronet
- Anthony George Lyttelton (3 June 1900 – 17 December 1901)

Widowed in 1913, Edith Lyttelton died in September 1948 at her home in Westminster, age 83.
