= Frederick Lee (cricketer, born 1840) =

English barrister and cricketer

Frederick Lee (11 August 1840 – 13 November 1922) was an English barrister and a cricketer who played first-class cricket for Cambridge University, Surrey and Middlesex, plus other amateur sides, in the 1860s. He was born in Finsbury, London and died at Streatham, also in London.

Lee was educated at Rugby School and at St John's College, Cambridge. He was the fifth son of Henry Lee, a builder from Balham, and among his siblings was a half-brother, John, 15 years older than Frederick, who played cricket for Cambridge University, Surrey and a lot of other amateur sides in the 1840s.

Frederick Lee was a right-handed middle order batsman and a bowler whose bowling style is not known. He played in a couple of first-class cricket matches for Cambridge University in 1860 and was then selected for the University Match against Oxford University at Lord's where, with scores of 16 and 6, he did as well as any batsman in a very low scoring game which Cambridge won narrowly. He played again for Cambridge in 1861 and 1862 but not successfully enough to retain his place in the side for the University Match in either season. Across the 1860s, he played for a variety of teams: Surrey in 1861; the Gentlemen in the Gentlemen v Players matches at The Oval in 1861 and 1862; Middlesex both before and after the formation of the county club; Gentlemen of the South; and Southgate. He was a fairly consistent scorer, but his highest was only 35, which he reached twice in his career; his bowling was occasional and he never took more than two wickets in an innings. His obituary in Wisden Cricketers' Almanack states, under the initials of the editor Sydney Pardon: "Never losing his keen interest in cricket, Mr Lee was a member of the Surrey Committee till nearly the end of his long life, resigning in 1922. He served on the M. C. C. Committee from 1878 to 1882 and again from 1883 to 1887."

Outside cricket, Lee qualified as a lawyer and was called to the bar in 1865, practising on the South Eastern Circuit.
