= Montague Turner =

English cricketer

Montague Turner (21 September 1843 – 25 January 1908) was an English first-class cricketer active 1863–78 who played for Middlesex. He was born in Acton; died in Cuckfield.
