= Joseph Eccles =

English cricketer

Joseph Eccles (13 April 1863 – 2 September 1933) was an English cricketer active from 1886 to 1889 who played for Lancashire. He was born in Accrington and died in Preston. He appeared in 49 first-class matches as a righthanded batsman, scoring 1,802 runs with a highest score of 184, and held 17 catches. He completed two centuries and nine half-centuries in his career.
