= William Napper (English cricketer) =

English cricketer

Personal information
- Full name: William Napper
- Born: 25 August 1816; Wisborough Green, Sussex, England
- Died: 13 July 1897 (aged 80); Brighton, Sussex, England
- Batting: Left-handed
- Bowling: Right-arm roundarm slow
- Relatives: Edwin Napper (brother)

Domestic team information
- Years: Team
- 1842–1860: Sussex

William Napper (24 August 1816 – 13 July 1897) was an English cricketer active in the 1840s and 1850s, making over sixty appearances. Born at Sparr Farm, Wisborough Green, Sussex, Napper was a left-handed batsman and right-arm roundarm slow bowler, who played for several cricket teams.

== Career ==
A travelling club cricketer throughout Sussex, Napper made his debut for Sussex against England in 1842 at Lillywhite's Ground, Brighton. His next appearance in cricket came in 1844 for Petworth against the Marylebone Cricket Club (MCC), while in that same season he played for a team of single players in the Married v Single fixture. In 1845, Napper appeared four times for Sussex, as well as appearing for the Gentlemen in the Gentlemen v Players fixture at the Royal New Ground, Brighton. Two appearances followed for Sussex in 1846, while from 1847 to 1850, Napper made a handful of appearances for the county in each season. Playing one fixture for the county in 1851, two in 1852 and 1853, he again played a handful of fixtures in 1854, as well as making an appearance for the Gentlemen of England against the Gentlemen of Marylebone Cricket Club. Making a second appearance for the Gentlemen of England against the MCC in the following season, Napper also played twice for the Gentlemen of Surrey and Sussex against the Gentlemen of England, and once for the Gentlemen of Kent and Sussex against the same opposition. He played in three fixtures for Sussex in 1857, as well as one for the Gentlemen of Kent and Sussex against the Gentlemen of England, before following that up with two appearances for the county in 1858, and two further final appearances, one in 1859 against Kent, and the other in 1860 against the MCC.

Making a total of 63 appearances in cricket, Napper scored a total of 945 runs at an average of 8.66, with a single half century high score of 67. With the ball, he took a total of 33 wickets at a bowling average of 17.00, with one five wicket haul which gave him best figures of 5/19. The majority of Napper appearances came for Sussex, whom he appeared for 53 times. He scored 730 of his 945 career runs for the county, averaging 8.02, however his highest score came for the Gentlemen of Surrey and Sussex (his highest score for Sussex was 47). His career wickets were shared equally among the teams he represented, with his career best figures also coming for the Gentlemen of Surrey and Sussex.

He died at Brighton, Sussex on 13 July 1897. His brother, Edwin, also played. His father, John Laker Napper, was the owner of a cricket ground at Tisman's House, Rudgwick.
