= Mark Tindall =

English cricketer

Mark Tindall MBE (31 March 1914 – 10 July 1994) was an English first-class cricketer active 1931–38 who played for Middlesex, Marylebone Cricket Club (MCC), Cambridge University and represented the Gentlemen in the Gentlemen v Players series. He was born in Marylebone; died in Eastbourne.
