= James Langridge =

English cricketer

Personal information
- Born: 10 July 1906; Newick, Sussex, England
- Died: 10 September 1966 (aged 60); Brighton, Sussex, England
- Batting: Left-handed
- Bowling: Slow left-arm orthodox
- Relatives: Richard Langridge (son), John Langridge (brother)

International information
- National side: England
- Test debut: 22 July 1933 v West Indies
- Last Test: 17 August 1946 v India

Career statistics
Competition	Test	First-class
Matches	8	695
Runs scored	242	31,716
Batting average	26.88	35.20
100s/50s	0/1	42/181
Top score	70	167
Balls bowled	1,074	89,840
Wickets	19	1,530
Bowling average	21.73	22.56
5 wickets in innings	2	91
10 wickets in match	0	14
Best bowling	7/56	9/34
Catches/stumpings	6/–	380/–
- Source: CricInfo, 1 February 2020

James Langridge (10 July 1906 – 10 September 1966) was an English cricketer who played for Sussex and England. He played in eight Test matches between 1933 and 1946.

Cricket writer Colin Bateman noted: "a great servant of Sussex, Jim Langridge played only one Test after the War in a sporadic England career. As a steady left-handed batsman and patient left-arm spinner, his Test opportunities were greatly limited by the presence of Yorkshire's Hedley Verity".

== Life and career ==
Born in Newick, Sussex, Langridge was an all-rounder who played first-class cricket for almost thirty years. James Langridge – always called by his forename to distinguish him from his younger brother, Sussex opening batsman John Langridge – was a middle-order left-handed batsman and a slow left-arm spin bowler. Initially played by Sussex from 1924 as a batsman, he scored 1,000 runs in an English cricket season twenty times and finished with 31,716 runs and 42 centuries. He ranks as 52nd on the all-time list of run-getters, 11 places behind his own brother.

Langridge developed in the late 1920s as a spin bowler of exceptional accuracy, but lacking in flight. When pitches became treacherous due to rain followed by sunshine, he could be difficult to play and, in six seasons between 1930 and 1937, he took 100 wickets, completing the all-rounder's double of 1,000 runs and 100 wickets each time. He headed Sussex' bowling averages in 1933, 1935, 1937 and 1939, but unaccountably failed as a bowler in the wet summers of 1936 and 1938. In 1937, Langridge scored 2,082 runs and took 102 wickets, a feat achieved only once since (by Trevor Bailey in 1959). In the process he set a record by scoring 2,000 runs in a season with only one century. In all, he took 1,530 wickets, which puts him 77th on the all-time list. His 622 appearances for Sussex are a county record. He also played first-class cricket for Auckland in 1927/28.

Langridge's Test match career amounted to just eight games, spread over thirteen years. On his debut against the West Indies at Old Trafford in 1933, he took seven wickets for 56 runs in the second innings. He was then picked for the 1933–34 Marylebone Cricket Club (MCC) tour to India under Douglas Jardine, where he scored 70 in the Test at Calcutta and took five wickets for 63 runs at Madras. He later made a single appearances in the 1935 series against South Africa, and against India, in both 1936 and 1946. The presence in the England team of left-arm spinner Hedley Verity undoubtedly restricted Langridge's Test opportunities. After Verity's death in the War, Langridge was picked at the age of 40 for the MCC tour of Australia in 1946–47 under Wally Hammond, and was chosen for the Third Test at Melbourne, but had to withdraw after injuring his groin in practice. He never played Test cricket again.

Langridge was captain of Sussex from 1950 to 1952, only the third professional player, after Les Berry of Leicestershire and Tom Dollery of Warwickshire, to be appointed the regular captain of a county club in the 20th century (Ewart Astill captained Leicestershire for a season in 1935, but only because no amateur could be found to do the job). He was one of the Wisden Cricketers of the Year in 1932.

After retirement, he was county coach at Sussex until 1959. His son, Richard, opened the batting for Sussex regularly in the 1960s.

Langridge died in Brighton, Sussex, in September 1966, at the age of 60.

Sporting positions
Preceded by Hugh Bartlett	Sussex county cricket captain 1950–1952	Succeeded by David Sheppard
