= Joseph Thorley =

English cricketer

Personal information
- Full name: Joseph James Thorley
- Born: 7 August 1894; Fernham, Berkshire, England
- Died: 26 December 1962 (aged 68); Marylebone, London, England
- Batting: Right-handed
- Bowling: Right-arm medium

Domestic team information
- Years: Team
- 1923–1924: Hertfordshire

Career statistics
Competition	First-class
Matches	2
Runs scored	47
Batting average	23.50
100s/50s	0/0
Top score	27
Balls bowled	18
Wickets	0
Bowling average	–
5 wickets in innings	0
10 wickets in match	0
Best bowling	0/22
Catches/stumpings	0/–
- Source: Cricinfo, 12 April 2012

Joseph James Thorley (7 August 1894 – 26 December 1962) was an English cricketer. Thorley was a right-handed batsman who bowled right-arm medium. He was born in Fernham, Berkshire.

Thorley made his debut for Hertfordshire in the 1923 Minor Counties Championship against Bedfordshire. Thorley played Minor counties cricket for Hertfordshire from 1923 to 1924, including 14 Minor Counties Championship matches. In 1925, he made his first-class for Gentlemen in the Gentlemen v Players at Cheriton Road. He played one further first-class match the following year for L. H. Tennyson's XI against F. S. G. Calthorpe's XI at the same venue.

Thorley died in Marylebone, London on 26 December 1962 aged 68.
