= Alexander Eccles =

English cricketer

Alexander Eccles (16 March 1876 – 17 March 1919) was an English cricketer active from 1896 to 1907 who played for Lancashire. He was born and died in Preston. He appeared in 152 first-class matches as a righthanded batsman, scoring 5,129 runs with a highest score of 139 and held 95 catches. He completed six centuries and 22 half-centuries in his career.

Eccles played for Oxford University from 1896 to 1899; and he represented the Gentlemen in 1902. He was the Lancashire club captain for the 1902 season.
