= Alan Imlay =

English cricketer

Personal information
- Full name: Alan Durant Imlay
- Born: February 14, 1885; Cotham, Bristol, England
- Died: July 3, 1959 (aged 74); Brent Knoll, Somerset, England
- Batting: Right-handed
- Role: Wicket-keeper

Domestic team information
- Years: Team
- 1905–1911: Gloucestershire
- 1906–1907: Cambridge University
- FC debut: 25 May 1905 Gloucs v Cambridge Univ.
- Last FC: 19 June 1911 Gloucs v Middlesex

Career statistics
Competition	First-class
Matches	12
Runs scored	166
Batting average	7.90
100s/50s	0/0
Top score	26
Catches/stumpings	16/1
- Source: CricketArchive, 11 June 2025

Alan Durant Imlay (14 February 1885 – 3 July 1959) was an English cricketer. A wicket keeper and right-handed batsman from Cotham, Bristol, Imlay was educated at Clifton College and played cricket there first for the junior team in 1898, and then the senior XI between 1903 and 1904. His prowess led to his inclusion in a national Public Schools XI in 1904, and he proceeded to join Gloucestershire in 1905.

Imlay made his first-class cricket debut for Gloucestershire in a university match on 25 May 1905 against Cambridge University. He made 17 and 12 with the bat, but 45 extras were conceded in the form of byes. Imlay went up to Emmanuel College, Cambridge in 1904 and played cricket for the University First XI until 1907, playing three matches in total, taking four catches and scoring 20 runs. He then returned to Gloucestershire and played sporadically until 1911, making a total of six more appearances for the county though never bettering his debut score of 17. He took four catches for the county in total, and performed one stumping. He did however make one appearance for the Gentlemen, where he took four catches, and also played for Leveson-Gower's invitational team, for whom he made his career-best score of 26 with the bat. He died in Brent Knoll, north of Burnham on Sea in Somerset.
