= Edward McCormick =

English cricketer

Edward James McCormick (1 November 1862 – 31 December 1941) was an English cricketer active from 1880 to 1890 who played for Sussex. He was born in Hastings and died in County Tipperary. He appeared in 50 first-class matches as a righthanded batsman who bowled right arm medium pace. He scored 1,346 runs with a highest score of 73 and took nine wickets with a best performance of two for 36.
