= Francis Monkland =

English cricketer

Francis George Monkland (8 October 1854 – 15 January 1915) was an English first-class cricketer. He was a right-handed batsman and an underarm right arm slow bowler who played mainly for Gloucestershire County Cricket Club from 1874 to 1879. Monkland was born at Trichinopoly, Madras Presidency, India.

Monkland made 31 first-class appearances, scoring 534 runs with a highest innings score of 59, which was his sole half-century. He took 11 catches in his career but no wickets as he was only an occasional bowler.

Monkland died at Regent's Park, London on 15 January 1915.
