= Edward Tritton =

English cricketer

Edward William Tritton (3 August 1844 – 1 December 1901) was an English first-class cricketer active from 1864 to 1875 who played for Middlesex and Oxford University. He was born at Marylebone and died at Paignton. He appeared in 39 first-class matches as a right-handed batsman and occasional wicket-keeper who rarely bowled. He scored 1,000 runs with a highest score of 114, one of two centuries in his career, and held 20 catches. He took one wicket with a best performance of one for 34.

Tritton was educated at Eton, where he played cricket for the school in 1862, and Christ Church, Oxford, where he matriculated in 1863 and graduated B.A. in 1869. He studied law at the Inner Temple and was called to the bar in 1871.
