= Percy Latham =

Welsh cricketer

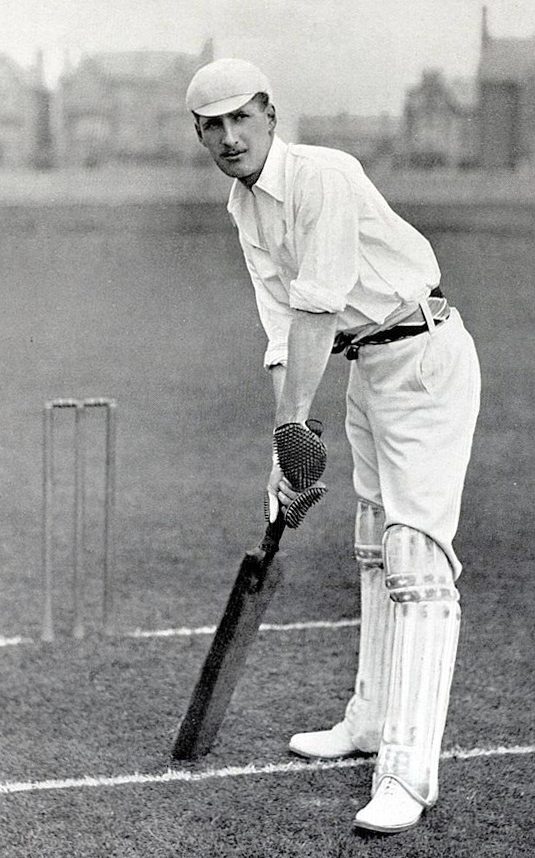

Personal information
- Full name: Percy Holland Latham
- Born: 3 February 1873; Llandudno, Wales
- Died: 22 June 1922 (aged 49); Haileybury College, Hertfordshire, England
- Batting: Right-handed
- Bowling: Right-arm slow

Domestic team information
- Years: Team
- 1892–1894: Cambridge University
- 1895: Worcestershire
- 1898–1906: Sussex

Career statistics
Competition	First-class
Matches	63
Runs scored	2,580
Batting average	26.06
100s/50s	3/25
Top score	172
Balls bowled	142
Wickets	2
Bowling average	49.50
5 wickets in innings	0
10 wickets in match	0
Best bowling	1/0
Catches/stumpings	31/–
- Source: CricInfo, 27 April 2023

Percy Holland Latham (3 February 1873 – 22 June 1922) was a Welsh cricketer active from 1892 to 1906 who played for Sussex. He appeared in 63 first-class matches as a righthanded batsman who bowled right arm slow. He scored 2,580 runs with a highest score of 172 and took two wickets with a best performance of one for 0.

Latham was educated at Malvern College and Pembroke College, Cambridge. He played cricket for Cambridge 1892–94 and was captain in 1894. After graduating he taught at Haileybury College from 1895 until his death.
