= Arthur Sutthery =

English cricketer (1864–1937)

Personal information
- Full name: Arthur Melbourne Sutthery
- Born: 25 March 1864; Clifton Reynes, Buckinghamshire, England
- Died: 15 May 1937 (aged 73); Chelsea, London, England
- Batting: Right-handed
- Bowling: Right-arm medium-fast

Domestic team information
- Years: Team
- 1886–1887: Cambridge University

Career statistics
Competition	First-class
Matches	20
Runs scored	658
Batting average	20.56
100s/50s	–/5
Top score	73
Balls bowled	1,486
Wickets	23
Bowling average	1
5 wickets in innings	–
10 wickets in match	–
Best bowling	5/51
Catches/stumpings	11/–
- Source: Cricinfo, 26 January 2023

Arthur Melbourne Sutthery (25 March 1864 – 15 May 1937) was an English cricketer who played in 20 first-class cricket matches for Cambridge University and other amateur teams between 1886 and 1888. He was born at Clifton Reynes in Buckinghamshire and died at Chelsea, London in May 1937 aged 73.

The son of the vicar of Clifton Reynes, Sutthery was educated at Uppingham School, Oundle School and Jesus College, Cambridge.

As a cricketer, he was a right-handed middle-order batsman and a right-arm medium-pace bowler. He achieved little in his first season of first-class cricket for Cambridge in 1886 and had lost his place in the first eleven before the University Match against Oxford University. In 1887, however, he developed into a reliable batsman, and made scores of 72 in both the Surrey and the Marylebone Cricket Club matches, the games immediately before the University Match of that year. He won his Blue by appearing in the 1887 University Match and his 73 was both his own highest first-class score and the highest score in the first Cambridge innings, though the match was comfortably lost. Sutthery's reward was to be picked for the Gentlemen v Players match at The Oval 10 days later, one of the highlights of a non-Test season. At the end of the 1887 season, Sutthery also played in the North v South fixture, another of the great set-piece matches of the English cricket season.

Sutthery graduated from Cambridge University with a Bachelor of Arts degree in 1887 and his first-class cricket after leaving Cambridge was restricted to the 1888 season. He played twice in that season for an unofficial "England XI" which met the 1888 Australians in matches second only to the Test matches in importance; in the second of these, he had a personal triumph, scoring 54 of his side's second innings total of 98 – no one else reached double figures – and outscoring on his own the Australian first-innings total of just 47. At the end of the 1888 season he again played in the North v South fixture and also appeared for South in the final match of the season against the Australians: it was his last first-class match.

Below first-class he played at county level for Northamptonshire, Devon and, between 1898 and 1900, for Shropshire while playing at club level for Market Drayton. For Shropshire he played in six matches, totaled 254 runs with a best match score of 66 runs, and took six wickets.

Sutthery's later career is unclear. He was a schoolmaster at Exeter from 1889 to 1893, and was employed also as a master at Harrow School during the First World War. He is also recorded as having acted as a private tutor at St Leonards-on-Sea, Sussex and, having married a Scottish woman and moved to Scotland, he was associated with the Glasgow Herald newspaper.
