= Cecil Maxwell =

English cricketer

Personal information
- Full name: Cecil Reginald Napp Maxwell
- Born: 21 May 1913; Paddington, London, England
- Died: 25 September 1973 (aged 60); Taunton, Somerset, England
- Batting: Right-handed
- Role: Wicket-keeper

Domestic team information
- Years: Team
- 1936 to 1939: Nottinghamshire
- 1946: Middlesex
- 1948 to 1951: Worcestershire

Career statistics
Competition	First-class
Matches	44
Runs scored	1564
Batting average	26.06
100s/50s	1/9
Top score	268
Balls bowled	0
Wickets	–
Bowling average	–
5 wickets in innings	–
10 wickets in match	–
Best bowling	–
Catches/stumpings	70/25
- Source: CricketArchive, 18 July 2019

Cecil Reginald Napp Maxwell (21 May 1913 – 25 September 1973) was an English first-class cricketer.

After attending Brighton College, Cecil Maxwell was recruited by Sir Julien Cahn to play in his professional cricket team. Maxwell represented the Gentlemen versus the Players at Lord's in 1935. He played in 44 first-class matches for Nottinghamshire, MCC, Middlesex and Worcestershire as a right-handed batsman and a wicket-keeper between 1932 and 1951. His highest first-class innings (and only hundred) – 268 for Sir Julien Cahn's XI against Leicestershire in 1935, made in 190 minutes – is the highest by any player batting at number eight.
