= William Williams (cricketer, born 1844) =

English cricketer

William Williams (25 November 1844 – 12 March 1885) was an English first-class cricketer, who was active from 1862 to 1878, and played for Nottinghamshire. He was born in Nottingham, and died in Wandsworth. He played in fifteen first-class matches as a right-handed batsman, scoring 239 runs with a highest score of 31; and as a right-arm roundarm fast bowler, taking three wickets with a best performance of two for 27.
