= Monty Garland-Wells =

English cricketer

Personal information
- Full name: Herbert Montandon Garland-Wells
- Born: 14 November 1907; Brockley, London, England
- Died: 6 June 1993 (aged 85); Brighton, Sussex, England
- Batting: Right-handed
- Bowling: Right-arm medium
- Role: All-rounder

Domestic team information
- Years: Team
- 1927–1930: Oxford University
- 1928–1939: Surrey
- FC debut: 28 May 1927 Oxford Univ. v Army
- Last FC: 31 August 1939 Surrey v Lancashire

Career statistics
Competition	First-class
Matches	190
Runs scored	6,068
Batting average	23.33
100s/50s	4/29
Top score	128
Balls bowled	15,254
Wickets	185
Bowling average	41.17
5 wickets in innings	2
10 wickets in match	0
Best bowling	5/25
Catches/stumpings	141/–
- Source: CricketArchive, 27 April 2008

Herbert Montandon "Monty" Garland-Wells (14 November 1907 – 6 June 1993) was an English amateur cricketer. His first-class career, first with Oxford University and then with Surrey, lasted from 1927 until 1939, being terminated by the outbreak of World War II. He was a middle-order batsman and a bowler of medium-pace cutters. He captained Surrey in his final season. He was also a good enough footballer to play for the England amateur team in one match in 1930 as the goalkeeper. He played 11 games in the Football League for Clapton Orient. He also played for Fulham in a London Challenge Cup match in 1930 as a goalkeeper.

He was educated at St Paul's, before going up to Pembroke College, Oxford. He was not selected to play for Oxford in the University Match against Cambridge University in 1927, but did so in 1928 (when he made 64 not out and 70), 1929 and 1930.

1928 was easily his best season with the bat. He reached one thousand runs for the only time, with 1270 at an average of 43.79. He also made two of his four centuries, including his highest score of 128.

After his university days, his batting declined. Even so, he, Errol Holmes and Freddie Brown, three amateurs of aggressive intent who often followed one another in the batting order, were referred to at Surrey as the "Biff-Bang Boys". His most memorable moment with the ball was to bowl Don Bradman for 32 in 1930 when he was en route to his thousand runs in May.

Under his captaincy in 1939, Surrey made an excellent start, but then faded to finish eighth, having been third the previous season. Nevertheless, his Wisden obituary is complimentary about his leadership. He is described as displaying "a touch of unorthodoxy in the tradition of Percy Fender". He was liked by the professional players, showing no sign of any amateur aloofness. According to David Lemmon, he wrote: "For myself, I loved every moment of 1939 and other years when I played for Surrey."

At the end of the season, the war began, and his career as a solicitor prevented him from resuming in 1946. Thereafter his main sports were golf and bowls.

According to Wisden:

During the war his name was informally used as a code word in North Africa: Garland-Wells = Monty = Montgomery. This was more impenetrable to the Germans than the most complicated cipher.
