= Edwin Napper =

English cricketer

Edwin Napper (26 January 1815 – 8 March 1895) was an English amateur cricketer who played from 1839 to 1862.

A left-handed batsman and right arm medium pace roundarm bowler who was mainly associated with Sussex, he made 128 known appearances. He was the second Sussex club captain, succeeding C. G. Taylor before the 1847 season and holding the post until 1862. He represented the Gentlemen in the Gentlemen v Players series and the South in the North v. South series.

Napper subsequently became a "most enthusiastic and generous patron of the game". His brother, William, also played.

== Bibliography ==
- Haygarth, Arthur (1996) [1862]. Scores & Biographies, Volume 1 (1744–1826). Kennington: Frederick Lillywhite. ISBN 978-19-00592-23-9.
- Haygarth, Arthur (1997) [1862]. Scores & Biographies, Volume 2 (1827–1840). Kennington: Frederick Lillywhite. ISBN 978-19-00592-23-9.
