= William Lautour =

English cricketer

Personal information
- Full name: William Francis Joseph Lautour
- Born: 21 August 1812; Marylebone, Middlesex, England
- Died: 11 November 1899 (aged 87); Hexton, Hertfordshire, England
- Nickname: William Francis Joseph Lautour Young
- Batting: Left-handed

Domestic team information
- Years: Team
- 1849: Hampshire
- 1845–1847: Marylebone Cricket Club

Career statistics
Competition	FC
Matches	18
Runs scored	183
Batting average	6.31
100s/50s	–/–
Top score	30*
Balls bowled	56
Wickets	7
Bowling average	29.00
5 wickets in innings	–
10 wickets in match	–
Best bowling	3?
Catches/stumpings	3/–
- Source: ESPNcricinfo, 29 April 2010

William Francis Joseph Lautour (21 August 1812 – 11 November 1899) was an English cricketer. Lautour was a left-handed batsman.

Lautour made his debut for the left-handed cricket team against the Marylebone Cricket Club in 1838. In between making his debut for the Marylebone Cricket Club in 1845, he represented a number of teams in other matches. Lautour represented the West, the Gentlemen in the 1844 Gentlemen v Players match as well as playing for the Rest of England against Kent.

In 1845, he made his debut for the Marylebone Cricket Club against Hampshire. Overall he represented the club in 3 matches up to 1847. During this period he also played a number of non matches for Dorset.

In 1849, Lautour represented Hampshire in a single match against an All England Eleven. In the same year he played his final match for Gentlemen of England against the Gentlemen of Kent.

Lautour died on 11 November 1899 at Hexton, Hertfordshire.
