= Robert Drummond Balfour =

English cricketer (1844–1915)

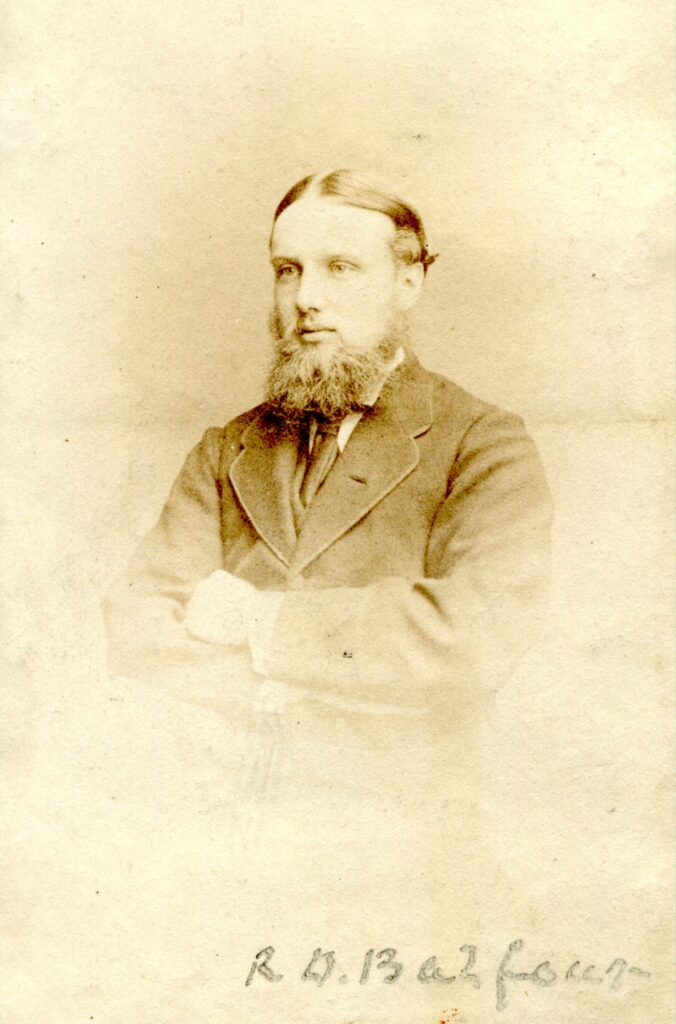
- Robert Drummond Balfour c.1872
- Born: 1 March 1844; Putney, Surrey, England
- Died: 7 May 1915 (aged 71)
- Education: Westminster School, London; Bradfield College, Berkshire
- Occupations: Cricketer; Stockbroker
- Spouse: Catherine Elizabeth Donaldson (m. 1876)
- Relatives: Edward Balfour (brother); Archibald Balfour (brother)

Robert Drummond Balfour (1 March 1844 – 7 May 1915) was an English cricketer who won four consecutive blues playing for Cambridge University between 1863 and 1866. Following University he continued his first-class career with a variety of invitational sides and represented Scotland against Surrey.

== Early career ==
Robert Drummond Balfour was born on 1 March 1844 in Putney, Surrey and was educated at Bradfield College, from 1857 to 1859 at Westminster School, and then at Magdalene College, Cambridge. He was a right-handed, middle or lower-order batsman and wicket-keeper. By the time he went up to Cambridge Balfour had already played a good standard of club cricket for I Zingari and for a XXII of Cirencester against the United All-England Eleven. He made his first-class debut for Cambridge University against MCC in 1863, and remained a first choice in the eleven for five years.

== Later career ==
After completing his studies he continued to play regularly for the MCC and also once for the Gentlemen versus Players. He represented Scotland in their first-ever capped match, against Surrey. His final appearance in first-class Cricket was for the MCC against Cambridge University in 1873. In 59 first-class innings Balfour scored 685 runs at an average of 12.45. His highest score was 82. As a 'keeper he effected 33 dismissals, 22 of which were catches and 11 stumpings. There is no record of him bowling. He is known to have batted alongside W. G. Grace, for example when he was the first batsman in the MCC's match against Hertfordshire at Chorleywood, in May 1872.

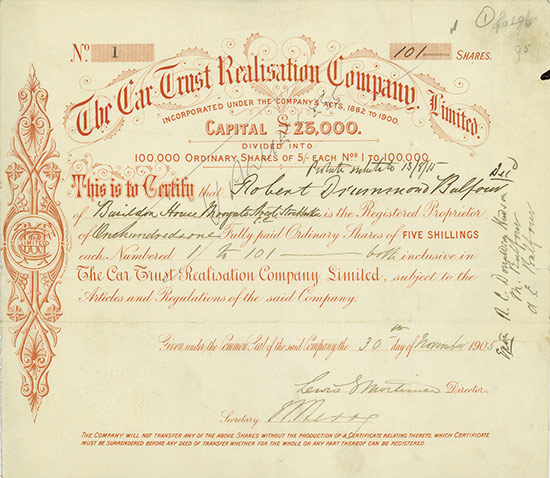
Share certificate showing Drummond as stock broker

Drummond Balfour became a stockbroker and a member of the Stock Exchange with the firm of Capel & Co. He married Catherine Elizabeth Donaldson in 1876 and died on 7 May 1915 at Sherrards, a house located near The Frythe in Welwyn, Hertfordshire.
