= The London Review =

London Review has formed the title or partial title of a number of periodicals, some of which lasted only for a short period. These include:

- (1775–1780) London Review of English and Foreign Literature, founded by William Kenrick
- (1782–1826) European Magazine and London Review
- (1809) The London Review, edited by Richard Cumberland
- (1829) The London Review, founded by Nassau Senior and Richard Whately
- (1835) The London Review, founded by John Stuart Mill and other philosophical radicals, merged into The Westminster Review the following year
- (1860s) The London Review and Weekly Journal of Politics, Literature, Art, & Society
- (1979, current) London Review of Books
