= Charles Wynch =

English cricketer

Personal information
- Full name: Charles George Wynch
- Born: 27 July 1833; Calcutta, Bengal Presidency, British Raj
- Died: 21 May 1876 (aged 42); Westminster, London, England
- Batting: Right-handed
- Bowling: Unknown

Domestic team information
- Years: Team
- 1859–1865: Marylebone Cricket Club
- 1852–1859: Sussex

Career statistics
Competition	First-class
Matches	24
Runs scored	758
Batting average	21.05
100s/50s	–/4
Top score	87
Balls bowled	8
Wickets	2
Bowling average	?
5 wickets in innings	–
10 wickets in match	–
Best bowling	1/?
Catches/stumpings	9/–
- Source: ESPNcricinfo, 29 September 2012

Charles George Wynch (24 July 1833 – 21 May 1876) was an English cricketer. Wynch was a right-handed batsman, though his bowling style is unknown. He was born at Calcutta in the British Raj and was educated at Rugby School and Haileybury and Imperial Service College.

Wynch made his first-class debut for Sussex against Kent in 1852 at the Higher Common Ground, Tunbridge Wells. He made a further first-class appearance for the county in that year in the return fixture between the sides at the Royal Brunswick Ground, Hove. A journeyman first-class cricketer, Wynch turned out for a number of teams besides Sussex. In 1853, he played for the Gentlemen of England against the Gentlemen of Kent, immediately following this game up with an appearance for the Gentlemen of England against the Gentlemen of the Marylebone Cricket Club, with both matches played at Lord's. In that same year, he played for the Gentlemen against the Players, as well as making a single appearance for Sussex against England. In 1854, he made two first-class appearances, one for the Gentlemen of England against the Gentlemen of Kent, as well as playing for the Gentlemen against the Players at Lord's.

His next appearance in first-class cricket didn't come until 1859, when he played for the Marylebone Cricket Club against the Surrey Club at The Oval. He made further first-class appearances in 1859, for the Gentlemen of the South against the Gentlemen of the North, as well as for the Surrey Club against the Marylebone Cricket Club. He also made two appearances for Sussex, both against Kent. The following year he made three appearances in first-class cricket, for the Marylebone Cricket Club against Cambridge University at Fenner's, for the Gentlemen against the Players and for the Gentlemen of the South against the Gentlemen of the North. In 1861, he played two matches for the Marylebone Cricket Club against Cambridge University and Sussex, as well as a single match for the Gentlemen of the South against the Gentlemen of the North. Two years later he played for the Marylebone Cricket Club against Sussex, following this up in 1864 with a single appearance for the club against Oxford University. He made two further first-class appearances in 1865, one for the Marylebone Cricket Club against Oxford University and another for the Gentlemen of England against the Gentlemen of Middlesex. In 24 appearances in first-class cricket, Wynch scored 758 runs at an average of 21.05, with a high score of 87. One of four half centuries he made, this score came against the Gentlemen of the North in 1859.

He died at Westminster, London, on 21 May 1876.
