= Reginald Machin =

English cricketer (1904–1968)

Reginald Stanley Machin (16 April 1904 – 3 November 1968) was an English first-class cricketer who played for Surrey and Cambridge University. He was active from 1926 to 1934. He was born in Weybridge; died in Wellingborough.
