= William Pullen (cricketer) =

English cricketer

Personal information
- Full name: William Wade Fitzherbert Pullen
- Born: June 24, 1866
- Died: 9 August 1937 (aged 71)
- Batting: Right-handed
- Role: Wicket-keeper

Domestic team information
- Years: Team
- Gloucestershire
- FC debut: 5 June 1882 Gloucestershire v Middlesex
- Last FC: 14 July 1892 Gloucestershire v Somerset
- Source: CricketArchive, 12 July 2025

William Wade Fitzherbert Pullen (24 June 1866 – 9 August 1937) was an English cricketer. A wicket keeper for Gloucestershire, Pullen played ninety-four first-class cricket matches between 1882 and 1892. He took sixty-three catches and performed four stumpings. A right-hand bat, he scored 2,765 runs with a single century of 161 made in 1884. He also played for the Gentlemen, Rest of England and South of England teams on occasion.
