= Philip Wright (cricketer) =

English cricketer

Philip Alan Wright (1903–1968) was an English cricketer active from 1921 to 1929 who played for Northamptonshire. He appeared in 93 first-class matches as a righthanded batsman who bowled right arm medium pace. One of three brothers who played cricket, Wright was born in Kettering on 16 May 1903 and died there on 21 December 1968. He scored 1,459 runs with a highest score of 83 and took 343 wickets with a best performance of six for 37. He also played for Cambridge University and represented the Gentlemen in a Gentlemen v Players match in 1924.
