= Herbert Hayman =

English cricketer

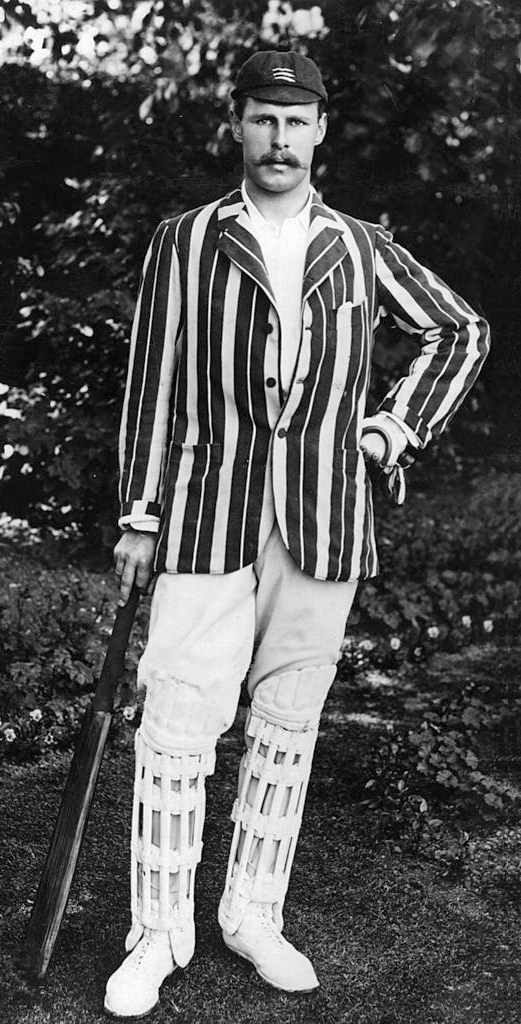

Personal information
- Full name: Herbert Bailey Hayman
- Born: 5 October 1873; Willesden, Middlesex, England
- Died: 31 July 1930 (aged 56); Winslow, Buckinghamshire, England
- Batting: Right-handed

Domestic team information
- Years: Team
- 1893–1901: Middlesex
- 1896–1901: MCC

Career statistics
Competition	First-class
Matches	105
Runs scored	4,663
Batting average	26.49
100s/50s	4/23
Top score	165
Balls bowled	239
Wickets	4
Bowling average	34.50
5 wickets in innings	0
10 wickets in match	0
Best bowling	2/9
Catches/stumpings	23/–
- Source: CricketArchive, 2 August 2012

Herbert Bailey Hayman (10 May 1873 – 31 July 1930) was an English first-class cricketer who played principally for Middlesex and the Marylebone Cricket Club between 1893 and 1901.

== Career ==
Hayman, a right-handed batsman scored 4,663 runs at an average 26.49. His bowling produced four wickets at an average of 34.50.
