= Stanley Brown (cricketer, born 1877) =

English cricketer

Personal information
- Full name: William Stanley Alston Brown
- Born: 23 May 1877; Clifton, Bristol
- Died: 12 September 1952 (aged 75); Kingsdown, Bristol
- Batting: Right-handed
- Bowling: Left-arm slow-medium

Domestic team information
- Years: Team
- 1896–1919: Gloucestershire

Career statistics
Competition	First-class
Matches	164
Runs scored	4,820
Batting average	18.97
100s/50s	2/17
Top score	155
Balls bowled	14,822
Wickets	195
Bowling average	33.38
5 wickets in innings	3
10 wickets in match	0
Best bowling	6/56
Catches/stumpings	139/-
- Source: ESPNcricinfo, 15 June 2014

William Stanley Alston Brown, known as Stanley Brown (23 May 1877 – 12 September 1952) was an English cricketer who played for Gloucestershire as a right-handed batsman and left-arm slow bowler between 1896 and 1919. He made over 160 appearances in first-class cricket, scoring 4,820 runs and taking 195 wickets. He was born in Clifton and died in Kingsdown, both areas of Bristol.
