= Edward Balfour (cricketer) =

English cricketer

Personal information
- Full name: Edward Balfour
- Born: 2 January 1833; Marylebone, Middlesex, England
- Died: 11 August 1856 (aged 23); Genoa, Kingdom of Sardinia
- Batting: Right-handed
- Bowling: Unknown-arm roundarm slow
- Relatives: Robert Balfour (brother); Archibald Balfour (brother)

Domestic team information
- Years: Team
- 1852–1854: Oxford University
- 1853–1854: Marylebone Cricket Club

Career statistics
| Competition | First-class |
|---|---|
| Matches | 28 |
| Runs scored | 586 |
| Batting average | 12.73 |
| 100s/50s | –/2 |
| Top score | 62 |
| Balls bowled | ? |
| Wickets | 44 |
| Bowling average | 10.00 |
| 5 wickets in innings | 3 |
| 10 wickets in match | 1 |
| Best bowling | 5/? |
| Catches/stumpings | 14/2 |
- Source: Cricinfo, 21 August 2019

Edward Balfour (2 January 1833 – 11 August 1856) was an English first-class cricketer.

The son of Charles Balfour, he was born at Marylebone in January 1833. He was educated at Westminster School, before going up to Christ Church, Oxford. While studying at Oxford, he made his debut in first-class cricket for Oxford University against the Marylebone Cricket Club (MCC) at Oxford in 1852. Balfour played first-class cricket for Oxford until 1854, making nine appearances. Playing as an all-rounder, he scored 152 runs for Oxford at an average of 11.69 and a high score of 62. With his roundarm slow bowling, he took 35 wickets for Oxford, taking five wickets in an innings on three occasions and taking ten wickets in a match once. In addition to playing for Oxford, Balfour also played first-class cricket for the MCC on seven occasions in 1853–54, scoring 129 runs with a high score of 36. His best batting return came for the Gentlemen of England, for whom he made five first-class appearances from 1852–54, scoring 185 runs at an average of 23.12. Balfour's other first-class appearances included three each for England and the Gentlemen in the Gentlemen v Players, in addition to one match for the Gentlemen of Marylebone Cricket Club.

His father, a merchant, had business at Genoa in the Kingdom of Sardinia with his company Grants, Balfour & Co. Balfour joined his father in Genoa in 1856, where he died in August "after a few days' illness". His brothers, Robert and Archibald, both played first-class cricket.
