= Thomas Jacques =

English cricketer

Thomas Alec Jacques, better known as Sandy Jacques (19 February 1905 – 23 February 1995) was an English first-class cricketer, who played twenty eight games for Yorkshire County Cricket Club from 1927 to 1936. He also appeared in first-class cricket for the Rest of England and The Gentleman in 1927.

Jacques was born in Cliffe, Selby, Yorkshire, England. Sir Len Hutton said that Jacques had the finest fast bowling action he had ever seen, but what might have been a famous career was curtailed by injury. Jacques made his debut for Yorkshire in 1927, as an amateur and, after only six matches, was picked for a test trial at Lord's in which he took 4 for 53. He generated high pace and was able to maintain his accuracy and penetration over long spells. He turned professional in 1928, but found his body could not stand the strain of constant cricket. He suffered from continuing leg problems, at one point wearing five pairs of socks to cushion his feet, and appeared only intermittently. He turned to league cricket, in which he excelled, and farmed at Cliffe, where he lived all his life. He played thirty first-class matches in all, and never finished on the losing side.

He took 62 wickets in all at 31.20, with a best return of 5 for 33 against Essex. He also took 5 for 67 against Glamorgan. He scored 168 runs, with a top score of 35 not out against Glamorgan, at an average of 12.92. He also took 14 catches.

Jacques died in February 1995 in Selby, at the age of 90.
