= Reginald Rice =

English cricketer

Personal information
- Born: 14 November 1868; Tewkesbury, Gloucestershire
- Died: 11 February 1938 (aged 69); Bedford
- Batting: Right-handed

Domestic team information
- Years: Team
- 1890–1903: Gloucestershire
- 1892–1894: Oxford University
- Source: Cricinfo, 30 March 2014

Reginald William Rice (14 November 1868 – 11 February 1938) was an English cricketer. He was educated at Jesus College, Oxford, and played cricket for Gloucestershire between 1890 and 1903.
