= Robert Sheppard (cricketer) =

English cricketer

Robert Alexander Sheppard (24 August 1879 – 28 January 1953) was an English first-class cricketer active 1904–06 who played for Surrey. He was born in Beddington and died in Carshalton.
