= Montagu Cotterill =

English surgeon and cricket player (1851-1933)

Sir Joseph Montagu Cotterill CMG, FRCSEd, R.A.M.C
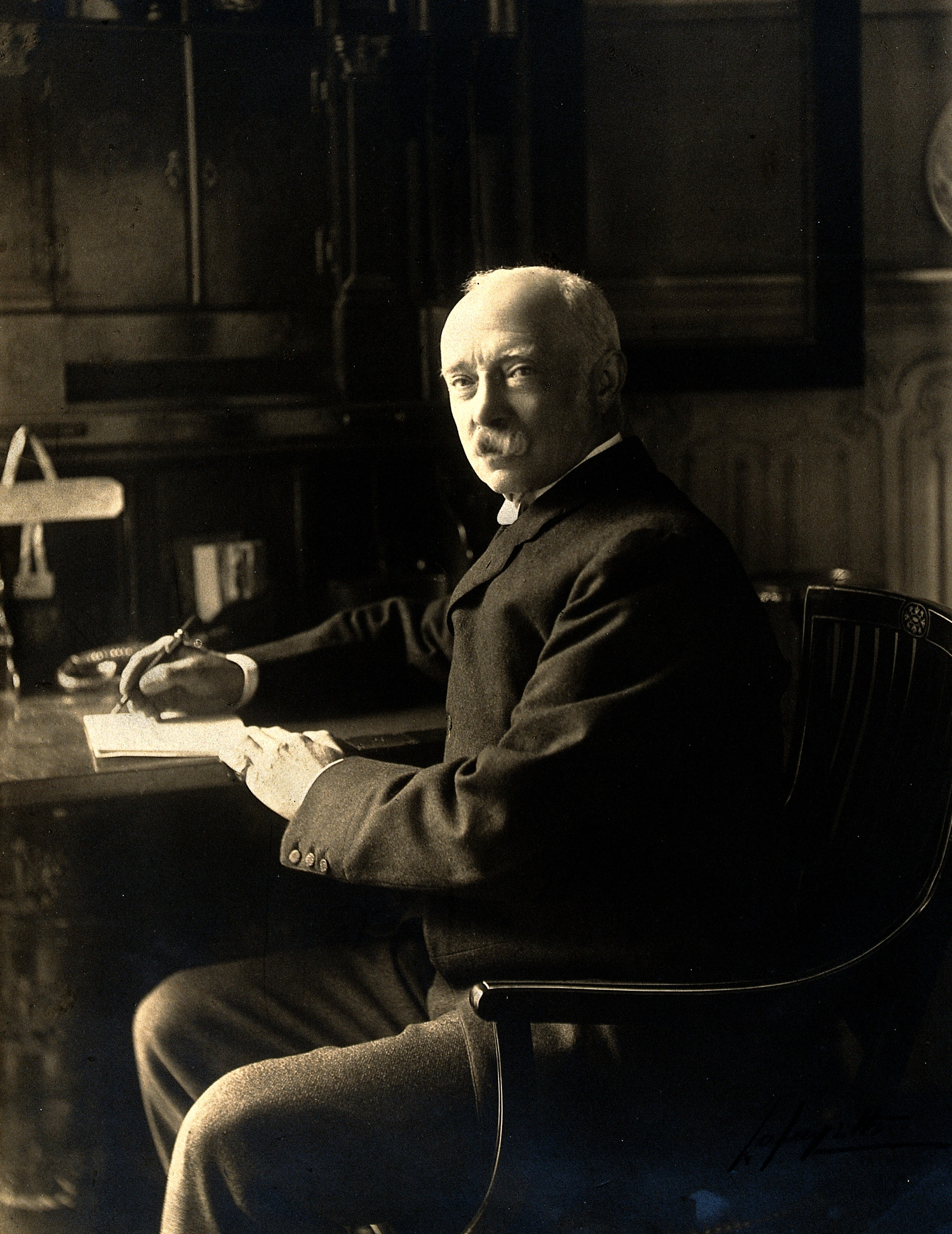
- Born: 23 November 1851; Kemp Town, Sussex, England
- Died: 30 December 1933 (aged 82); Edinburgh, Midlothian, Scotland

Sir Joseph Montagu Cotterill, CMG, FRCSEd, RAMC (23 November 1851 – 30 December 1933) was a surgeon who as a young man played first-class cricket and made one appearance for England. He became a surgeon in Edinburgh and was President of the Royal College of Surgeons of Edinburgh.

== Early life and education ==
The son of the Anglican bishop of Grahamstown and later the Scottish Episcopalian bishop of Edinburgh, Henry Cotterill and Anna Isabella Parnther, he was born at Kemp Town, Sussex. Joseph attended St. Andrew's College, Grahamstown, South Africa, and later Brighton College in Sussex. When his father was appointed Episcopalian Bishop of Edinburgh in 1871, Cotterill entered the University of Edinburgh Medical School, winning prizes in surgery and pathology. A good all round sportsman, he captained the Edinburgh University rugby team, was skilled at golf and billiards and was an excellent shot.

He was house surgeon under Professor Sir Thomas Annandale, in the old Royal Infirmary in Infirmary Street, during its last years at that location. In the years to 1888 he was able to combine surgical training in Edinburgh with first-class cricket appearances in England.

== Cricket ==
A right-handed batsman who bowled right-arm medium pace, Cotterill made his first-class debut for Sussex against Surrey at the Royal Brunswick Ground in 1870.

He made a further first-class appearance in that season against Kent and followed that up three years later by making four further appearances for the county and made the same number of appearances in 1874. In 1875, Cotterill made a single first-class appearances each for the South in the North v South fixture, the Gentlemen of the South against the Players of the North, and for the Gentlemen in the Gentlemen v Players fixture. He made three first-class appearances for Sussex in 1875 and five in 1876. He captained Sussex in 1874 and 1875. The following year he made three first-class appearances for the South against the North and for the Gentlemen against the Players, while appearing twice for Sussex. He also made a single first-class appearance for England against Gloucestershire at The Oval. It would be eleven years before his next appearance in first-class cricket, when he made five appearances for Sussex in 1888, the last of which came against Lancashire at the County Ground, Hove. 27 of Cotterill's first-class matches came for Sussex, with him scoring 1,328 runs at an average of 28.86, with eight half centuries and a single century.

His only century was a score of 191 against Kent in 1875.

| Competition | First-class cricket |
| Matches | 37 |
| Runs scored | 1,708 |
| Batting average | 27.11 |
| 100s/50s | 1/11 |
| Top score | 191 |
| Balls bowled | 377 |
| Wickets | 6 |
| Bowling average | 35.66 |
| 5 wickets in innings | - |
| 10 wickets in match | - |
| Best bowling | 2/44 |
| Catches/stumpings | 16/- |

== Surgical career and later life ==
He became surgical tutor under Sir Thomas Annandale, obtained the FRCSEd in 1878 and was appointed assistant surgeon to the Royal Infirmary of Edinburgh in 1883, full surgeon in 1897 and consulting surgeon in 1912. He was an early exponent of neurosurgery, working alongside the neurologist Sir Byron Bramwell. On the outbreak of World War I he was appointed senior surgeon to the Second Scottish Territorial Hospital at Craigleith, later the Western General Hospital and on demobilisation in 1919 he had been promoted Lieut-Colonel.

In later life he lived at 24 Manor Place in Edinburgh's West End. The house stands next to St Mary's Episcopal Cathedral, where his father was Bishop and during his time there the north gable of the house was redesigned to face the church rather than the street.

Cotterill was elected President of the Royal College of Surgeons of Edinburgh in 1907 and during his term of office major upgrading of the main Playfair Hall and expansion of the College Museum took place. In 1907 he was also elected a member of the Aesculapian Club. He was knighted in 1919.

In later years he became an enthusiastic motorcyclist and at the age of 70 was involved in a motor cycle accident sustaining a depressed skull fracture which required elevation. He made a complete recovery. Cotterill died peacefully at his home in Edinburgh, on 30 December 1933 in his 83rd year. He is buried with his wife Molly in the northern Victorian extension of Dean Cemetery in western Edinburgh, in the north-west section.

== Family ==
In 1879 he married Mary Wynne Jones, daughter of Rev John Wynne Jones, Archdeacon of Bangor. They had 3 daughters and two sons. Their son Denis, who had served as a medical officer throughout WWI, died of influenza 3 weeks after the Armistice in 1918.

Sir Montagu's brother George Edward Cotterill and nephew George Huth Cotterill both played first-class cricket.

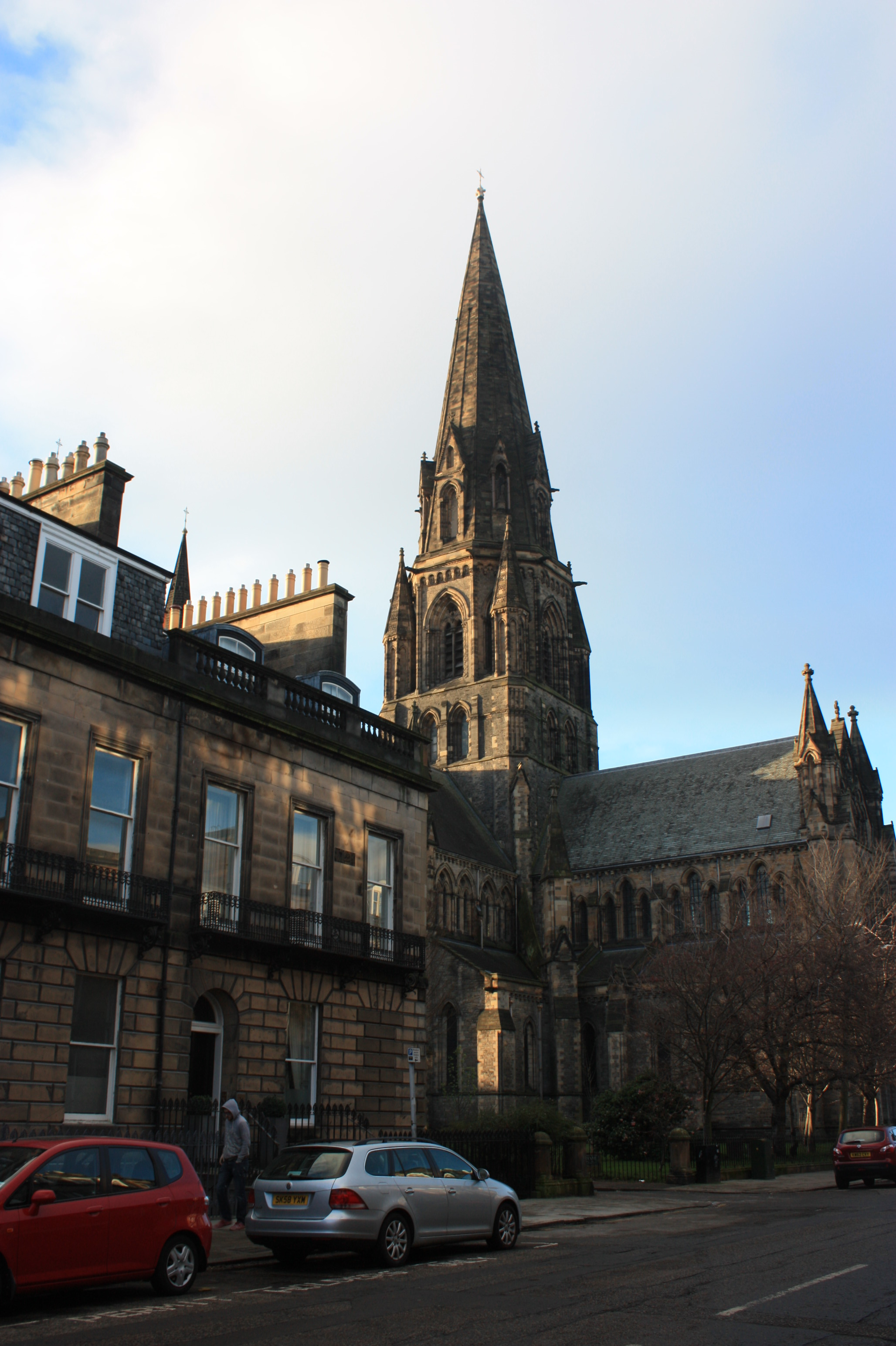
24 Manor Place next to St Mary's Episcopal Cathedral in Edinburgh

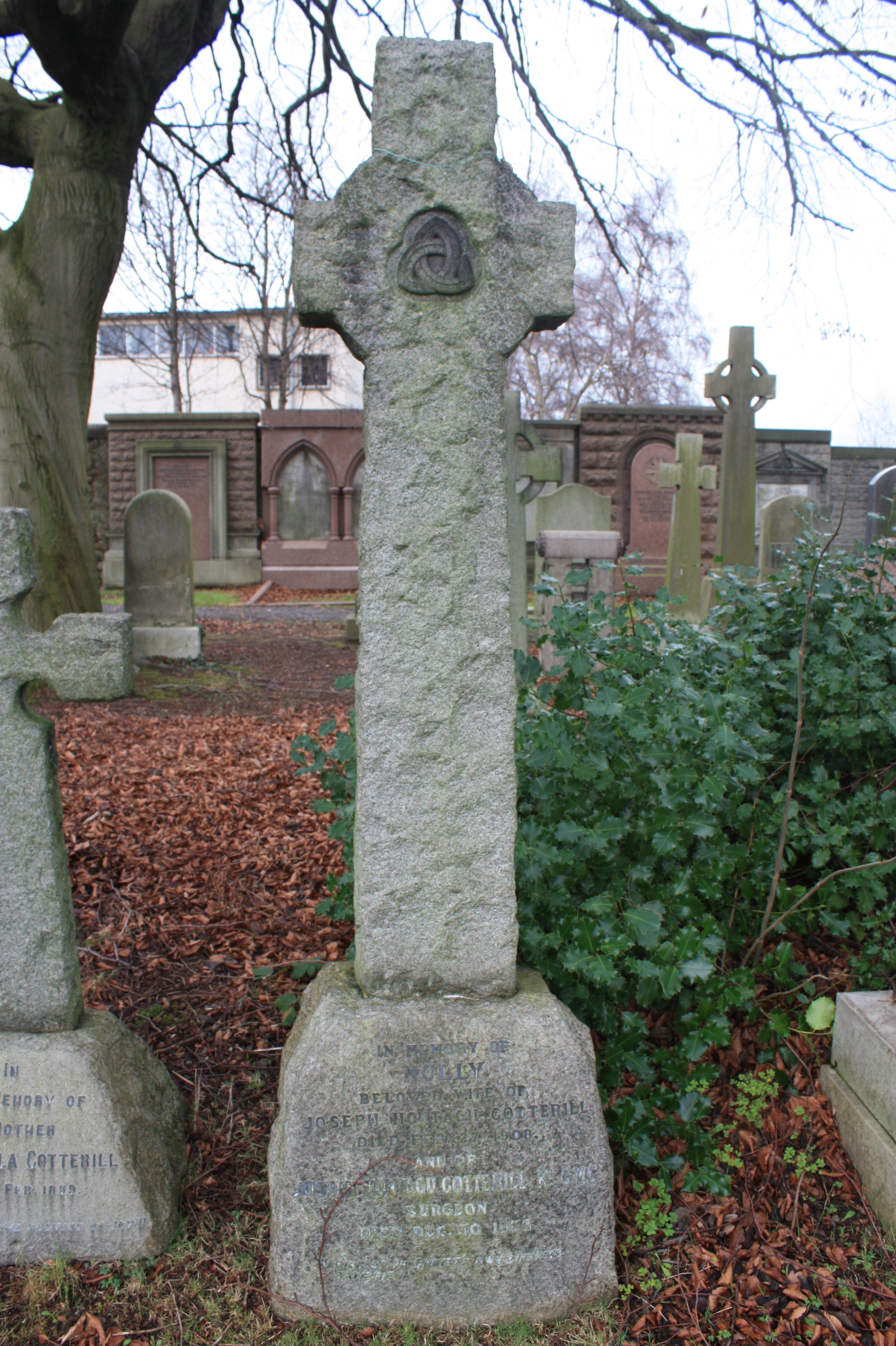
The grave of Joseph Cotterill, Dean Cemetery, Edinburgh

== Notes ==
| Preceded by Sir George Andreas Berry | President of the Royal College of Surgeons of Edinburgh; 1907–1910 | Succeeded by Charles MacGillivray |
| Preceded by Charles Smith | Sussex cricket captain 1874–1875 | Succeeded by Frederick Greenfield |
