= Henry Nicholson (cricketer) =

English cricketer

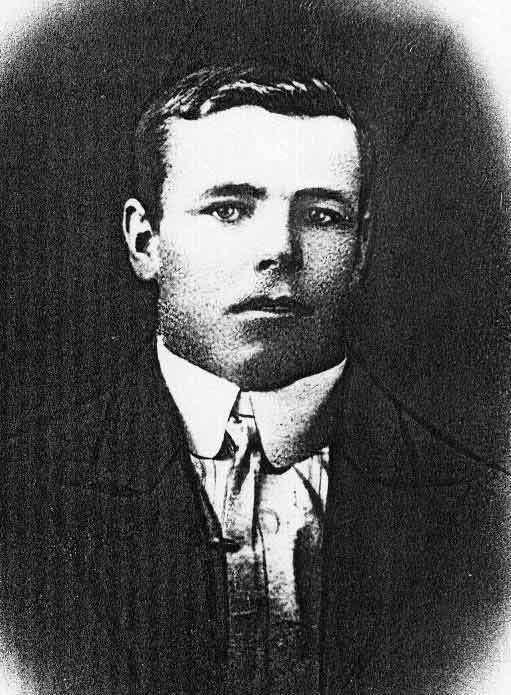

Personal information
- Full name: Henry Wheeler Lloyd Nicholson
- Born: 1832; England
- Died: 20 January 1858 (aged 25–26); Malta
- Batting: Unknown
- Bowling: Unknown

Domestic team information
- Years: Team
- 1853–1855: Sussex

Henry Wheeler Lloyd Nicholson (1832 – 20 January 1858) was an English cricketer. Nicholson's batting and bowling styles are unknown.

Nicholson made his debut for Sussex against Nottinghamshire in 1853. He made ten further appearances for Sussex, the last of which came against Kent in 1855. In his eleven appearances for the county, he scored 272 runs at an average of 14.31, with a high score of 41. Nicholson also played for a handful of other teams. He played three matches for the Gentlemen of England, two matches for the Surrey Club (who he took his five wickets for), and a match each for the South of England and a United England Eleven.

Nicholson died on the Mediterranean island of Malta on 20 January 1858.
