= Edmund Reeves =

English cricketer

Edmund Reeves (November 1821 – 10 December 1906) was an English first-class cricketer active 1848–52 who played for Surrey and Middlesex. He was born in Lambeth and died in Wimbledon. He played in 21 first-class matches.
