= Hugh Bartlett =

English cricketer

Personal information
- Full name: Hugh Tryon Bartlett
- Born: 7 October 1914; Balaghat, India
- Died: 28 June 1988 (aged 73); Hove, Sussex, England
- Batting: Left-handed
- Role: Batsman

Domestic team information
- Years: Team
- 1933–1935: Surrey
- 1934–1936: Cambridge University
- 1936–1946: Marylebone Cricket Club
- 1937–1949: Sussex

Career statistics
Competition	First-class
Matches	216
Runs scored	10,098
Batting average	31.95
100s/50s	16/59
Top score	183
Balls bowled	346
Wickets	10
Bowling average	26.390
5 wickets in innings	0
10 wickets in match	0
Best bowling	1/0
Catches/stumpings	70/–
- Source: Cricket Archive, 27 February 2014

Hugh Tryon Bartlett DFC (7 October 1914 – 26 June 1988) was an English cricketer who played as an attacking left-handed batsman for Sussex either side of World War II.

== Early years ==
Bartlett was born in Balaghat, India, and moved to England at the age of nine. He captained Dulwich College for three seasons. In 1933 – his last season for the school – he hit two double hundreds in successive weeks and set a Dulwich record of 228 against Mill Hill (the record stood until 2006, when Arthur Mitchell hit 230 not out at a lower age group). He won blues at Cambridge University for three years and in 1936 captained them in the Varsity match. After a few matches with Surrey, he settled down as an amateur at Sussex.

== 1938 ==
Bartlett's finest year was 1938. While travelling by train to Leeds to play Yorkshire in May, his captain Jack Holmes told him : "If you score 50 I will give you your cap ... a 50 against Yorkshire is worth 150 against any other county." Sussex lost their first five wickets for 106 when Bartlett joined Harry Parks. They added 126 in 75 minutes of which Bartlett scored 94. The bowlers were Bill Bowes, Hedley Verity, Frank Smailes, Emmott Robinson and Cyril Turner. He hit seven sixes (all off Verity) and nine fours. In two overs by Verity, Bartlett scored 062660 and 006606. The last six was his final scoring shot as he tried to hit Smailes over long off and was caught by Maurice Leyland "with his heels on the boundary and left hand outstretched". Bartlett was duly awarded his county cap.

Later at Lord's, Bartlett made 175 not out in his first appearance for Gentlemen against the Players. One six off Morris Nichols deposited the ball in a grandstand turret. He hit Nichols for five fours in an over, Peter Smith for two fours and two sixes off another. In all, he hit 24 fours and four sixes in 165 minutes. His last 75 runs came in 46 minutes; with last man Ken Farnes (10), he added 82 in 45 minutes. "I do not recall", wrote the Cricketer correspondent, "even Jessop treating professional bowling quite so roughly as he did in this innings".

On 27 August, the Australians came to Hove and Bartlett hit 157 in two hours. He scored his 50 in 33 minutes, 100 in 57 minutes and 150 in 110 minutes. A pull off Frank Ward early on landed on the pavilion roof. Later he hit two fours and two sixes off successive balls from Ward in an over that went for 22 runs. The century won Bartlett the Lawrence trophy for the fastest hundred of the season and included six sixes and eleven fours. He scored 104 runs before lunch in just over an hour before slowing down. The fourth wicket partnership with James Langridge contributed 195 in 120 minutes – Bartlett 152, Langridge 39. The innings included six sixes and eighteen fours. Once again he fell to an extraordinary catch, this time by Sid Barnes low down at long on.

With 1548 runs at 57.33, Bartlett finished fifth in the averages (behind Wally Hammond, Joe Hardstaff, Jr., Len Hutton and Eddie Paynter). Wisden elected him as a Cricketer of the Year in the 1939 edition. He hit 40 sixes in 1938, second only to Arthur Wellard. Immediately after his innings against Australia, when Arthur Fagg dropped out, Bartlett was added to the English team to tour South Africa that winter. He toured and scored 358 runs at an average of 51.14 in the first-class matches but did not play in any of the Tests. A year later, he was selected for the planned Indian tour under the captaincy of Jack Holmes, but the Second World War led to its cancellation.

== Batting style ==
In the nostalgic piece about Bartlett that he wrote for Cricket Heroes, Alan Ross remembered his batting style :

As a cricketer, domesticity was just not in his line. He began his innings usually as one who, suffering from violent astigmatism, has not only mislaid his glasses, but had in addition a fearful headache. He made a pass or two after the ball had gone past him: he lunged fitfully and missed: he stabbed down just in time at the straight ones: he sliced the rising offside ball over the second slip: he snicked hazily past his leg stump. So, for about a quarter of an hour, it went on: or, to such an agonized onlooker as I, it seemed to go on. Then suddenly, he would catch a half volley or a long hop such a crack that the bowler, fearful of his own safety, lost all his aggressive intention, and, with it, any idea of length.

Phase two then began. One no longer felt that the bowler was remotely interested in the stumps, but having scattered his fielders around the boundary, relied now, in the form of bait, on a species of poisoned chocolate. Bartlett paid scant heed to these exiled boundary creatures: at alarming rates he drove between, over, and if needs be, through them. He was a firm footed hitter, possessed of a long reach, and the trajectory of his drives was low and of a fearful power.

In the 57-minute hundred against the Australians, Bartlett scored just four in his first 14 minutes.

== 1939 and the war ==
In 1939, at Eastbourne against Worcestershire he scored 89 in 44 minutes. He was caught by Charles Palmer at deep extra cover off a hit that, like the one against Yorkshire in 1938, would have gone for six had he missed it. At the end of the season, he played in what was to be Hedley Verity's last match before he died in the Second World War. On a drying wicket Verity took 7 for 9, Bartlett being one of the victims.

In the Second World War, Bartlett was commissioned into the Royal Army Service Corps. He transferred to the Royal West Kent Regiment in 1942, served in the Glider Pilot Regiment and later served as the second-in-command to Billy Griffith. Bartlett commanded the 'A' squadron and took part in three major operations - the airborne assault at Normandy on the D-Day, the Battle of Arnhem, and the Rhine crossings. In August 1945, he was awarded the Distinguished Flying Cross for serving as a glider pilot in Arnhem. Legend has it that Bartlett's hair turned grey in a single night when he flew his commanding officer to Arnhem.

During the Rhine campaign (Operation Varsity), his pilots included Welsh rugby union centre Bleddyn Williams, who had piloted in a cargo of medical and radio supplies. Having spent a week sleeping rough, he bumped into Bartlett on a Friday morning: "Williams, aren't you meant to be at Welford Road tomorrow playing for Great Britain against the Dominions? They need you. Go now!" Williams caught the last supply plane to RAF Brize Norton that night, and although the team didn't win he did score a try. He turned out for both the RAF and the Great Britain United rugby teams.

He reached the rank of Major. He remained in the Territorial Army after the war, returning to the RASC.

== Post-war ==
After the war, except the odd occasion, he wasn't the stroke player that he had been. He served as Billy Griffith's vice captain at Sussex in 1946 and took over the captaincy for the next three seasons. In 1947, he lifted Sussex from bottom to ninth place, but they slipped back to 16th and 14th in the next two years. He scored more than a thousand runs in 1938, 1939 and 1947. Before the 1950 season, he resigned the captaincy following some disputes and returned to stockbroking. Later, he reconciled with the club and served as the President between 1977 and 1979.

He collapsed and died while watching Sussex play Yorkshire in a Sunday League match at Hove in 1988.

Sporting positions
Preceded by Billy Griffith	Sussex county cricket captain 1947–1949	Succeeded by James Langridge
