= John Lee (cricketer) =

English clergyman & cricketer (1825–1903)

John Morley Lee (12 October 1825 – 20 January 1903) was an English clergyman and cricketer who played in first-class cricket matches for Cambridge University, Surrey, Marylebone Cricket Club (MCC) and various other amateur teams in the late 1840s. He was born at Chelsea, London and died at Botley, Hampshire.

== Family and background ==
Lee was privately educated at Oundle and then at St John's College, Cambridge. He was the son of a London-based builder, Henry Lee, described as coming from Chiswell Street in Finsbury but later settling in Balham; John Lee's younger half-brother, Frederick, 15 years younger, was also a first-class cricketer, playing for Cambridge University, Surrey and other amateur sides.

== Cricket career ==
As a cricketer, Lee appeared in a couple of matches for Cambridge University in the 1845 season as a tail-end right-handed batsman, but made little impression; he did not take any wickets with his right-arm medium-fast bowling, and scorecards being incomplete for these games it is not clear whether he bowled or not. In his first match of 1846, his round-arm bowling proved decisive with nine wickets in a narrow victory for the university over the MCC. He took 10 wickets in the return match in London, though this was a 12-a-side first-class game. He was then picked for the 1846 University match against Oxford University which was played in Oxford. Later in the 1846 season, Lee played a couple of first-class matches for the Gentlemen of England side.

Lee's success as a bowler continued in 1847 and in the university side's MCC match at Lord's he took seven wickets in the first innings and five in the second, his best figures in first-class cricket (as in most of Lee's matches, the full bowling figures have not been recorded). He played in the University Match for a second time and later in the season played for Surrey, the Gentlemen in the annual Gentlemen v players match at Lord's, and MCC. In his single game for Surrey, he played successfully as a batsman, scoring 40 and 20 in a game with Kent, and appears not to have bowled. There was a similar pattern to Lee's cricket in 1848, his last season at Cambridge and his third appearance in the University match; He appeared for Surrey and for "Gentlemen of England" after the university cricket season ended. But his bowling was less effective in 1848 and he often batted high in the batting order, scoring an innings of 110, by a long way his highest score, in the Cambridge game against the Gentlemen of Kent, when he opened the innings.

Lee played very little cricket in 1849 but returned, without distinction, in 1850 in eight first-class games, including an appearance for England, and another in the Gentlemen v Players series. He also played in a remarkable South v North match which was scheduled for three days but completed in one day with John Wisden taking all 10 South wickets, including Lee's, in the second innings. He did not play first-class cricket after 1850.

== Career after cricket ==
After graduation from Cambridge University in 1848, Lee was ordained first as a deacon and then as a Church of England priest. He was curate at Long Melford, Suffolk and then at Abbot's Langley, Hertfordshire. In 1855, his father bought for him the benefice of Botley, Hampshire, and he remained as rector there for 48 years to his death in 1903, also acting as rural dean of Bishop's Waltham and from 1877 as an honorary canon of Winchester.

Lee died at Botley Rectory on 20 January 1903, aged 77, and was buried at Botley church.

== Family ==
In 1855, Lee married Emily Mary Gingell of Wood House, East Ham; they had two daughters.
