= Esmond Lewis =

English cricketer

Personal information
- Full name: Esmond Burman Lewis
- Born: 5 January 1918; Shirley, Warwickshire, England
- Died: 19 October 1983 (aged 65); Dorridge, West Midlands, England
- Batting: Right-handed
- Role: Wicket-keeper

Domestic team information
- Years: Team
- 1949 – 1958: Warwickshire

Career statistics
Competition	First-class
Matches	47
Runs scored	553
Batting average	12.56
100s/50s	0/1
Top score	51
Catches/stumpings	93/26
- Source: ESPNcricinfo, 20 June 2014

Esmond Burman Lewis (5 January 1918 – 19 October 1983) was an English wicket-keeper who played first-class cricket for Warwickshire from 1949 to 1958.

Lewis began playing for the Warwickshire Second XI in 1936 but had to wait 13 years for his first-class debut. When he finally played, against Oxford University in 1949, he took eight catches and a stumping, setting a Warwickshire record. However, he had to remain the county's reserve wicket-keeper, because the regular wicket-keeper, Dick Spooner, was a better batsman.

Lewis played as an amateur, and was selected three times between 1954 and 1957 to keep wicket for the Gentlemen against the Players. Rather than play county cricket full-time, he chose to support his family by concentrating on his successful business career.
