= Charles Sharp =

English cricketer

Personal information
- Full name: Charles Sharp
- Born: 6 September 1848; Horsham, Sussex, England
- Died: 23 September 1903 (aged 55); England
- Batting: Left-handed
- Bowling: Slow left-arm orthodox

Domestic team information
- Years: Team
- 1873–1884: Sussex

Career statistics
Competition	First-class
Matches	17
Runs scored	345
Batting average	11.12
100s/50s	–/1
Top score	54
Balls bowled	743
Wickets	14
Bowling average	15.28
5 wickets in innings	1
10 wickets in match	–
Best bowling	6/34
Catches/stumpings	10/–
- Source: Cricinfo, 30 June 2012

Charles Sharp (6 February 1848 – 23 September 1903) was an English cricketer. Sharp was a left-handed batsman who bowled slow left-arm orthodox. He was born at Horsham, Sussex.

Davey made his first-class debut for Sussex against Surrey at The Oval in 1873. He made sixteen further first-class appearances for the county, the last of which came against Yorkshire at the Fartown Ground, Huddersfield, in 1884. In his seventeen first-class matches for the county, he scored 345 runs at an average of 11.12, with a high score of 54. This score was his only half century and came against Gloucestershire in 1873. With the ball, he took 14 wickets at a bowling average of 15.28, with best figures of 6/34. These figures were his only five-wicket haul and came against Kent in 1879.

Sharp was club captain of Sussex in the 1879 season. He died on 23 September 1903.
