= Billy Griffith =

English cricketer

Personal information
- Full name: Stewart Cathie Griffith
- Born: 16 June 1914; Wandsworth, London, England
- Died: 7 April 1993 (aged 78); Felpham, West Sussex, England
- Nickname: Billy
- Batting: Right-handed
- Role: Wicket-keeper
- Relatives: Mike Griffith (son); Billy Mead (great-grandson)

International information
- National side: England
- Test debut (cap 332): 11 February 1948 v West Indies
- Last Test: 9 March 1949 v South Africa

Domestic team information
- Years: Team
- 1934–1936: Cambridge University
- 1934: Surrey
- 1937–1954: Sussex

Career statistics
Competition	Test	First-class
Matches	3	215
Runs scored	157	4,846
Batting average	31.40	16.42
100s/50s	1/0	3/15
Top score	140	140
Catches/stumpings	5/0	328/80
- Source: ESPNcricinfo, 4 October 2009

Stewart Cathie Griffith, CBE, DFC, TD (16 June 1914 – 7 April 1993), known as Billy Griffith, was an English cricketer and cricket administrator. He played in three Test matches for England in 1948 and 1949.

He played first-class cricket for Cambridge University (1934–1936), Surrey (1934), Marylebone Cricket Club (MCC) (1935–1953), Sussex (1937–1954) and England (1948–1949).

== Life and career ==
Griffith was born in Wandsworth, London, and educated at Dulwich College and Pembroke College, Cambridge. He scored over 1,200 runs during four years in the 1st XI at Dulwich, despite being in the shadow of Hugh Bartlett, and he became a capable wicket-keeper. He won his blue in his second year at Cambridge. He toured Australia and New Zealand with the MCC under Errol Holmes's captaincy in 1935–36. He lost his Cambridge place to Paul Gibb in 1937.

After graduating from Cambridge, he returned to Dulwich as cricket master and he became the first choice wicket-keeper for Sussex in 1939.

He was commissioned into the Officers' Training Corps in 1938, and transferred to the Royal Army Service Corps in 1939. He later served in the Glider Pilot Regiment with Hugh Bartlett. As second-in-command he carried the commander of the 6th Airborne Division, Major-General Richard "Windy" Gale (coincidentally, he was also from Wandsworth), into Normandy during Operation Overlord, crash landing after being caught in a storm. He took part in the Battle of Arnhem and won the Distinguished Flying Cross. He remained in the Territorial Army (TA) after the war, reaching the rank of lieutenant colonel.

He was appointed captain-secretary of Sussex in 1946. Although he relinquished the captaincy after one year, his wicket-keeping form earned him selection for the MCC tour of the West Indies in 1947–48. On his Test debut he was used as a makeshift opener as three senior batsmen were ill, and made 140 in six hours. It made him the only England player to make his maiden first-class century on his Test debut. He toured South Africa (under F.G. Mann) in 1948–49 and played in the final two Tests, the only wicket-keeper to be preferred to Godfrey Evans between 1946 and 1959 when he was available to play. On his return, he retired from playing cricket full time to take up an appointment as the cricket correspondent of The Sunday Times. After two years in this role, he was appointed by the MCC in 1952 as one of two assistant secretaries to Ronnie Aird at Lord's.

He succeeded Aird as the Secretary of the MCC in 1962, and he oversaw the abolition of amateur status, the introduction of one-day cricket, the creation of the Test and County Cricket Board, the Cricket Council, and the "D'Oliveira Affair". His busy schedule in 1962–63 prevented him from managing the MCC tour of Australia in 1962–63, except for one month when he flew out to relieve the Duke of Norfolk. Aware of M.J.K. Smith's natural caution on the MCC tour of Australia in 1965–66, Griffith was given extraordinary powers granting him overall control of cricket while managing the tour. He did not resort to these powers as he preferred more diplomatic means, but he urged attacking cricket in the tour games, notably against Western Australia. Smith asked him when he should declare, Griffith said "Now!" and the MCC won by nine runs in the last minute. The deadpan Smith observed "that's the last time I take the ruddy manager's advice on a declaration".

He retired in 1974, and he later served as Chairman of the Friends of Arundel Castle Cricket Club. His son, Mike Griffith, also captained Sussex.

Billy Griffith died in Felpham, West Sussex, following a long illness in 1993, aged 78.

Sporting positions
Preceded by Jack Holmes	Sussex county cricket captain 1946	Succeeded by Hugh Bartlett
