= Charles Coltson =

English cricketer

Personal information
- Full name: Charles Coltson
- Born: Unknown; Lambeth, Surrey, England
- Died: 15 March 1852; Kennington, Surrey, England
- Batting: Unknown

Domestic team information
- Years: Team
- 1847–1851: Surrey

Career statistics
Competition	First-class
Matches	13
Runs scored	162
Batting average	7.71
100s/50s	–/–
Top score	24*
Balls bowled	–
Wickets	–
Bowling average	–
5 wickets in innings	–
10 wickets in match	–
Best bowling	–
Catches/stumpings	7/–
- Source: Cricinfo, 6 November 2013

Charles Coltson (unknown – 15 March 1852) was an English cricketer active in the 1840s and 1850s, making thirteen appearances in first-class cricket. Christened at Lambeth, Surrey on 20 January 1813, Coltson was a batsman of unknown style who played first-class cricket for three teams.

== Career ==
Coltson made his first-class debut when he was selected to play for the Gentlemen in the Gentlemen v Players fixture of 1843. His next appearance in first-class cricket came in 1846 for the Surrey Club against the Marylebone Cricket Club (MCC), with him playing in the same fixture in 1847. He made his debut for Surrey in 1847 against the MCC at The Oval. Coltson made eight further first-class appearances for the county, the last of which came against Sussex in 1851, as well as making a single appearance for the Surrey Club in 1851 against the MCC. In his thirteen first-class matches, Coltson scored a total of 162 runs at an average of 7.71, with a high score of 24 not out.

He died at Kennington, Surrey on 15 March 1852.
