= Alfred Smith (cricketer, born 1812) =

English cricketer

Alfred Smith (9 July 1812 – 14 January 1892) was an English cricketer notable for his fourteen first-class cricket appearances for Sussex as a gentleman cricketer between 1841 and 1852.

Smith was born in Henfield, Sussex. He played for West Sussex and the Gentlemen of Sussex first in 1839. He played several matches for each against East Sussex, the Players of Sussex, and various Gentlemen teams of Surrey and Hampshire throughout 1839 and 1840. He was invited to first play for Sussex on 14 June 1841 against the Marylebone Cricket Club at Lord's. On his debut he was dismissed for scores of four and one, batting in the lower order.

Smith would face the MCC once more that year, in August at Brighton, before waiting a whole year for his next first-class match. He played, again for Sussex, on 29 August 1842 against an England XI where he was dismissed by William Hillyer for ten. Smith's activities for the next two years are unrecorded, and he does not feature on a cricket scorecard until June 1844, where he played three matches against East sussex and the Gentlemen of Hampshire. He joined Henfield Cricket Club and featured for them against Brighton that year also. In May 1845 he played for Petworth Cricket Club against the MCC, followed by Hampshire and then the MCC once more - all first-class games. He played a Gentlemen v Players game in September 1845, an early County cricket matches in 1851 between Sussex and Kent, and faced the All England XI in 1852 followed by two more outings against Kent. He then played a dozen more games against various Gentlemen's XIs including his final match in 1866. He died in 1892 in Wantley.
