= Francis Buckland (cricketer) =

English cricketer

Francis Matthew Buckland (27 August 1854 – 7 March 1913) was an English first-class cricketer active 1874–91 who played for Middlesex and Oxford University. He was born in Laleham-on-Thames and educated at Eton, where he played cricket for the school 1871–73, and University College, Oxford. He became a schoolteacher and taught briefly at Winchester College before becoming headmaster of a preparatory school at Laleham-on-Thames. He died in Bexhill-on-Sea.
