= Charles Smith (cricketer, born 1838) =

English cricketer

Charles Hamlin Smith (31 August 1838 – 12 March 1909) was an English cricketer active from 1861 to 1874 who played for Sussex and was club captain from 1864 to 1874. He was born in Albourne, Sussex and died in Henfield. He appeared in 63 first-class matches as a righthanded batsman who scored 1,705 runs with a highest score of 95 and took four wickets with a best performance of two for 60.
