= Lucas (surname) =

Lucas is a surname of Latin origin. It is derived from the Latin verb "lucere", meaning "to shine". Notable people with the surname include:

== Academics and science ==
- Alfred Lucas (chemist) (1867–1945), English analytical chemist, known for his part in the excavation of Tutankhamun's tomb
- Arthur Lucas (academic) (born 1941), Australian academic who served as the 18th Principal of King's College London
- Arthur Henry Shakespeare Lucas (1853–1936), English-born Australian schoolmaster and scientist
- Colin Lucas (born 1940), British historian
- Deborah J. Lucas, American economist
- Édouard Lucas (1842–1891), French mathematician who studied Lucas numbers and the closely related Fibonacci numbers (both of which are examples of a Lucas sequence)
- Hippolyte Lucas (1814–1899), French entomologist
- John Lucas (philosopher) (1929–2020), British philosopher
- Robert Lucas Jr. (1937–2023), American economist (Lucas critique)
- Spencer G. Lucas, American paleontologist

== Aristocracy ==
Lucas as an aristocratic family name, Baron Lucas of Crudwell, may refer to:

- Mary Grey, Countess of Kent, 1st Baroness Lucas of Crudwell (died 1702)
- Henry Grey, 1st Duke of Kent, 2nd Baron Lucas of Crudwell (1671–1740)
- Anthony Grey, Earl of Harold, 3rd Baron Lucas of Crudwell (1695–1723)
- Jemima Yorke, 2nd Marchioness Grey, 4th Baroness Lucas of Crudwell (1722–1797)
- Thomas de Grey, 2nd Earl de Grey, 6th Baron Lucas of Crudwell (1781–1859)
- Francis Cowper, 7th Earl Cowper, 8th Baron Lucas of Crudwell (1834–1905)
- Auberon Herbert, 9th Baron Lucas of Crudwell (1876–1916)
- Ralph Palmer, 12th Baron Lucas of Crudwell (born 1951)

== Arts ==
- Buddy Lucas (musician) (1914–1983), American jazz saxophonist and bandleader
- Caroline Byng Lucas (1886–1967), English artist
- Charles Lucas (architect) (1838–1905), French architect
- Charles Lucas (musician) (1808–1869), English cellist
- Charlotte Lucas (born 1976), English actress
- Clarence Lucas (1866–1947), Canadian composer
- Craig Lucas (born 1951), American playwright
- Crystal Lucas-Perry, American stage actress
- David Lucas (born 1937), American music producer and jingle writer
- David Lucas, pseudonym of Steven Blum (born 1965), American voice actor
- Dick Lucas (singer), British vocalist
- E. V. Lucas (1868–1938), British writer
- Frank Lucas (1894–1967), English literary critic
- Gary Lucas, American musician
- Geoffry Lucas (1872–1947), English architect (often mis-spelt Geoffrey)
- George Lucas (born 1944), American filmmaker
- Helen Lucas (born 1931), Canadian artist
- Hippolyte-Julien-Joseph Lucas (1807–1878), French writer and critic
- Isabel Lucas (born 1985), Australian actress
- Isabelle Lucas (1927–1997), British actress and singer
- Jett Lucas (born 1993), American actor, son of George Lucas
- St. John Lucas (1879–1934), English poet and anthologist
- John Lucas (poet) (1937–2025), British poet, critic and travel writer
- John Lucas (comics), American comic book artist
- John Meredyth Lucas (1919–2002), American screenwriter and director
- John Seymour Lucas (1849–1923), British artist
- Josh Lucas (born 1971), American actor
- Joyner Lucas (born 1988), American rapper
- Marcia Lucas (1945–2026), American film editor
- Matt Lucas (singer), American rock and roll, soul and blues singer, drummer and songwriter
- Michael Lucas (director) (born 1972), Russian-Israeli-American pornographic film actor, director, and LGBT activist
- Michael Lucas (political activist) (1926–2020), Canadian artist, designer, and political activist
- Nick Lucas (1897–1982), American jazz guitarist and singer
- Peter J. Lucas (born 1962), Polish and American actor
- Reggie Lucas (1953–2018), American guitarist, songwriter, and producer
- Richard Cockle Lucas (1800–1883), English sculptor
- Sam Lucas (1848–1916), American actor and minstrel performer
- Sarah Lucas (born 1962), British artist
- Scott Lucas (musician), founding member of Local H
- Shannon Lucas, American extreme metal drummer
- Thomas Geoffry Lucas (1872–1947), English architect
- Trevor Lucas (1943–1989), Australian folk-rock musician
- Victor Lucas (television producer), Canadian writer and TV show director
- Vinka Lucas, New Zealand fashion and bridalwear designer
- Wilfred Lucas, Canadian film actor and director

== Law and politics ==
- Allen T. Lucas (1917–1973), American lawyer and politician
- Caroline Lucas (born 1960), English politician
- Charles Lucas (politician) (1713–1771), Irish politician and physician
- Francis Lucas (English politician) (1850–1918), British company director and Conservative Member of Parliament for Lowestoft 1900–1906
- Frank Lucas (Oklahoma politician) (born 1960), American politician
- Frank E. Lucas (1876–1948), American politician
- Sir Frederick Cook, 2nd Baronet (Frederick Lucas Cook, 1844–1920), British politician
- Henry Lucas (politician) (c.1610–1663), British politician and benefactor
- Ian Lucas (born 1960), British politician
- Isaac Benson Lucas (1867–1940), Canadian politician
- Jeanne Hopkins Lucas (c. 1936–2007), American politician
- Louise Lucas (born 1944), Virginia politician
- Malcolm Lucas (1927–2016), American judge
- Michael William George Lucas (1926–2001), British politician, 2nd Lord Lucas of Chilworth
- Raymond B. Lucas (1890–1966), Justice of the Supreme Court of Missouri
- Richard Lucas (politician) (1837–1916), Tasmanian politician
- Robert Lucas (governor) (1781–1853), American politician
- Scott W. Lucas (1892–1968), U.S. Senator and Senate Majority Leader from Illinois

== Military ==
- Alfred Lucas (Indian Army officer) (1822–1896), English staff officer in the British Indian Army
- Alfred George Lucas (1854-1941), British army officer and cricketer
- Benjamin Lucas (soldier), Anglo-Irish soldier of the 17th century
- Charles Lucas (1613–1648), English soldier
- Charles Davis Lucas (1834–1914), Anglo-Irish Royal Navy officer, Victoria Cross recipient
- George W. Lucas (soldier) (1845–1921), American soldier, Medal of Honor recipient
- Jean Jacques Étienne Lucas (1764–1819), French naval officer
- John Lucas (VC) (1827–1892), Irish soldier, recipient of the Victoria Cross after action in New Zealand
- John P. Lucas (1890–1949), American general in World War II
- Steve Lucas, commander of Canadian Forces Air Command

== Sports ==
- A. P. Lucas (1857–1923), English cricketer
- Abraham Lucas (born 1998), American football player
- Antoinette Lucas (born 1968), American field hockey player
- Buddy Lucas (swimmer) (born Frederick Ross Lucas; 1931–2002), New Zealand swimmer
- Chase Lucas (born 1997), American football player
- Colin Lucas (born 1969), Scottish footballer
- Fred Lucas (baseball) (Frederick Warrington Lucas, 1903–1987), American Major League Baseball player
- Gary Lucas (baseball) (born 1954), American baseball player
- Jack Lucas (footballer) (John Lucas, born 1961), Australian rules footballer for Sydney
- Jean Lucas (1917–2003), French racing driver
- Jerry Lucas (born 1940), American basketball player
- John Lucas II (born 1953), American basketball player, NBA
- John Lucas III (born 1982), American basketball player, son of John Lucas II
- John Lucas (cricketer) (1922–2008), West Indian and Canadian cricketer
- John Lucas (footballer) (1869–1953), Australian rules footballer for Geelong
- Johnny Lucas (baseball) (1903–1970), American backup outfielder
- Johnny Lucas (canoeist) (1931–1993), Luxembourgish sprint canoer
- Kalin Lucas (born 1989), American basketball player
- Marquis Lucas (born 1993), American football player
- Maurice Lucas (1952–2010), American basketball player
- Peter Lucas (footballer) (1929–2019), Australian rules footballer
- Ray Lucas (born 1972), American football player
- Ray Lucas (baseball) (1908–1969), American baseball pitcher and manager
- Richard Lucas (rower) (1886–1968), British rower
- Richie Lucas (born 1938), American footballer
- Scott Lucas (footballer) (born 1977), Australian footballer
- Tommy Lucas (1895–1953), English footballer
- Vicente Lucas (1935–2026), Portuguese footballer

== Others ==
- Anthony Francis Lucas (1855–1921), Croatian-born oil-field engineer
- Arthur Lucas (1907-1962), American criminal, one of the last two people to be executed in Canada
- Clorinda Low Lucas (née Elizabeth Jessemine Kauikeolani Low; 1895–1986) American Hawaiian social worker
- Colin Anderson Lucas (1906–1984), modernist architect, pioneer of reinforced concrete construction
- Dick Lucas (minister) (born 1925), British evangelical speaker
- Edward Lucas, one of several people:
- Eliza Lucas (c.1722–1793), Antiguan-born plantation manager
- Francis Lucas, one of several people including:
- Frank Lucas (drug lord) (1930–2019), American drug dealer
- Frederick Lucas (1812–1855), British journalist
- Frederic Augustus Lucas (1852–1929), American anatomist and museum director
- Harold Gene Lucas (1951–2026), American convicted child killer
- Henry Lee Lucas (1936–2001), American serial killer
- Inah Canabarro Lucas (1908–2025), Brazilian nun and supercentenarian
- James Lucas, multiple people
- Jim G. Lucas (1914–1970), American journalist
- Sir John Lucas, 1st Baron Lucas of Shenfield (1606–1671), brother of Charles Lucas
- Joseph Lucas (1834–1902), founder of the British automotive electrical components manufacturer Lucas Automotive, LucasVarity
- Ken Lucas (disambiguation), multiple people
- Margaret Bright Lucas (1818-1890), British temperance activist and suffragist
- Martha Lucas Pate (1912–1983), American college administrator
- Matt Lucas (born 1974), British comedian
- Nathaniel Lucas (1764–1818), English convict transported to Australia
- Netley Lucas (c. 1903–1940), English confidence trickster
- Ove Lucas (born ca. 1960), Dutch curator and director
- Pauline Ramart, nee Lucas (1880–1953), French chemist and a politician.
- Ralph Lucas (1876-1955), designer of early motor cars
- Richard Lucas, one of several people including:
  - Richard Lucas (priest) (c. 1640–1715), Welsh clergyman
- Samuel Lucas (1811–1865), British abolitionist and newspaper editor
- Samuel Lucas (1805–1870), 'Senior" - British brewer and painter
- Thomas Lucas (Royalist) (d. 1649), English Cavalier, brother of and John and Charles
- Thomas Lucas (MP for Grampound) (c. 1720–1784), English MP and West Indies merchant
- Thomas Pennington Lucas (1843–1917), Scottish-born Australian medical practitioner
- Vrain Denis-Lucas, French forger
- Werner Lucas, German pilot
- William John Lucas, English teacher and entomologist

== See also ==
- Luca (surname)
- Lucas (disambiguation)
- Lukas
- Luke (name)
- Lukis
