= Charles Lucas (disambiguation) =

Charles Lucas (1613–1648) was a Royalist general in the English Civil War.

Charles Lucas may also refer to:

- Charles Lucas (cricketer, born 1843) (1843–1919), English cricketer
- Charles Lucas (cricketer, born 1853) (1853–1928), English cricketer
- Charles Lucas (cricketer, born 1885) (1885–1967), English cricketer
- Charles Lucas (politician) (1713–1771), Irish politician and physician
- Charles Lucas (Missouri lawyer) (1792–1817), Missouri lawyer
- Charles (Jean-Marie) Lucas (1803–1889), French lawyer and prison reformer
- Charles Lucas (musician) (1808–1869), British cellist
- Charles Lucas (sport shooter) (1886–1975), British Olympic shooter
- Charles Lucas Anthony (1960–1983), one of the commanders of the LTTE rebel group in Sri Lanka
- Charles Lucas (Royal Navy officer) (1834–1914), Irish-born Royal Navy rear admiral and holder of the Victoria Cross
- Charles Prestwood Lucas (1853–1931), civil servant and historian
- Charles Lucas (architect) (1838–1905), French architect and writer
- Red Lucas (Charles Fred Lucas, 1902–1986), American baseball player
- Charles Lucas (actor), co-star of Oscar Micheaux's film The Homesteader
