= Alfred Lucas (cricketer, born 1854) =

English first-class cricketer, businessman and British Army officer (1854–1941)

Personal information
- Full name: Alfred George Lucas
- Born: 26 October 1854; Wandsworth, Surrey, England
- Died: 4 May 1941 (aged 86); Hove, Sussex, England
- Batting: Unknown
- Relatives: Charles Lucas (brother); Frederick Lucas (brother); Morton Lucas (brother); Charles Lucas (nephew)

Domestic team information
- Years: Team
- 1880: Marylebone Cricket Club

Career statistics
Competition	First-class
Matches	1
Runs scored	46
Batting average	46.00
100s/50s	–/–
Top score	46
Catches/stumpings	–/–
- Source: Cricinfo, 21 October 2021

Alfred George Lucas CB MVO JP (26 October 1854 – 4 May 1941) was an English first-class cricketer, businessman and British Army officer.

The son of the businessman Charles Thomas Lucas, who founded the building business Lucas Brothers, he was born at Wandsworth in October 1854. After receiving a private education, Lucas joined the 17th Suffolk Rifle Volunteer Corps as a sub-lieutenant in July 1873, before resigning his commission nearly two years later in May 1875. Lucas was from a cricketing family which included his brothers Charles, Frederick and Morton. He made a single first-class appearance for the Marylebone Cricket Club (MCC) against Sussex at Lord's in 1880. Batting once in the match, he was dismissed in the MCC's only innings for 46 runs by James Lillywhite. After a brief period in the 1st Norfolk Artillery Volunteers, from which he resigned with the rank of lieutenant in February 1882, Lucas was commissioned into the Suffolk Yeomanry in July 1883. Promotion to captain followed in January 1887, with him gaining the rank of major in July 1889.

At the beginning of the 1890s, Lucas was promoted to lieutenant colonel, with him also establishing a number of business roles outside of the military in this decade. He was a partner in Lucas Brothers and Lucas and Aird, and held directorships in the Suffolk-based brewing firm E. Lacon and Company's Brewery, as well as in the Dublin based Darcy and Company's Brewery. He was a prominent figure in Lowestoft and served two terms as mayor in 1896 and 1898. Having been made an honorary colonel in October 1897, With conflict brewing the British and the Boer Republics in South Africa, Lucas suggested to the War Office that yeomanry should be used in the coming conflict. In response, George Wyndham established a committee of "influential and patriotic gentlemen" which Lucas sat on alongside Lord Chesham and Viscount Valentia. With a decision reached to use the irregular yeomanry to fight the irregular Boer forces, Lucas travelled to South Africa where he saw action in the Second Boer War and was mentioned in dispatches.

Lucas was made a member of the Royal Victorian Order, 4th Class in July 1901, in connection with helping to raise the Imperial Yeomanry. In 1902, he was made a companion to the Order of the Bath. Following the end of the war, he resigned his commission from the Imperial Yeomanry in February 1903 and was granted the honorary rank of colonel in the regular army. He served as High Sheriff of Suffolk in 1904, in addition to serving as a justice of the peace for the county. From 1904, his business interests moved into insurance, where he was chairman of the Rock Life Assurance Company. Having retained his commission in the Suffolk Yeomanry, Lucas resigned his commission in April 1907. Lucas died at Hove in May 1941.
