= Aston Martin DBR4 =

Formula One racing car

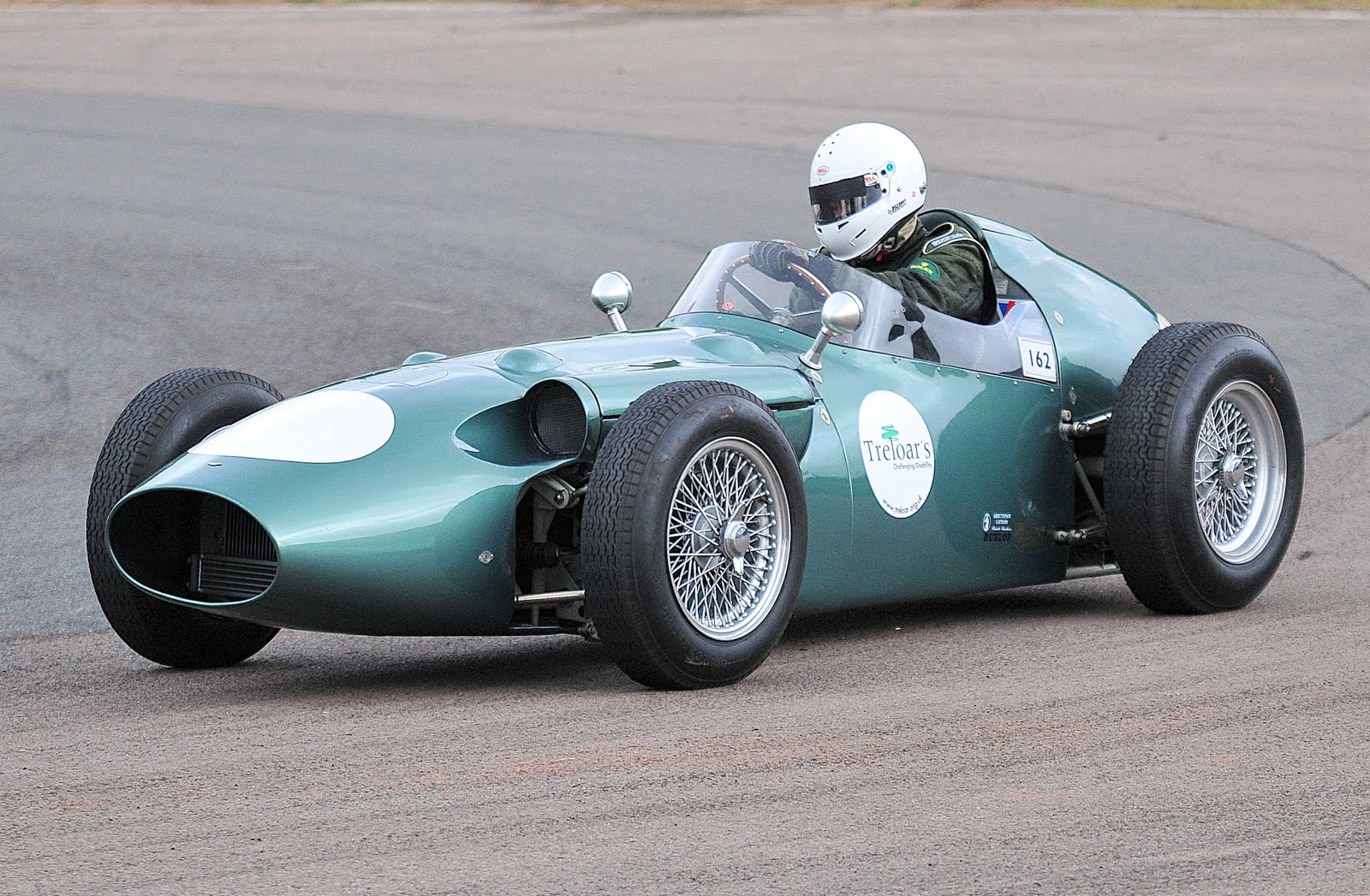
- Category: Formula One
- Constructor: Aston Martin
- Designer: Ted Cutting
- Successor: Aston Martin DBR5

Technical specifications
- Chassis: Steel spaceframe.
- Suspension (front): Double wishbone, with coilover spring/damper units.
- Suspension (rear): de Dion tube, located by trailing arms, with torsion bars.
- Axle track: 1,308 mm (51.50 in)
- Wheelbase: 2,362 mm (92.99 in)
- Engine: Aston Martin RB6 2,493 cc (152.1 cu in) DOHC straight-6. Naturally aspirated, front-mounted.
- Transmission: David Brown CG537 5-speed manual.
- Weight: 575 kg (1,268 lb)
- Tyres: 1959: Avon; 1960: Dunlop

Competition history
- Notable entrants: David Brown Corporation
- Notable drivers: (United Kingdom) Roy Salvadori (United States) Carroll Shelby
- Debut: 1959 Dutch Grand Prix
Races	Wins	Poles	F/Laps
5	0	0	0
- Unless otherwise stated, all data refer to Formula One World Championship Grands Prix only.

The Aston Martin DBR4/250, commonly referred to simply as the DBR4, is a Formula One racing car, designed by Ted Cutting for the sports car manufacturer Aston Martin. Following notable successes in sports car racing during the mid- to late-1950s – culminating in winning the 24 Hours of Le Mans endurance race and the World Sportscar Championship title in 1959 – the DBR4 was intended to repeat this success in the highest tier of open-wheel racing.

The DBR4 was largely based on the DB3S sportscar, and borrowed that vehicle's basic chassis and engine layout. Although it was tested as early as 1957, the DBR4 did not make its World Championship debut until the 1959 Dutch Grand Prix, driven by Roy Salvadori and Carroll Shelby. However, its long gestation period meant that by the time it finally entered competition much of its concept and technology had been superseded, and the car was not a success. The DBR4 was replaced by the lighter Aston Martin DBR5/250 in early 1960, but when that car also failed to provide competitive results Aston Martin abandoned Formula One to concentrate on their more successful sports car projects.

== Design ==
A potential open-wheeled Aston Martin racing car had been discussed as early as 1955, and a hastily constructed prototype was tested in the Australian and New Zealand races in early 1956, driven by Reg Parnell. Following successes in this Antipodean experiment, and despite the majority of Aston's racing department being fully occupied with the sports car program, Aston Martin decided to pursue a Formula One entry in earnest. However, the company's emphasis on sports car competitions meant that attention was often diverted from the Formula One program, and development delays were common almost from the outset.

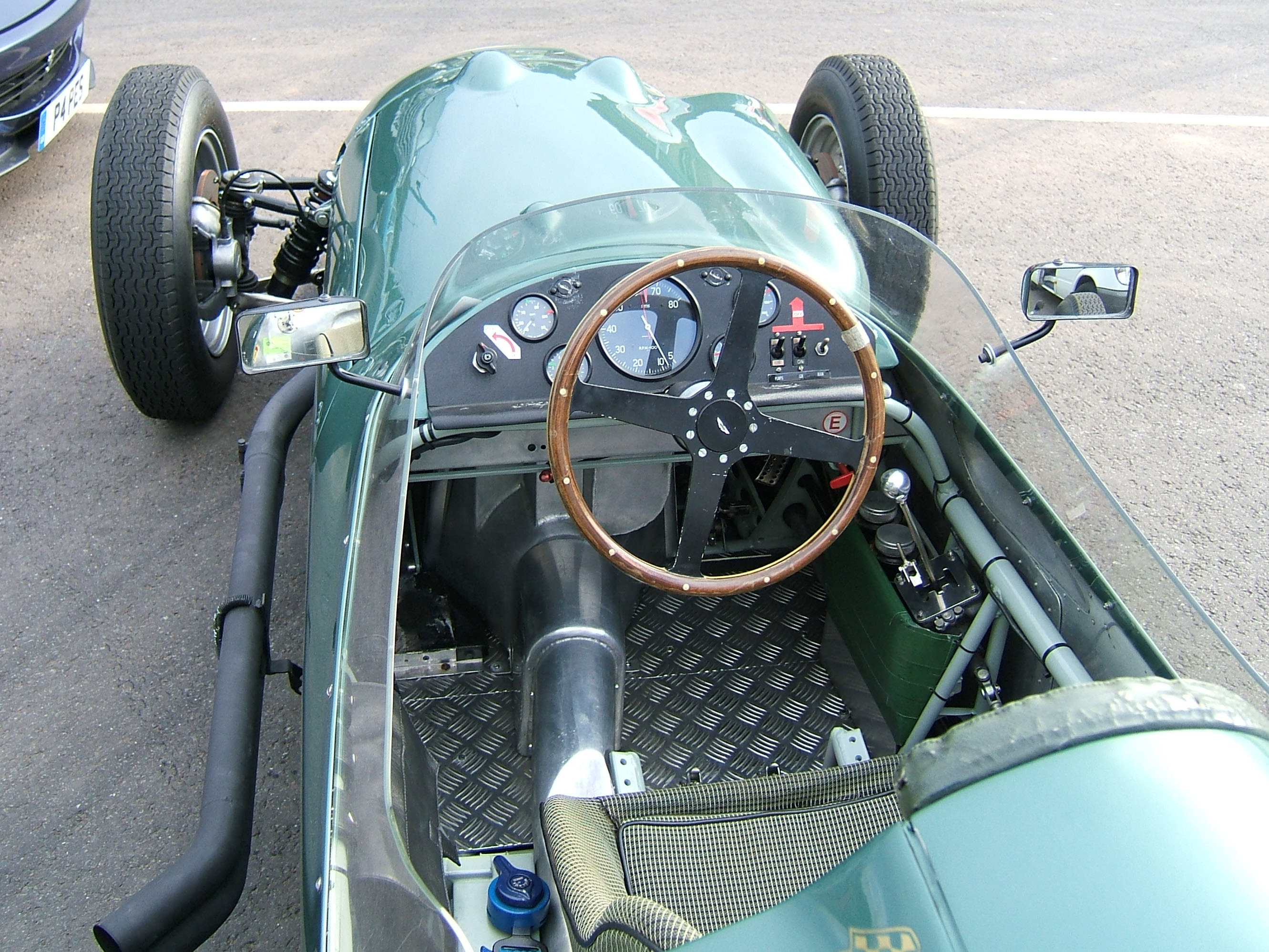
The cockpit of an Aston Martin DBR4, showing the generous proportions of the chassis and details of its spaceframe construction.

Building on Aston Martin's established road car and sports racer template, the chassis of the DBR4 was a conventional spaceframe structure, skinned with aluminium bodywork. Beneath the skin the DBR4's basic design was closely related to the DB3S sports car of 1956, but with its ancillary components more tightly packaged to enclose them in the smaller, single-seater body. Although some manufacturers had started to use wind-tunnel testing for racing cars, such as the Bristol 450, aerodynamics as a science was still in its infancy where road vehicles were concerned. As a result of this, although the DBR4's bodywork appeared svelte and streamlined, the effect was ruined by the decision to mount a large air intake on the side of the bonnet, and to install a relatively tall, near-vertical windscreen.

Suspension was handled by double wishbones with coil springs and telescopic dampers at the front, and a de Dion tube system with torsion bar springs at the rear. While this arrangement had been state-of-the-art in the early years of the 1950s, by the time that the DBR4 made its first public appearance most racing car manufacturers were moving to all-round independent suspension, offering better handling, traction and road-holding than the older system employed at the rear of the Aston. The DBR4 was the last new Grand Prix car to use the de Dion system. This same suspension system would be adapted to the DBR3 sports car which was being developed at the same time as the DBR4, but would be abandoned less than a year later when the DBR3 was considered a failure. To bring the car to a halt, Girling disc brakes were fitted all round.

The DBR4 also shared the basic double overhead camshaft straight-6 Aston Martin engine design with its brethren, but sleeved to reduce its capacity to 2.5-litres. Although Tadek Marek's design was a reliable and powerful unit in its 3.7-litre road car form, the reduced capacity racing motor was hard-pressed to cope with the heavy chassis and poor aerodynamics, and frequent engine failures blighted the DBR4's brief racing career. Aston Martin claimed a 280 bhp (210 kW) output for the DBR4's engine. However, it was common practice at the time to overquote engine power, and a more realistic value is closer to 250 bhp (190 kW). This value is still higher than that provided by the Coventry Climax FPF straight-4, used by contemporary manufacturers such as Lotus and Cooper, but the Aston Martin engine weighed appreciably more. The engine drove the rear wheels through a proprietary David Brown gearbox, provided by Aston Martin's owners.

A total of four Aston Martin DBR4/250s were built between 1957 and 1959, with three surviving to date. Recognising their failings, the Aston Martin race team reworked the DBR4 into the DBR5 for the 1960 season. The DBR5 was smaller and lighter, and engine modifications meant that the power output was finally close to the figure originally claimed by the Aston Martin workshop. The DBR5 also boasted all-independent suspension, but results did not improve from those of the DBR4 and both DBR5s were eventually broken up.

== Competition career ==
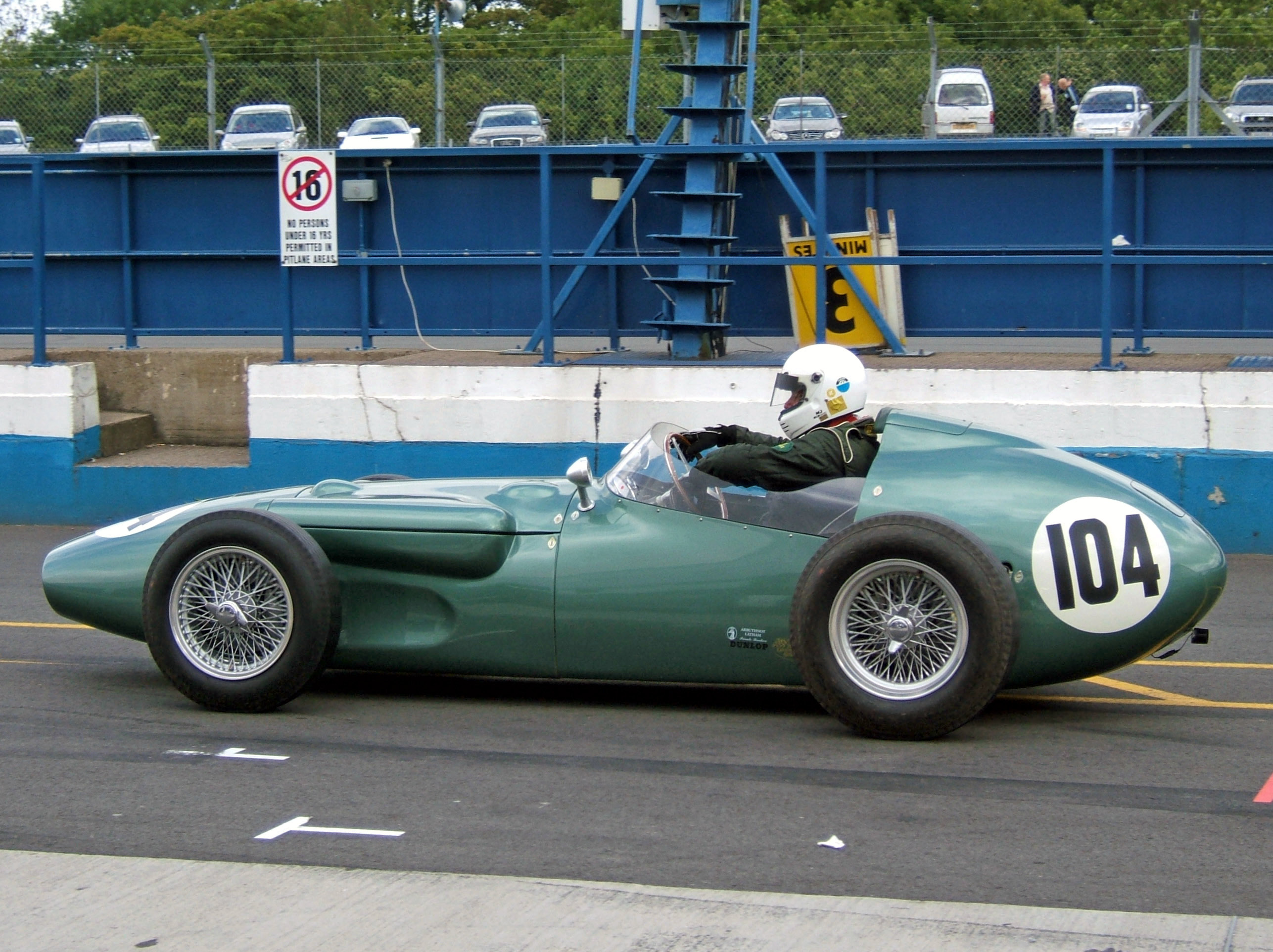
The Aston Martin DBR4 had a sleek bodywork shape, broken by large air intakes and upright windscreen.

The Aston Martin DBR4/250 was unveiled to the public in April 1959, and made its competition debut on 2 May in the non-Championship BRDC International Trophy race at Silverstone. Two cars were entered, for works drivers Roy Salvadori and Carroll Shelby. Salvadori immediately began to show some promise in the car, posting third fastest time in qualifying, beaten only by fellow Britons Stirling Moss and Tony Brooks, driving a BRP BRM P25 and works Ferrari 246 Dino respectively. Shelby also posted some fast lap times, taking sixth place. In the race both Brooks and Moss retired with mechanical problems, but the Astons performed faultlessly for the majority of the distance, before Shelby's oil pump failed two laps from the finish. He placed sixth, two laps down. However, Salvadori was well-placed and competing hard for the lead. He posted the fastest lap of the race, en route to finishing second behind Jack Brabham's works Cooper-Climax. Unfortunately for Aston Martin, the DBR4's debut performance flattered to deceive.

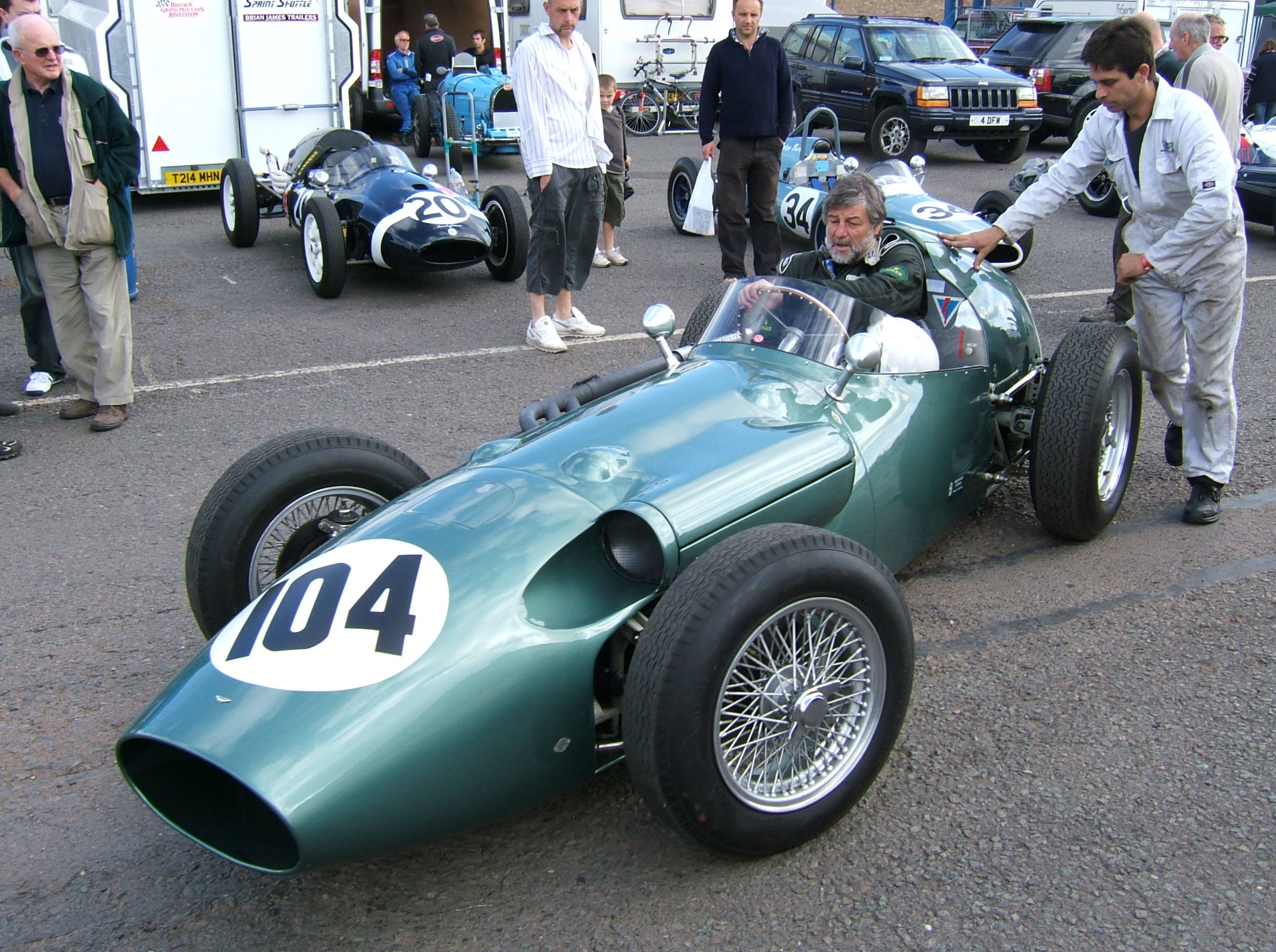
A DBR4 is push-started in the paddock at Donington Park, 2007.

At the DBR4's World Championship debut in the 1959 Dutch Grand Prix on 31 May, Shelby and Salvadori could only manage 10th and 13th fastest in qualification, respectively. During the race both cars succumbed to engine problems in the early laps and failed to finish. Further delays and shifted priorities meant that the light green Astons only appeared at a further three races of the 1959 Formula One season. The DBR4s failed to score even a single point during this time; their best results being a pair of 6th places for Salvadori, taken at the British and Portuguese rounds. Following a second disappointing outing in the BRDC International Trophy (Trintignant was tenth and Salvadori's engine expired on lap 4), a solitary DBR4 appeared in practice for the 1960 Dutch Grand Prix, entered for Salvadori when the DBR5 was not ready. The car was saved further possible embarrassment when a starting money dispute caused Aston Martin to withdraw prior to the start.

The coda to the DBR4's racing career came in mid-1960, when a car was shipped to Australia for local racers Lex Davison and Bib Stillwell to compete in the Australian and New Zealand national championship Formula Libre races. Fitted with a 3.0-litre engine the car performed much better than had been the case during its brief Formula One life, and Davison took second place in the 1960 Australian Grand Prix. To reflect the increase in engine capacity this car was officially known as the DBR4/300. Stillwell retained the DBR4/300 until the end of the 1962–63 season.

== Complete Formula One World Championship results ==
(key)

Year	Entrant	Engine	Tyres	Drivers	1	2	3	4	5	6	7	8	9	10	Points	WCC
1959	David Brown Corporation	Aston Martin DOHC straight-6	A		MON	500	NED	FRA	GBR	GER	POR	ITA	USA		0	-
1959	David Brown Corporation	Aston Martin DOHC straight-6	A	Roy Salvadori			Ret		6		6	Ret			0	-
1959	David Brown Corporation	Aston Martin DOHC straight-6	A	Carroll Shelby			Ret		Ret		8	10			0	-
1960	David Brown Corporation	Aston Martin DOHC straight-6	D		ARG	MON	500	NED	BEL	FRA	GBR	POR	ITA	USA	0	-
1960	David Brown Corporation	Aston Martin DOHC straight-6	D	Roy Salvadori				DNS							0	-

== Non-Championship results ==
(key) (Races in bold indicate pole position) (Races in italics indicate fastest lap)

Year	Entrant	Engine	Tyres	Driver	1	2	3	4	5	6	7
1959	David Brown Corporation	Aston Martin DOHC straight-6	A		GLV	AIN	INT	IGC	SCT		
1959	David Brown Corporation	Aston Martin DOHC straight-6	A	Roy Salvadori			2				
1959	David Brown Corporation	Aston Martin DOHC straight-6	A	Carroll Shelby			6				
1960	David Brown Corporation	Aston Martin DOHC straight-6	D		RSA	CBA	GLV	INT	SCT	LOM	IGC
1960	David Brown Corporation	Aston Martin DOHC straight-6	D	Roy Salvadori				Ret			
1960	David Brown Corporation	Aston Martin DOHC straight-6	D	Maurice Trintignant				10			
