= Alfred Lucas =

Alfred Lucas may refer to:

- Alfred Lucas (Indian Army officer) (1822–1896), British staff officer in the British Indian Army
- Alfred Lucas (cricketer, born 1854) (1854–1941), English first-class cricketer, businessman and British Army officer
- A. P. Lucas (1857–1923), English cricketer
- Alfred Lucas (chemist) (1867–1945), English analytical chemist, best known for his part in the excavation of Tutankhamun's tomb
