= Aston Martin RB6 engine =

Aston Martin RB6

Overview
- Manufacturer: (United Kingdom) Aston Martin
- Production: 1959–1960

Layout
- Configuration: 95° I-6, naturally-aspirated
- Displacement: 2.5 L (153 cu in)
- Cylinder bore: 83 mm (3.3 in)
- Piston stroke: 90 mm (3.5 in)
- Valvetrain: 24-valve, DOHC, four-valves per cylinder
- Compression ratio: 9.8:1

Combustion
- Fuel system: Carburetor
- Oil system: Dry sump

Output
- Power output: 250–280 hp (186–209 kW)
- Torque output: 208–235 lb⋅ft (282–319 N⋅m)

Dimensions
- Dry weight: 203 kg (448 lb)

The Aston Martin RB6 is a 2.5-litre, naturally-aspirated, inline-6 racing engine, developed and designed by Aston Martin for Formula One racing; used between 1959 and 1960. The RB6 also shared the basic double-overhead camshaft straight-6 Aston Martin engine design with its brethren, but sleeved to reduce its capacity to 2.5-litres. Although Tadek Marek's design was a reliable and powerful unit in its 3.7-litre road car form, the reduced capacity racing motor was hard-pressed to cope with the heavy chassis and poor aerodynamics, and frequent engine failures blighted the DBR4's brief racing career. Aston Martin claimed a 280 bhp (210 kW) output for the DBR4's engine. However, it was common practice at the time to overquote engine power, and a more realistic value is closer to 250 bhp (190 kW). This value is still higher than that provided by the Coventry Climax FPF straight-4, used by contemporary manufacturers such as Lotus and Cooper, but the Aston Martin engine weighed appreciably more. The engine drove the rear wheels through a proprietary David Brown gearbox, provided by Aston Martin's owners.

The DBR5's engine was smaller and lighter. The new engine modifications meant that the power output was finally close to the figure originally claimed by the Aston Martin workshop.

== Applications ==
- Aston Martin DBR4
- Aston Martin DBR5
