= Aston Martin DBR5 =

Formula One racing car

- Category: Formula One
- Constructor: Aston Martin
- Designer: Ted Cutting
- Predecessor: Aston Martin DBR4
- Successor: Aston Martin AMR21

Technical specifications
- Chassis: Steel spaceframe
- Engine: Aston Martin RB6 2.5 L (150 cu in) DOHC straight-6 Naturally aspirated, front-mounted
- Transmission: Aston Martin 5-speed manual
- Weight: 575 kg (1,268 lb)
- Tyres: Dunlop

Competition history
- Notable entrants: David Brown Corporation
- Notable drivers: (United Kingdom) Roy Salvadori (France) Maurice Trintignant
- Debut: 1960 British Grand Prix
| Races | Wins | Poles | F/Laps |
|---|---|---|---|
| 1 | 0 | 0 | 0 |
- Unless otherwise stated, all data refer to Formula One World Championship Grands Prix only.

The Aston Martin DBR5 (also known as DBR5/250) was a Formula One racing car, designed by the sports car manufacturer Aston Martin. Following the poor results of the Aston Martin DBR4 in the 1959 Formula One season the lighter and smaller DBR5 was intended to be quicker than its predecessor. However following poor results in 1960, Aston Martin decided to withdraw from Formula One, eventually returning in 2021.

== Design ==
The Aston Martin DBR5 was largely based on the 1959 car, the Aston Martin DBR4. It used the same basic chassis and engine layout. Improvements to the DBR5 made it smaller and lighter, and engine modifications meant that the power output was finally close to the figure originally claimed by the Aston Martin workshop. The DBR5 also boasted all-independent suspension.

But when that car also failed to provide competitive results against the strengthening rear mounted engined cars, Aston Martin abandoned Formula One to concentrate on their more successful sports car projects.

Two DBR5s were constructed in early 1960, but both were scrapped in 1961 following Aston Martin's withdrawal from Formula One.

== Complete Formula One World Championship results ==
(key)

| Year | Entrant | Engine | Tyres | Drivers | 1 | 2 | 3 | 4 | 5 | 6 | 7 | 8 | 9 | 10 | Points | WCC |
|---|---|---|---|---|---|---|---|---|---|---|---|---|---|---|---|---|
| 1960 | David Brown Corporation | Aston Martin DOHC straight-6 | D | | ARG | MON | 500 | NED | BEL | FRA | GBR | POR | ITA | USA | 0 | - |
| 1960 | David Brown Corporation | Aston Martin DOHC straight-6 | D | Roy Salvadori | | | | | | | Ret | | | | 0 | - |
| 1960 | David Brown Corporation | Aston Martin DOHC straight-6 | D | Maurice Trintignant | | | | | | | 11 | | | | 0 | - |
