= Frank Lucas (disambiguation) =

Frank Lucas (1930–2019) was an American drug dealer.

Frank Lucas may also refer to:

- Frank Lucas (cricketer) (1888-1941), Australian cricketer
- Frank Lucas (Oklahoma politician) (born 1960), American legislator
- Frank Lucas (Wyoming politician) (1876–1948), American governor
- F. L. Lucas (Frank Laurence Lucas, 1894–1967), English literary critic
- J. Frank Lucas, American actor in 1964's The Curse of the Living Corpse
- Frankie Lucas (1953-2023), Vincentian boxer, English champion 1972–73
- Frank Lucas, American character in A-Haunting We Will Go
- Frank Lucas (graphic designer) (born 1930), American illustrator, designer, and photographer

== See also ==
- "Mr. Frank Lucas", track 17 on 2009 album Draped Up and Chipped Out, Vol. 4
- Francis Lucas (disambiguation)
- Lucas (surname)
