= Ralph Lucas =

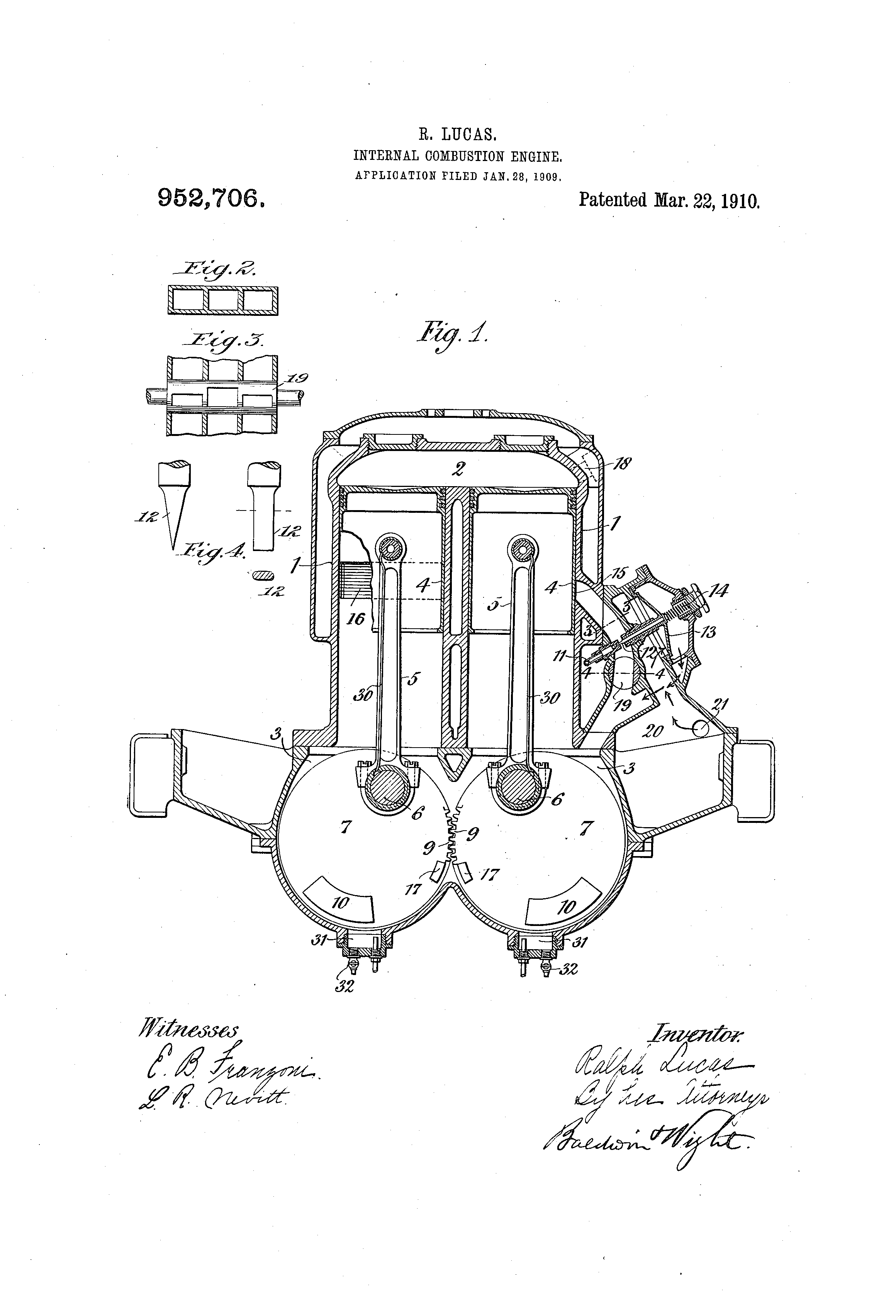
Patent Drawing by Ralph Lucas in US Patent US952706A

Ralph Lucas (1876-1955) was an entrepreneur and inventor, involved in the design and manufacturing of early motor cars. He was born in Greenwich, the son of telegraph engineer Francis Robert Lucas (1849-1931) and his wife Katherine. After studying at Jesus College, Cambridge, Lucas began his career as a draughtsman. But by the turn of the century he had established his own workshop (at Westcombe Hill, Greenwich), joining the Institute of Mechanical Engineers in 1903. At the workshop, he began designing motor cars, registering 15 UK and three US patents between 1899 and 1910 for a range of different engine parts.

This led to the Ralph Lucas Car, developed from 1901 until around 1908. The first model was an odd two-stroke car powered by paraffin; it had a piston and a crankshaft at either end of its one cylinder. A button in the steering wheel controlled the speed of the engine. The coachwork was of pressed steel. The two-stroke design introduced in 1908 was the origin of the Valveless. After 1908 production moved to David Brown and Sons of Huddersfield. However, only a small number were ever made.

The car was test driven for an article in The Engineer journal which reported, 'On the high gear the car travelled up long and steep gradients without necessitating change to the low gear’ it wrote, hailing the vehicle as ‘a highly meritorious attempt to adapt a two-cycle internal combustion engine to the propulsion of road vehicles.’ In 1922 Ralph Lucas developed a second car, the North-Lucas Radial, with Oliver North at the Robin Hood Engineering Works in Putney Vale. This time only one was built (by the Chelsea Motor Building Co), and it was used by Ralph himself between 1922 and 1928, covering 65,000 miles in its lifetime.

Lucas married the pianist and composer Mary Anderson Juler in 1903, and they had two sons, Anthony Ralph Lucas (1905-?) and Colin Anderson Lucas (1906-1984). Lucas established a building firm (Lucas, Lloyd & Co.) which his son Colin joined in 1929. Colin Lucas became a renowned modernist architect and pioneer of reinforced concrete construction. In 1930 he built Noah's House and Boathouse in Cookham for his parents to live in. Mary Lucas established a music room there. It is now a Grade II listed building.

== See also ==
- List of car manufacturers of the United Kingdom
