= Anne Esdall =

Irish printer, publisher and bookseller

- Born: Anne Middleton; Circa 1718
- Died: Circa 1795
- Occupation(s): Printer, publisher, bookseller
- Spouse: James Esdall
- Children: 4

Anne Esdall (née Middleton; c. 1718 – c. 1795) was an Irish printer, publisher, and bookseller.

== Life ==
Anne Esdall was born Anne Middleton around 1718. She married the printer, publisher, and bookseller, James Esdall, on 31 August 1745. In her husband's absences due to legal issues regarding the content of his newspapers The Censor, or Citizen's Journal and The Censor Extraordinary, Esdall would run his printing shop from Copper-Alley on Cork Hill, Dublin. This led to serious financial and emotional distress. Esdall kept The General News-letter, also known as Esdall's News-letter from 1745–1755, going while raising the couple's four children.

It was unusual for women to be involved in the print trade in the 1700s, the small number of women running businesses were widows who inherited them. She was examined by the Irish House of Commons in December 1749 when she was asked to reveal the identity of an author from her husband's publications who wrote "scandalous" paragraphs, which she did. The author was Charles Lucas, a controversial politician, with whom James Esdall had a long relationship. As a result of the session in the House of Commons, copies of the Censor and other works by Lucas were burned publicly and the Guild of St Luke was warned to control its members.

Her husband returned to Dublin in 1750, and continued to publish controversial works including The case and tryal of John Peter Zenger (1750), but his health had been affected by the Lucas case. He died on 24 March 1755, at which time Esdall intended to carry on the business. However, in June 1755 she sold the printing materials, shop stock, and household furniture. The News-letter was taken over by her husband's apprentice, Henry Saunders, in 1755 and he renamed it the Saunder's News-letter. Lucas' reputation was later rehabilitated and he was elected MP in 1761.

Esdall petitioned the Guild of St Luke for relief in 1768, and later in 1795 due to "distressed circumstances" following the death of her son and was granted three guineas. It is likely she died soon after this date. The Esdalls had four children, including the artist and engraver, William Esdall (c. 1750 – 1795).

== See also ==
- List of women printers and publishers before 1800
