= Mary Lucas =

English composer (1882–1952)

Mary Lucas (born Mary Anderson Juler, 24 May 1882–14 January 1952), sometimes referred to as Mary Anderson Lucas, was an English composer and pianist.

== Biography ==
Her father Henry Juler (1842-1921) was a doctor, and her mother Amy Margaret Churchill Anderson (1860-1922). She was one of five children, growing up in London and (from 1891) Chipstead in Surrey. In 1899 she studied piano at the Dresden Conservatory with Carlo Albanesi, then (1900-1903) at the Royal Academy of Music, and later in life, during the 1920s, she returned to education, studying composition at the Royal College of Music with Herbert Howells and R.O. Morris. She married entrepreneur and inventor Ralph Lucas in 1903, and their son Colin became a noted architect. During the 1920s and 1930s they were living a 10, St Germans Place, Blackheath, London SE13. They later moved to Cookham in Berkshire.

== Music ==
Lucas gave up composition for over 25 years after she married in 1903 and had a family (two sons and a daughter), but returned in the late 1920s, when the Bournemouth Municipal Orchestra performed her Rhapsody (1928) and Fugue (1929). By the early 1930s she had produced a number of successful compositions, including six string quartets. The Stratton String Quartet championed her music, performing her quartets for the London Music Club's First Performance Society on 29 November 1934 at 22 Holland Park, and in January 1935 at the Blackheath Concert Halls. There was a BBC broadcast of the third quartet by the all female Macnaghten Quartet on 4 February 1936.

Lucas also composed ballet music, including Cupid and Death and Undine, both 1936. Her circus-themed ballet Sawdust was performed in London and Wolverhampton in 1941 by the Ballet Guild, under the direction of (no relation) Leighton Lucas. It was later orchestrated as the Circus Suite, which was conducted by Henry Wood at the Royal Albert Hall on 4 July 1942, giving Lucus her Proms debut at the age of sixty.

Lucas had a special affinity with the clarinet, and may have encouraged her niece Pauline Juler (1914-2003) to become a professional clarinetist. (Juler later became associated with the clarinet music of composers such as York Bowen, Gerald Finzi and Howard Ferguson). Her Clarinet Sonata was written for Juler in 1938. Around this time she was also performing duo recitals with the clarinetist Rudolph Dunbar, and a recording of them playing her Lament for clarinet and piano was issued by Octacros Records in the late-1930s.

Her papers (including some recordings) are partially housed at the British Library, while some manuscripts and other papers are held at the Guildhall School of Music and Drama. A Lucas family archive is held at the Dennis Sharpe Archive, Paul Mellon Center, Yale University.

== Family and friends ==
Her husband Ralph Lucas was involved in the design and manufacturing of early motor cars, including the Ralph Lucas Car, developed from 1901 until around 1908. He died in 1955. Their son Colin Lucas (1906-1984) was an architect and a pioneer of reinforced concrete construction. He married the chef Dione Lucas (Wilson) in 1945. Colin Lucas built Noah's Boathouse in Cookham for his parents. Mary Lucas established a music room there, where musical and philosophical gatherings were held. (Mary and Colin were followers of the Russian esotericist P. D. Ouspensky). Participants in these gatherings may have included friends such as Paul Nash, Alain Daniélou and Edmund Rubbra.

== Works ==
Selected works include:

Orchestral

- Capriccio for saxophone and string orchestra
- Circus Suite (1939) (pub. Peters)
- Concertino for flute and orchestra (1940)
- Five Tunes for Small Orchestra
- Fugue for strings (1939)
- Occasional Overture (before 1935, fp 22 November 1940, Arts Theatre Club)
- Rhapsody for orchestra (performed in Bournemouth, April 1928)
- Suite for chamber orchestra (before 1935)
- Variations on a Theme by Purcell for string orchestra (1938) (pub. Peters)
- Ballet Preludes (1941, orchestrated 1945)

Chamber Music

- Clarinet Sonata (1938) (pub. Hinrichsen)
- Complainte et Rapsodie for clarinet and piano
- Duo for clarinet and viola (1941)
- Fugue for flute, oboe and viola (before 1935)
- Lament and Rhapsody for clarinet and piano (before 1935)
- Rhapsody for flute, cello and piano (1946)
- String Quartet No 1
- String Quartet No 2 (1933)
- String Quartet No 3 (1935)
- Trio for clarinet, viola and piano (1939)
- Violin Sonata (performance 4 November 1930, Blackheath)
- Woodwind Quintet for clarinet, flute, oboe, bassoon, horn (early 1930s?)

Vocal

- Choeurs isolés, choral
- The Hour of Magic (text: W H Davies)
- Sleeping Sea and Lullaby, two choral part songs (1939), pub. Chester
- Songs for two part choir (OUP)
  - Dandelion Down
  - Duck's Ditty
  - Evening Song
  - Thunder at Night
  - The Wind (text: James Stephens)

Ballet and Dramatic

- Cupid and Death, ballet (1936)
- Undine (1936)
- Sciure (piano-flute-string quintet), ballet (1941)
- The Book of Thel, masque for solo voices, chorus, chamber orchestra, and male and female narrators (1935)
- Musiques de scène, masque
- Sawdust, ballet (fp 21 May 1941, Wulfrun Hall Wolverhampton) (orchestrated as Circus Suite)
