= James Lucas =

James Lucas may refer to:

- James Lucas (bishop) (1867–1938), Anglican bishop
- James Lucas (hermit) (1813–1874), English Victorian eccentric and hermit
- James Lucas (illustrator) (1903–?), British artist
- James Lucas (screenwriter), New Zealand screenwriter and producer
- Jim Lucas (politician), member of the Indiana House of Representatives
- James C. Lucas (1912–1998), American criminal, took part in an attempted escape from Alcatraz Penitentiary in 1938
- Jim G. Lucas (1914–1970), war correspondent for Scripps-Howard Newspapers
- Jay Lucas (James Howle Lucas, born 1957), American politician and attorney
- James Hunt Lucas (1800–1873), St. Louis businessman and politician
- James P. Lucas (1927–2020), American politician in the state of Montana
- James Steve Lucas (born 1952), Canadian Forces Air Command general

== See also ==
- Jamie Lucas (born 1995), Welsh footballer
