= Hilda Gaunt =

British pianist

Hilda Gaunt (1906 – 10 October 1975) was rehearsal pianist with The Royal Ballet for over 40 years.

Gaunt first attracted attention as a pianist and accompanist in the late 1920s and early 1930s. In 1931 she became the accompanist at the Vic Wells (later Sadler's Wells) Ballet Company, also working with musical director Constant Lambert on the musical supervision of classic ballet scores.

During wartime, when orchestras were a luxury, she toured the UK extensively with the ballet, accompanying them in performances alongside Lambert (and sometimes Harold Rutland) on two pianos, to general acclaim. In final rehearsals for the 1943 production of The Quest, while composer William Walton was still struggling to complete the score, Frederick Ashton had to ask Gaunt to improvise at the appropriate length and tempo, adjusting his choreography to fit once the music finally arrived.

Ashton remembered Gaunt as endearing herself to Constant Lambert by being "a tremendous drinker. She'd always be on tap". Ballerina Annabel Farjeon also remembered her at Sadler's Wells:

Hilda Gaunt sat at the battered upright piano, a cigarette drooping from her mouth as she gossiped in a husky, smokey voice. Often she was the only ﬁlter through which information about a new ballet could be sifted.

Gaunt often played a key role in reconstructing original productions for subsequent revival: for instance, she worked with John Field on the May 1963 revival of Sylvia, which had been out of the repertoire for four years. At the end of her life she collaborated with Leighton Lucas, compiling the score for Kenneth MacMillan's 1974 ballet L'histoire de Manon from the music of Jules Massenet.

She is credited as the accompanist in The Red Shoes (1948), though doesn't appear on screen.
