= Valveless =

English automobile (1908–1915)

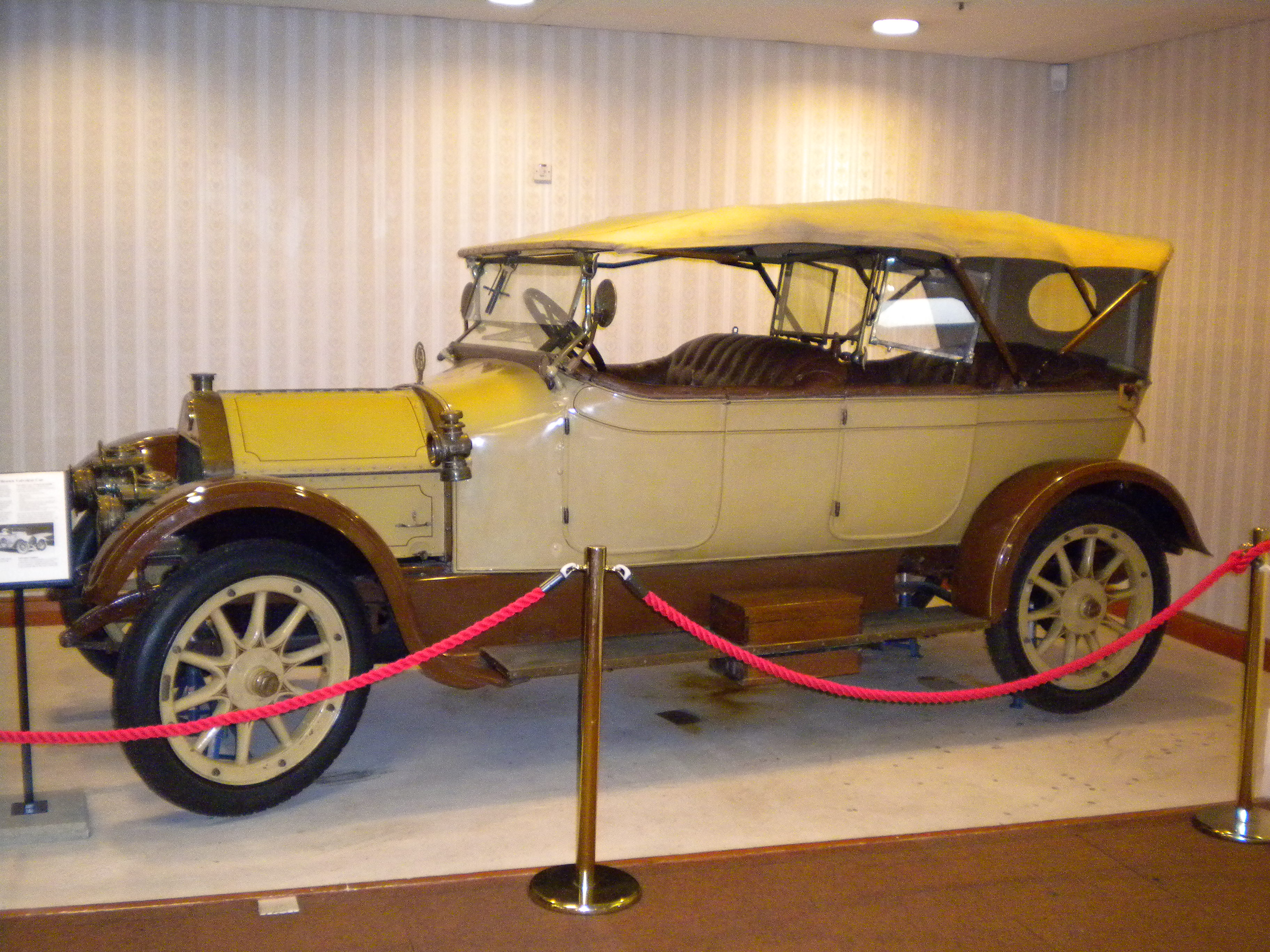
David Brown & Sons' (DBS) 1914 Valveless at Tolson Museum

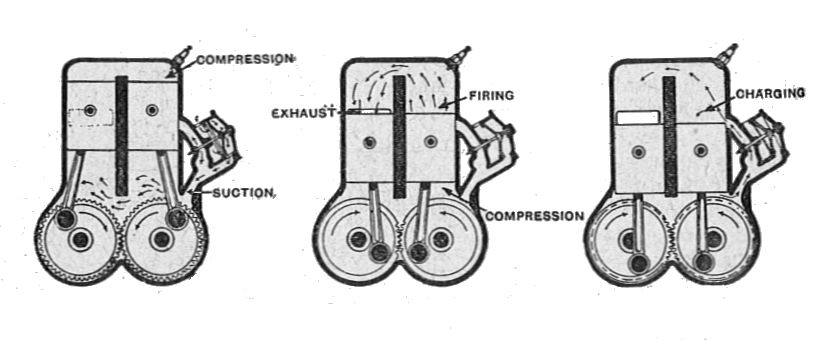
Engine of a "Valveless" car

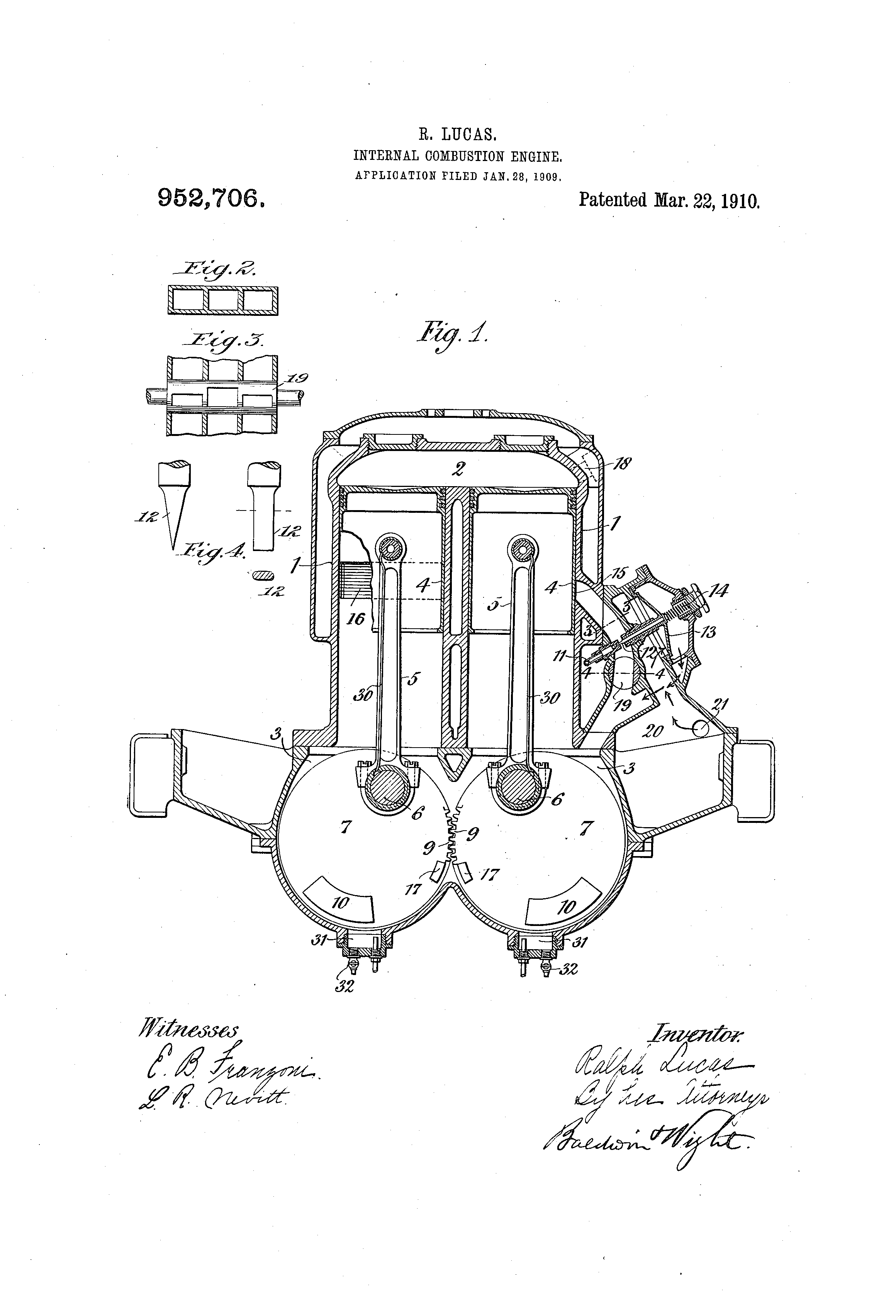
Patent Drawing by Ralph Lucas in US Patent US952706A

The Valveless was an English automobile manufactured, after lengthy development, from 1908 until 1915 in Huddersfield, Yorkshire. The successor to the Ralph Lucas Valveless, the car marked the entry of the David Brown & Sons group into the manufacture of motors. Its engine was a 20 or 25 hp duplex two-stroke model which was advertised as having "only six working parts"; these included two pistons, two connecting rods, and two crankshafts, which were geared together and counter-rotated. This is a type of engine configuration known as a split single since it is effectively a single cylinder split into two.

== Models ==
- 1908

20 hp 2-cylinder 133 × 140 = 3.891 litres

- 1909–1911

25 hp 2-cylinder 133 × 140 = 3.891 litres

- 1911-1915

15 hp 2-cylinder 112 × 127 = 2.503 litres

- 1913

15 hp 2-cylinder 118 × 127 = 2.503 litres

- 1913–1914

19.9 hp 2-cylinder 127 × 127 = 3.217 litres

- 1915

19.9 hp 2-cylinder 127 × 133 = 3.546 litres

The cars with smaller engines had slightly shorter wheelbases and so were lighter.

== See also ==
- List of car manufacturers of the United Kingdom
