= Edward Lucas =

Edward Lucas may refer to:

- Edward Lucas (Australian politician) (1857–1950), South Australian politician
- Edward Lucas (American politician) (1780–1858), United States Congressman from Virginia
- Edward Lucas (cricketer) (1848–1916), Australian cricketer
- Edward Lucas (journalist) (born 1962), British journalist
- Edward Lucas (died 1871), Member of Parliament for Monaghan 1834–1841
- Edward George Handel Lucas (1861–1936), English artist
- Ed Lucas (1939–2021), sportswriter
- Ed Lucas (baseball) (born 1982), American baseball third baseman
- Eddie Lucas (born 1975), basketball player
- E. V. Lucas (1868–1938), British author
- Édouard Lucas (1842–1891), French mathematician
- Ted Lucas (fencer), Welsh fencer
- Ted Lucas (musician) (1939–1992), American musician

== See also ==
- Eduardo Lucas, a fictional character from Arthur Conan Doyle's short story "The Adventure of the Second Stain"
