= Ballet Guild =

English ballet company (1941-1945)

The Ballet Guild was an English ballet company, active from 1941 until 1946. It is closely associated with the dancer-choreographer partnership of Molly Lake (1900–1986) and Travis Kemp (1914–1995).

== Formation and role ==
The Ballet Guild was formed on 10 May 1941 by Deryck Lynham, the barrister Christmas Humphreys (who acted as chairman) and others, and was based in St John's Wood, London. The company was formed to encourage the development of ballet as an art, and to provide opportunities for young dancers and creative artists.

The Guild set up a ballet school, assembled a library of resources, and organised lectures, demonstrations and exhibitions. The company was short-lived, and had disbanded by 1946. At that time there were a dozen or more small ballet groups touring the UK and vying for audiences, including the Arts Theatre Ballet, the London Ballet and the International Ballet.

== Seasons and productions ==
The Guild put on short experimental seasons and toured under ENSA using ad-hoc companies assembled by the dancers and choreographers Molly Lake and her husband Travis Kemp. Lake and Kemp had both previously been in the Pavlova and Markova-Dolin companies, and Lake was an exponent of the Cecchetti method. A quintet, later an orchestra, was formed by Leighton Lucas to provide the music. Most of the London performances took place at the Rudolf Steiner Hall near Baker Street, or the Garrick Theatre in Charing Cross Road.

One of the company's earliest productions was the new ballet Sawdust, with music by Mary Lucas, which was performed in London and Wolverhampton in May 1941 under the direction of Leighton Lucas. Other ballets produced under the Guild included Victorian Bouquet (choreographed by Lake, music by Rossini), Nymphenburg Gardens (Lake, Mozart), and The Last Curtain (Lake, Weber), all three of which were televised just after the war by the Embassy Ballet (later the Continental Ballet), an offshoot of the Ballet Guild.

== Legacy ==
The Guild's library was used as the foundation for the Archives of the Dance, initially established under the chairmanship of Cyril Beaumont in 1946. This later became the dance holdings of the Theatre Museum, London, and is now at the Victoria & Albert Museum.

In 1954, Molly Lake and Travis Kemp took up an appointment to teach and direct the Turkish National Ballet School (which the Turkish Government had asked Ninette de Valois to establish), where they worked for the next two decades.
