= Richard Lucas =

Richard Lucas may refer to:

- Richard Lucas (priest) (1648/9–1715), Welsh Church of England priest and canon
- Richard Cockle Lucas (1800–1883), English sculptor
- Richard Lucas (Australian politician) (1837–1916), member of the Tasmanian House of Assembly
- Richard Lucas (Scottish politician), Scottish politician and founder of the Scottish Family Party
- Richard Lucas (rower) (1886–1968), British rower
- Richard Lucas (psychologist), American psychologist and professor
- Dick N. Lucas (1920–1997), American film animator
- Dick Lucas (minister) (born 1925), British evangelical speaker
- Dick Lucas (American football) (1934–2020), former American football player
- Richie Lucas (born 1938), American footballer
- Dick Lucas (footballer) (born 1948), former association footballer
- Dick Lucas (singer) (born 1961), British vocalist
- Dick Lucas, fictional character from Are You Being Served?
