= Frederick Lucas (Sussex cricketer) =

English cricketer

Frederick Murray Lucas (3 February 1860 – 7 November 1887) was an English cricketer active from 1880 to 1887 who played for Sussex and was club captain in the 1886 season. He was born in Clapham Common and died in Surat. He appeared in 28 first-class matches as a lefthanded batsman who bowled medium pace. He scored 1,291 runs with a highest score of 215 not out and took no wickets.

Lucas was educated at Elstree School, Marlborough College and Trinity College, Cambridge.
