= Morton Lucas =

English cricketer

Morton Peto Lucas (24 November 1856 – 9 July 1921) was an English cricketer active from 1877 to 1890 who played for Sussex. He was born in Clapham Common and died in Westminster. He appeared in 27 first-class matches as a righthanded batsman who bowled right arm fast with a roundarm action. He scored 940 runs with a highest score of 131 and took seven wickets with a best performance of three for 35.
