= Edward Lucas (cricketer) =

Australian cricketer

Personal information
- Born: 16 June 1848; Kingston, Van Diemen's Land
- Died: 19 April 1916 (aged 67); Kingston, Tasmania, Australia

Domestic team information
- Years: Team
- 1877: Tasmania
- Source: Cricinfo, 13 January 2016

Edward Lucas (16 June 1848 – 19 April 1916) was an Australian cricketer. He played one first-class match for Tasmania in 1877.

== See also ==
- List of Tasmanian representative cricketers
