= Benjamin Lucas (soldier) =

17th century English soldier

Benjamin Lucas (fl. 1649–1652) was an English soldier of the seventeenth century who served and settled in Ireland.

Lucas served as a colonel during the Cromwellian conquest of Ireland, and was present at the Siege of Drogheda. He was granted lands around Corofin in County Clare as part of the Cromwellian Settlement of 1652. Sources differ as to his precise relationship to the Irish radical Charles Lucas who served as MP for Dublin City, but the recent consensus appears to be that Charles was his greatnephew.

== Bibliography ==
- Paul Connell, Denis A. Cronin & Brian Ó Dálaigh. Irish Townlands: Studies in Local History. Four Courts, 1998.
