= William John Lucas =

British entomologist

- Born: 1858
- Died: 1932 (aged 73–74)
- Occupation(s): Teacher, entomologist

William John Lucas FRES (1858–1932) was a British entomologist.

Lucas was educated at a grammar school in Oxford and went to the University of London. He became a teacher at Tiffin Boys School in Kingston upon Thames and he was appointed lecturer in nature study to the Surrey County Council.

In 1898 Lucas was elected a fellow of the Entomological Society of London.

He was an authority on British Orthoptera, Odonata and Neuroptera. In his British Dragonflies, published in 1900, he described 39 British species. The book contained coloured plates. "For many years this was the only book available" for students of British dragonflies.

In 1901 Lucas joined the editorial panel of The Entomologist.

He was a member of the council of the Entomological Society from 1904 to 1906, he was president of the South London Entomological Society and vice-president of the Lancashire and Cheshire Entomological Society.

Lucas not only published important works, with plates, painted by himself, "he was also a great teacher, and stimulated younger workers unstintingly."

== Bibliography ==
Among the publications of William John Lucas are:

- Lucas, William John (1900). British Dragonflies (Odonata). London: L. Upcott Gill. OCLC 1064822186 (all editions).
- —— (1917). British Orthoptera. London: for the Ray Society. OCLC 562312261 (all editions).
- —— (1930). The Aquatic (Naiad) Stage of British Dragonflies. London: for the Ray Society. OCLC 1064257857 (all editions).

== Sources ==
- Gambles, Robert Moylan (1976). "A History of Odonatology in the British Isles (Proceedings of the Third International Symposium of Odonatology, Lancaster, July 14–18, 1975, Part I)". Odonatologica. 5 (1): 1–10. (with an image of Lucas at p. 4)
- Harvey, Julie M. V.; Gilbert, Pamela & Martin, Kathy (1996). A Catalogue of Manuscripts in the Entomology Library of the Natural History Museum, London. London: Mansell Publishing Ltd. ISBN 978-0-7201-2290-9.
