= Francis Lucas =

Francis Lucas is the name of:

- Francis Lucas of Bruges (1548/9–1619), Roman Catholic biblical exegete and textual critic from the Habsburg Netherlands.
- Francis Lucas (Royal Navy officer) (c. 1740 – 1770), naval officer and merchant trader born in Clontibret, Ireland
- Francis Lucas (English politician) (1850–1918), British company director and Conservative Member of Parliament for Lowestoft 1900–1906

== See also ==
- Frank Lucas (disambiguation)
