= Ken Lucas =

Ken Lucas may refer to:

- Ken Lucas (American football) (born 1979), American professional football player
- Ken Lucas (politician) (born 1933), American politician
- Ken Lucas (wrestler) (1940–2014), American professional wrestler
- Kenny Lucas (born 1985), American comedian
