= Leighton Lucas =

English composer and conductor

Leighton Lucas (5 January 1903 – 1 November 1982) was an English composer and conductor. His career was wide-ranging: he was associated with the revival of interest in 20th century English ballet, arranged music for dance bands, conducted challenging contemporary classical works and wrote many original concert and film scores.

== Career ==
He was born into a musical family: his father, Clarence Lucas, was also a noted composer from Canada and his English mother Clara Asher-Lucas (1867-1942) was a concert pianist who had studied with Clara Schumann. Lucas began his career as a dancer for Sergei Diaghilev's Ballets Russes (1918–21) but soon branched out into conducting. He joined the Birmingham Repertory Theatre as musical director from 1923 to 1925. During this time he conducted a performance of Rutland Boughton's opera The Immortal Hour in 1923.

In the 1930s he joined the Markova-Dolin ballet company, and in 1941 became musical director of the Ballet Guild, a wartime company for which he formed first a quintet, later an orchestra. He also worked as an arranger for Jack Hylton's orchestra between c.1926 and 1930.

He served in the RAF during the war. Afterwards he formed his own orchestra and developed his conducting career, specializing in French music. In 1954 he conducted the first staged performance in Britain of Honegger's oratorio Jeanne d'Arc au bûcher at the Stoll Theatre. Lucas gave broadcasts and lectures on ballet and theatre music, and was appointed professor at the Royal Academy of Music.

In the 1950s and 1960s Lucas was living at 25 Heathfield Gardens, London W4. In 1974 Lucas (with Hilda Gaunt, pianist for the Royal Ballet) compiled and orchestrated various pieces by Massenet for Kenneth MacMillan's ballet L'histoire de Manon.

== Music ==
Lucas was a self-taught composer of religious works, concert music and film scores. He is particularly noted for his film compositions, including the scores for Target for Tonight (1941), Alfred Hitchcock's Stage Fright (1950), Ice-Cold in Alex (1958) and the incidental music for The Dam Busters, where he fashioned his music around the famous title march by Eric Coates. Philip Lane reconstructed the lost score, noting that Lucas created his own main theme "which seems to play hide and seek with Coates's throughout the film, both vying for supremacy."

His first major concert work to receive recognition was the Partita for piano and chamber orchestra, broadcast in 1934 with the composer conducting the London Symphony Orchestra and his mother Clara Asher-Lucas as the solo pianist. Benjamin Britten described it as "very interesting – especially the quite lovely Sarabande." Lucas's Sinfonia Brevis (1936) for horn and 11 instruments may be one of the earliest British scores to incorporate Balinese gamelan effects. It was also heard by Britten, who went on to use such effects in his music from Paul Bunyan.

Ballet de la Reine (1949, revised 1957) is a six movement suite taken from the sketches of an unperformed ballet, Pavan for Mary, which was originally intended for the Edinburgh Ballet Club. The music looks back to Elizabethan music forms (similarly to Peter Warlock's Capriol Suite) while also retaining a French flavour (because Mary, Queen of Scots spent her childhood in France).

== Selected compositions ==
Orchestral

- 1934 – Partita (1934) for piano and chamber orchestra
- 1936 – Sinfonia Brevis for horn and 11 instruments
- 1945 – We of the West Riding
- 1939 – Sonatina concertante for saxophone and orchestra
- 1940 – Suite française
- 1941 – March-Prelude (from Target for Tonight)
- 1942 – A Litany for orchestra
- 1947 – Introductory Theme for Just William radio series
- 1949 – Ballet de la Reine for strings (revised 1957)
- 1950 – Dedication (from Portrait of Clare (film)|Portrait of Clare)
- 1950 – Eve's Rhapsody (from Stage Fright)
- 1953 – This Is York (music from the documentary film)
- 1954 – Prelude and Dam Blast (from The Dam Busters)
- 1956 – Cello Concertino for cello and orchestra
- 1956 – Concert Champetre for violin and orchestra
- 1956 – Prelude, Aria and Finale for viola d'amore and orchestra
- 1957 – Clarinet Concerto
- 1957 – Portrait of the Amethyst (from Yangtse Incident)
- 1958 – Suite from Ice Cold in Alex
- 1970 – Birthday Variations

Ballet

- 1935 – The Wolf’s Ride
- 1936 – Death in Adagio (after Domenico Scarlatti)
- 1945-6 – The Horses
- 1972-3 – Tam O’Shanter

Brass Band

- 1960 – Symphonic Suite
- 1962 – Spring Song
- 1968 – Chorale and Variations
- 1973 – A Waltz Overture

Choral

- 1928 – Masque of the Sea for chorus and orchestra. Dedicated "To Mrs. Ernest Toye with All Affection"
- 1934 – Massa pro defunctis
- 1953 – My True Love hath my Heart, madrigal for women's voices
- 1953 – Sleep and Death, partsong SATB
- 1964 - Te Deum laudamus for soprano and baritone solo, chorus and organ
- 1967 – Mass in G minor
- 1969 – Parish Mass

Chamber

- 1956 – Meditation for cello and piano
- 1959 – Aubade for horn, bassoon and piano
- 1960 – Soliloquy for viola and piano
- 1961 – Tristesse for viola and piano
- 1966 – Disquisition for two cellos and piano duet

== Selected filmography ==
- Princess Charming (1934)
- The Cardinal (1936)
- Head over Heels (1937)
- Target for Tonight (1941)
- Now Barabbas (1949)
- Portrait of Clare (1950)
- Stage Fright (1950)
- The Weak and the Wicked (1954)
- The Dam Busters (1955)
- Yangtse Incident: The Story of H.M.S. Amethyst (1957)
- Ice Cold in Alex (1958)
- The Son of Robin Hood (1958)
- Serious Charge (1959)
