= James Lucas (hermit) =

British hermit (1813–1874)

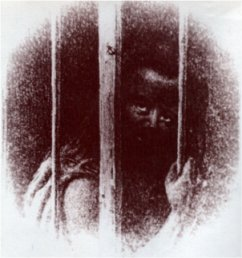
James Lucas, the Hermit of Hertfordshire

James Lucas (1813 – 21 April 1874) was a celebrated English Victorian eccentric and hermit who gained international renown by his strange way of life. He was known as the Hermit of Hertfordshire and Mad Lucas. Lucas lived with his mother's dead body for 3 months before it was taken away by the clergyman.

James Lucas continued to live in that house for 25 years until his death. He was visited by Charles Darwin in 1842. They were introduced by a mutual friend and Charles Dickens even interviewed Lucas about his lifestyle.

Lucas was very intelligent according to Dickens. He often offered candy to children who visited his house and was described as a very kind and academic man. People believed his mother's death sent him spiralling and caused damage to his mental health.

== Life ==
He loved to administer his mother's will, in which he inherited the family estate at Elmwood House near Redcoats Green, Hertfordshire, and deferred the burial of her mother for three months. He developed a paranoid fear of his relatives. He locked himself in his mansion and allowed nothing in the building to be touched. It sank into a dilapidated and decaying condition.

He lived solely in the kitchen, sleeping on a bed of ashes and soot. He went naked except for a blanket, enveloped in which he used to appear at his windows. He never washed and his hair grew to waist length. He lived on bread, cheese, eggs, kippers and gin. His house became infested with rats and he kept his food in baskets hung from the ceiling to protect it from them. He always kept a gun at his side.

Lucas communicated with the world only through an iron grille and later in life employed two armed watchmen who lived in a nearby hut. He was, however, quite willing to receive visitors, mostly tramps and children but increasingly the well-to-do who came to engage him in conversation.

== Slave ownership ==
According to the Legacies of British Slave-Ownership at the University College London, Lucas was awarded a payment as a slave trader in the aftermath of the Slavery Abolition Act 1833 with the Slave Compensation Act 1837. Lucas was associated with three different related to British Guiana and Saint Vincent and the Grenadine. Two of the claims were sucesfull.

== Death and legacy ==
Lucas died of apoplexy in 1874, having hoarded a considerable sum of money in his living room. He is buried in the family grave in Hackney churchyard, London.

After his death 17 cartloads of dirt and ashes were removed from the house.

Lucas is the subject of the song Mad Lucas by The Breeders on their 1993 album, Last Splash.
