= Charles Lucas (politician) =

Irish apothecary, physician and politician (1713–1771)

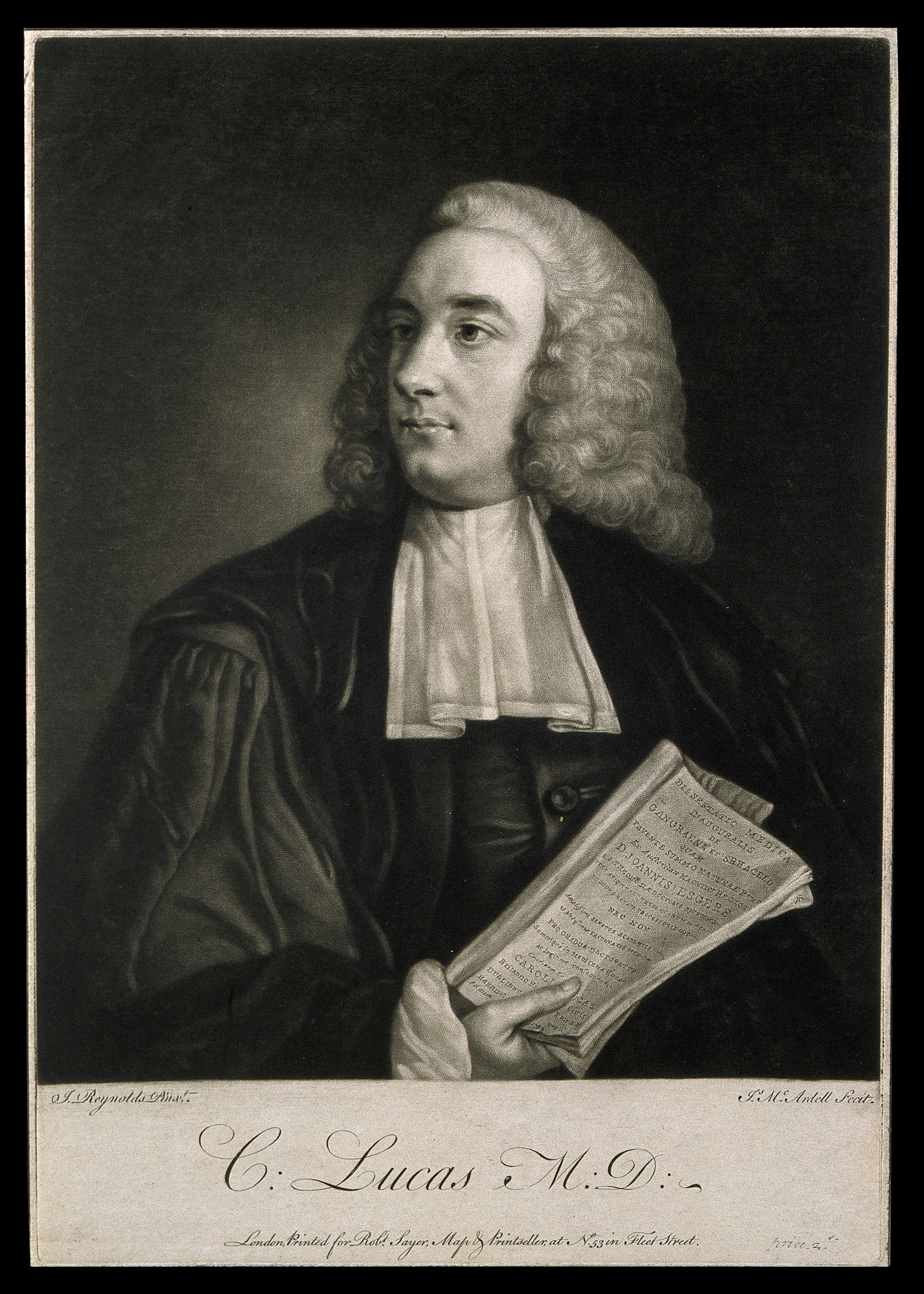
- Born: 16 September 1713; Dublin, Ireland
- Died: 4 November 1771 (aged 58); St Michans, Dublin, Ireland
- Resting place: St. Michan's Church and Cemetery, Dublin, Ireland
- Occupations: Politician and physician
- Known for: Political radicalism

Charles Lucas (16 September 1713 – 4 November 1771) was an Anglo-Irish apothecary, physician and politician. He sat as Member of Parliament for Dublin City and was known as the "Irish Wilkes" because of his radical views.

== Early life ==
The Lucas family were established in Ireland when Colonel Benjamin Lucas, Charles' great-uncle, was granted lands in County Clare following the Cromwellian conquest of Ireland in the early 1650s. Charles Lucas was the younger son of Benjamin Lucas of Ballingaddy, County Clare. Benjamin Lucas died about 1727, leaving £937 to his family, of which Charles was to receive £80. Having served the usual apprenticeship as an apothecary, Lucas was admitted to the Guild of St. Mary Magdalene.

== Apothecary ==
For many years Lucas kept a shop in Charles Street, Dublin. He married his first wife, Anne Blundell, in 1734. In conducting his business Lucas was struck with certain abuses connected with the sale of drugs, and in 1735 published A Short Scheme for Preventing Frauds and Abuses in Pharmacy, humbly offered to the Consideration of the Legislature. His pamphlet was resented by his fellow apothecaries, but was the cause of an act being passed for the inspection of medicines.

In 1741, he published his Pharmacomastix, or the Office, Use, and Abuse of Apothecaries Explained, and had the satisfaction of seeing the former act renewed.

== Political career ==
In this year Lucas was chosen as one of the representatives of his corporation on the Common Council of the City of Dublin. He soon came to the conclusion that the board of Aldermen had illegally usurped many of the powers belonging of right to the entire corporation.

Aided by James La Touche, a prominent merchant of the city, he secured the appointment of a committee, with Latouche as chairman, to inspect the charters and records of the city. The Aldermen strenuously resisted reform, and in 1743 he published A Remonstrance against certain Infringements on the Rights and Liberties of the Commons and Citizens of Dublin, arguing that the right of electing Aldermen lay with the entire corporation.

His argument was disputed by Recorder Stannard, and in the following year Lucas published his closely reasoned and temperate Divelina Libera: an Apology for the Civil Rights and Liberties of the Commons and Citizens of Dublin. During the year the controversy continued with unabated zeal on both sides (see The Proceedings of the Sheriffs and Commons, &c., Dublin, 1744, and A Message from the Sheriffs and Commons to the Lord Mayor and Aldermen... protesting against the Election of George Ribton, Dublin, 26 Sept. 1744). By Lucas's efforts a fund was raised by voluntary subscription, and a suit commenced on 7 November 1744 against the Aldermen in the court of king's bench. But after a hearing of two days, permission was refused by the judge to lodge information, and the victorious Aldermen struck out the names of Lucas and his supporters from the following triennial return of the Common Council.

On 25 December 1747 Lucas presented a printed statement of the case, entitled The Complaints of Dublin, to the Lord-Lieutenant of Ireland, the Earl of Harrington, but Harrington declined to move in the business.

When in August 1748 a vacancy occurred in the parliamentary representation of the city of Dublin, Lucas offered himself as a candidate. Alderman Sir Samuel Cooke and James La Touche also came forward, and although the views of Lucas and Latouche were practically identical, neither would withdraw. To advance his candidature, Lucas in 1748–49 published twenty political addresses to his fellow citizens, explaining his views on the constitution, reflecting severely on the corruption prevailing in the House of Commons, and advocating the principles expounded by William Molyneux in favour of parliamentary independence. He rejected the claim that Ireland was a conquered colony dependent on the government and parliament of Great Britain. He continued "...it must now be confessed that there was no general rebellion in Ireland, since the first British invasion, that was not raised or fomented by the oppression, instigation, evil influence or connivance of the English." These addresses and a certain paper called The Censor, or Citizen's Journal, offended not only the court party, but also the friends of La Touche, whose character was roughly handled by Lucas, especially in his fourteenth address. In counter addresses and pamphlets Lucas was stigmatised as a needy adventurer, a man of no family, and a political firebrand.

While the election was still pending, the death of Alderman Nathaniel Pearson in May 1749 caused a second vacancy in the representation, and Lucas and La Touche became partly reconciled in opposing Cooke and the second aldermanic candidate, Charles Burton. Shortly afterwards, the corporation having resolved to farm the revenues of the city to a certain Alderman, Lucas denounced the affair as a job, and the council in which the resolution had been passed as packed. The corporation voted the charge false and malicious, and refused to hear Lucas in his defence. The censure was confirmed at a subsequent meeting, and a vote of thanks passed to the author of a pamphlet entitled Lucas Detected, conjectured to have been Edmund Burke, at that time a student at Trinity College. But an appeal by Lucas to the corporation secured fifteen votes out of the twenty-five in his favour.

About the same time he printed, with a translation and notes, The Great Charter of the City of Dublin. The lords justices refused (15 May 1749) his request to transmit it to the king, with a "Dedication to his Majesty." But on the return of Lord Harrington, Lucas waited on him at the castle on 8 October, and gave him a copy, together with a collection of his political addresses. Lucas was favourably impressed with his reception. Two days later (5 October), however, he attended a levee, and was peremptorily required to leave the castle. The next day he published the story in a newspaper, "with thanks to his excellency for the honour he did him," and on the day following, 7 October, issued An Address to his Excellency... with a Preface to the Free and Independent Citizens of Dublin, commenting on his treatment.

The date of the parliamentary election was approaching, and the government resolved to prevent Lucas from proceeding to the poll. When Parliament assembled on 10 October, the lord-lieutenant in his speech from the throne animadverted on certain bold attempts to create jealousies between the two kingdoms. The reference to Lucas was unmistakable, and the commons, on a motion of Sir Richard Cox, 2nd Baronet, ordered Lucas and his printer to appear at the bar of the house. Esdall, Lucas's publisher, absconded; but the copy of his publications presented to the lord-lieutenant was put in evidence against him. The feeling of the house ran strongly against him, although the people of Dublin were hotly in his favour. Being ordered to withdraw, a series of resolutions was passed declaring him to be an enemy to his country, calling upon the attorney-general to prosecute him for his offence, and ordering his immediate imprisonment in Newgate. Esdall's wife, Anne, was called in her husband's absence to be questioned by the Irish house of commons about Lucas' writings.

== Physician ==
His first intention was to submit quietly to his punishment; but finding that he was to be treated with scant decency, he escaped to the Isle of Man, and thence to London. After his flight he was presented by the grand juries of the county and city of Dublin as a common libeller, following a ferocious charge demanding his indictment by Thomas Marlay, the Lord Chief Justice of Ireland.

A proclamation was issued by the lord-lieutenant, at the request of the House of Commons, for his apprehension, and an engraver who advertised a mezzotint of him, as "an exile for his country, who seeking for liberty lost it", was committed to prison by order of the House of Commons. Finally, at the Christmas assembly of the Dublin Corporation, he was disfranchised. Meanwhile, Cooke and Latouche had been elected to represent Dublin in parliament.

After a short residence in London, Lucas proceeded to the continent for the purpose of studying medicine. At Paris he studied under Petit, and after visiting Rheims proceeded to Leyden, where he graduated M.D. on 20 December 1752.

The title of his thesis was De Gangrena et Sphacelo, written in Latin. Не then visited Spa, Aachen, and other baths for the purpose of investigating the composition of their mineral waters. He returned to England in 1753, proceeding to Bath, and after a series of elaborate experiments conducted in public he went to London, where he established himself in practice. In 1756 he published An Essay on Waters. In three Parts: (i) of Simple Waters, (ii) of Cold Medicated Waters, (iii) of Natural Baths. This treatise, reviewed by Dr. Johnson, gave great offence to the faculty at Bath, and having occasion to visit that place in 1757 he became involved in an acrimonious controversy with the heads of the profession there owing to their refusal to consult with him.

But the book garnered him considerable reputation, and enabled him, it is improbably said, to make an annual income of £3,000 by his profession. On 25 June 1759, he was admitted a licentiate of the College of Physicians of London, and he established a successful practice in London.

Lucas was one of 49 physicians and chirurgeons who declared their public support for the construction of a Publick Bath in Dublin in May 1771 and named Achmet Borumborad as a well qualified individual for carrying such a scheme into existence.

== Return to Ireland ==
In view of the general election at the accession of George III, Lucas published in November 1760 a pamphlet entitled Seasonable Advice to the Electors... of Ireland in general, to those of Dublin in particular. In the same month, he determined to offer himself as a candidate for the city of Dublin, notwithstanding the consequent loss of his practice in London. After assuring himself that the electors of Dublin "were warmed with the same sentiments in which he left them," he obtained a personal interview with the king in order to petition for pardon, and being favourably received was enabled to return to Dublin, 15 March 1761, on a nolle prosequi. His return was the occasion of great popular rejoicing; the order for his disfranchisement was annulled at the midsummer assembly of the corporation; and in July the degree of Doctor of Physic was conferred upon him by Trinity College, Dublin. During the election, Lucas's colleague, Colonel Dunn, withdrew his candidature in order to insure Lucas's return, which was strongly opposed by the aldermanic party. After a thirteen days' poll he and Recorder Grattan, father of Henry Grattan, were elected, and he continued to represent Dublin City till his death in 1771.

In parliament Lucas does not appear to have shone as an orator; but by assiduously bringing every question of importance before the public, he had the merit of reviving "that constitutional connection which ought to subsist between the constituents and their representative." On the first day of the session, 22 October 1761, he obtained leave to bring in the heads of a bill for shortening the duration of parliaments, which he presented to the house on 28 October; but on a motion to have it transmitted to England, it was defeated by a majority of sixty-five. Shortly afterwards he presented the heads of two new bills for securing the freedom of parliament. In 1763 the Freeman's Journal, a biweekly newspaper, was started by three Dublin merchants under the management of Henry Brooke (1703?–1783). Lucas contributed to it from its commencement, sometimes anonymously, but generally under the signature of "A Citizen" or "Civis." Small as were its literary merits, the paper enjoyed at first great popularity, owing to the gratuitous contributions of Lucas and its strenuous assertion of Irish Protestant privileges.

In 1766 Lucas unsuccessfully opposed a bill to prevent the exportation of grain, on the ground that certain alterations made in it by the English privy council were detrimental to the rights of the Irish parliament. He justified his conduct in An Address to the Lord Mayor and Citizens of Dublin, and replied to further censure in A Second Address to the Lord Mayor. Several guilds, and among them the Guild of Merchants, presented addresses of thanks to him, and it was even proposed to grant him a salary of £365 a year out of the city treasury as a public acknowledgement of his services in parliament. The proposal was rejected by the Aldermen, and its rejection led to a renewal of the old quarrel between them and the commons, and to fresh manifestations of public sympathy with Lucas.

In 1768 Lucas strongly opposed the scheme for the augmentation of the army, on the ground partly that he favoured the establishment of a national militia, but chiefly because in his opinion, "Standing parliaments and standing armies have ever proved the most dangerous enemies to civil liberty." In this year he caused a considerable sensation by trying to institute a parliamentary inquiry into the case of a soldier whom he regarded as the victim of military discipline. His efforts in parliament proving unsuccessful, he published a pamphlet entitled A Mirror for Courts-Martial: in which the Complaints, Trial, Sentence, and Punishment of David Blakeney are examined. It is probably to his conduct on this occasion that Lord Townshend referred in a letter to the Marquess of Granby, "Here is a Doctor Lucas, the Wilkes of Ireland, who has been playing the devil here and poisoning all the soldiery with his harangues and writings; but I have treated this nonsensical demagogue as he deserves, with his mob at his heels." Lord Townshend's protest against the right of the Irish House of Commons to originate money bills, and his sudden prorogation of parliament in December 1769 drew from Lucas early in 1770 a pamphlet entitled The Rights and Privileges of Parliament asserted upon constitutional Principles. It was announced in the newspapers that an answer, "published by authority," entitled The Usage of holding Parliaments and of preparing Bills of Supply in Ireland, stated from Record, would shortly appear. The book appeared on the day announced, but was instantly suppressed. A copy, however, came into Lucas's possession, and finding that it told more against than for the government he immediately republished it, with a sarcastic introduction and commentary.

From his earliest years, Lucas had been a martyr to hereditary gout, which rendered him a complete cripple, and latterly obliged him to be carried to the House of Commons. Nevertheless, says an eye-witness, "the gravity and uncommon neatness of his dress, his grey, venerable locks, blending with a pale but interesting countenance, in which an air of beauty was still visible, altogether excited attention, and I never saw a stranger come into the house without asking who he was." He died at his residence in Henry Street, Dublin, on Monday 4 November 1771. His remains were honoured with a public funeral of imposing solemnity. He was interred in the family burial ground in St. Michan's churchyard. Lucas’s son Henry and other relatives were in attendance at his funeral, as were his friends Lord Charlemont, Flood, Thomas Adderley and Sir Lucius O'Brien, 3rd Baronet. The mourners also included officers and many hundred brethren of the guilds and the Lord Mayor with representatives of the Corporation and the Vice-Provost and scholars of Trinity College.

== Notes ==
- Note: citations prefixed with "via DNB" were copied from the DNB article and have not been independently verified.

== Bibliography ==
- http://www.dublincity.ie/RecreationandCulture/MuseumsGalleriesandTheatres/CityHall/Documents/DCCH03[1].pdf

Parliament of Ireland
Preceded by Sir Charles Burton, 1st Bt; James Dunn	Member of Parliament for Dublin City; 1761–1771; With: James Grattan 1761–176; William FitzGerald, Marquess of Kildare 1767–1771	Succeeded by William FitzGerald, Marquess of Kildare; William Clement
