= Richard Lucas (priest) =

Richard Lucas (1648/1649 – 29 June 1715) was a Welsh clergyman and writer of devotional works.

== Life ==
Lucas was born at Presteigne, Radnorshire. He was educated at Jesus College, Oxford, matriculating there on 3 March 1665 at the age of 16. He obtained his B.A. in 1668 and his M.A. in 1672. He was appointed a Fellow of the college in 1671, holding this position until 1684. He was, for a time, master of the school at Abergavenny, Monmouthshire.

After his ordination, his first major publication was Practical Christianity (1677), containing prayers and discussion on Christian living. This was a popular work and, coupled with his ability as a preacher, seems to have helped him to be appointed as rector of St. Stephen Coleman Street in 1678. He became lecturer of St Olave, Southwark, in 1683. Whilst his weak eyesight soon failed completely, he nonetheless wrote Enquiry after Happiness (1685), his most famous work. Other publications included The Duty of Servants (1685). In 1697, he was appointed to a prebend at Westminster Abbey and, in 1701, became president of Sion College. He died at Westminster on 29 June 1715 and was buried in the abbey.
