= Charles Lucas (architect) =

French architect and writer

- Born: Charles Louis-Achille Lucas; 8 April 1838; Paris
- Died: 30 September 1905 (aged 67); Paris
- Occupation: Architect

Charles Lucas (8 April 1838 – 30 September 1905) was a 19th-century French architect and writer.

== Biography ==
The son of architect Achille Lucas (1811–1889), Charles Lucas joined the école des beaux-arts de Paris in 1856 and studied with Simon-Claude Constant-Dufeux then later at the école pratique des hautes études. He created the lessons of art history at the école Boulle and also designed the plans for the école Estienne.

Charles Lucas was a member of numerous learned societies including a corresponding member of the Société des Antiquaires de France

== Some publications ==
- 1867: L'Espagne à l'Exposition universelle de 1867, aperçu des nombreux et intéressants envois de la Direction générale des travaux publics de Madrid
- 1868: Biographie universelle des architectes célèbres
- 1877: Le joyeulx dict de la commission du Manuel des lois du bâtiment...
- 1881: Étude sur quelques monuments portugais, d'après des notes de M. le Cr da Silva
- 1903: Achille Hermant, sa vie et ses œuvres, 1823 - Paris - 1903
