= Charles Lucas (cricketer, born 1885) =

English cricketer

Charles Eric Lucas (16 April 1885 – 4 April 1967) was an English cricketer who played first-class cricket for Sussex and Cambridge University between 1906 and 1908. He was a right-handed middle-order batsman and a right-arm slow bowler. He was born at Westminster, London and died at Warnham, Sussex.
