= Charles Lucas (cricketer, born 1853) =

English cricketer

Charles James Lucas (25 February 1853 – 17 April 1928) was an English cricketer active from 1876 to 1882 who played for Middlesex and Sussex. He was born in Clapham Common and died in Pimlico. He appeared in twelve first-class matches as a righthanded batsman who bowled roundarm right arm fast. He scored 237 runs with a highest score of 38 and took seven wickets with a best performance of three for 17.
