= David Brown Ltd. =

British engineering company

David Brown Santasalo
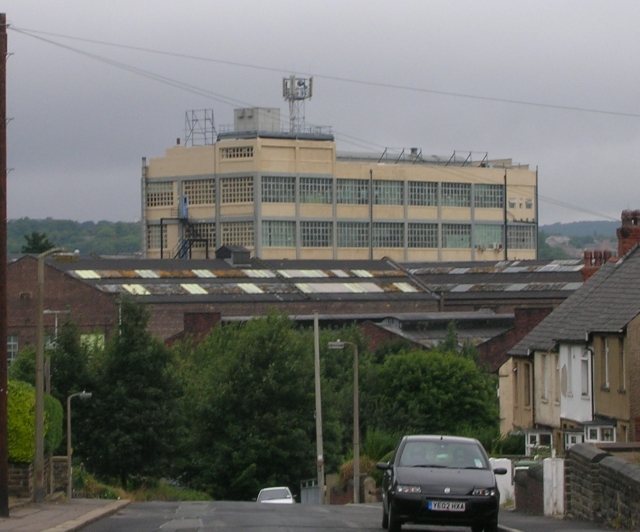
- David Brown Gears; Park Works, Huddersfield, 2005
- Formerly: David Brown Engineering
- Founded: 1880
- Founder: David Brown
- Subsidiaries: Vosper Thorneycroft
- Website: www.dbsantasalo.com

David Brown Santasalo, formerly David Brown Engineering, is a British engineering company, principally engaged in the manufacture of gears and gearboxes. Their major gear manufacturing plant is in Swan Lane, Lockwood, Huddersfield, adjacent to Lockwood railway station. It is named after the company's founder, David Brown, though it is more closely associated with his grandson, Sir David Brown (1904–1993).

== History ==
=== David Brown ===
Founded in 1860 as a pattern manufacturing company, by 1873 David Brown had begun to concentrate on gear systems and by 1898 was specialising in machine-cut gears.

The company moved in 1902 to Park Works, Huddersfield, where the firm is based today.

=== David Brown & Sons, Huddersfield (the Huddersfield group) ===
When David Brown died in 1901, his sons Percy and Frank took over and began the manufacture of gears, complete gear units, gear cutting machines, tools and equipment, bearings and shafts and worm drive gears. The foundry made steel and non-ferrous castings.

From 1908 to 1915, David Brown and Sons designed, developed and made the Valveless car under engineer Frederick Tasker Burgess (1879–1929), later chief engineer at Humber, and later still one of the team that developed the first 3-litre Bentley engine.

In 1913, they established a joint venture in America with Timken for Radicon worm drive units. By the end of World War I the workforce had increased from 200 to 1,000 as they started building propulsion units for warships, and drive mechanisms for armaments. By 1921 the company was the largest worm gear manufacturer in the world.

In 1930 the company took over P R Jackson another local firm of gear manufacturers and steel founders. Frank's eldest son, Sir David Brown, became managing director in 1931 following Percy's death in June that year. W S Roe was appointed joint managing director with David but he died in April 1933. Percy was appointed chairman. The business formed another overseas joint venture with Richardson Gears of Footscray, Victoria, Australia, in 1934. In 1934 the company moved into an old Silk Mill on a site at Meltham, on the south side of Huddersfield. Brown started building tractors with Harry Ferguson there in 1936.

The company obtained a patent for a tank transmission using controlled differential steering system, known as the Merritt-Brown system, devised by Henry Merritt, Director of Tank Design at Woolwich Arsenal, in 1935. The first vehicle to use this system was the Churchill tank, and it was subsequently used on the Centurion tank and the Conqueror tank, as well as the Tortoise heavy tank.

In 1951 the Huddersfield and Tractor groups freehold land and buildings at Huddersfield, Penistone and Meltham were on sites covering about 150 acres (61 ha). Another 260,000 sq ft of floor space were held under lease.

Gearing manufactured by David Brown and powered by electric motors manufactured by Brook Crompton, whose factory was in Brockholes, are used to rotate the top of the BT Tower in London.

=== David Brown Tractors Group ===
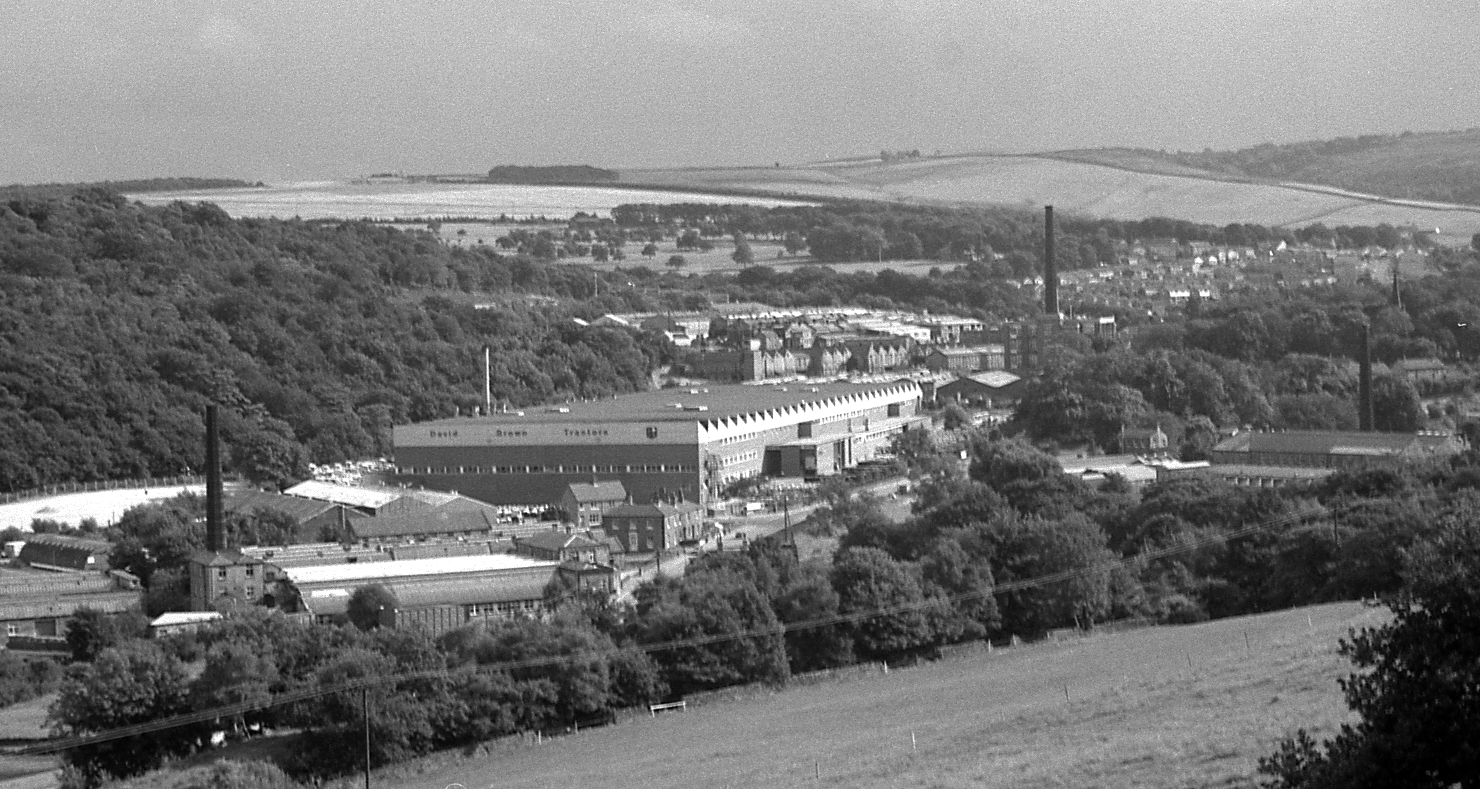
David Brown Tractor Factory Meltham Mills 1981

Personally controlled since its inception by David Brown (1904–1993) the first venture into tractor production was in a joint project with Harry Ferguson in 1936 building the Ferguson-Brown tractor. David Brown became one of the biggest British tractor manufactures in the post war period, with a major manufacturing plant at Meltham, in the West Riding of Yorkshire. The Ferguson-Brown had many innovative features, including the use of cast alloy for many the components, which was light but prone to damage. The Ferguson-Brown used a Coventry Climax engine for the first 350 tractors. Browns developed their own engine which was fitted to subsequent production. Total production was 1350 + 1 built from parts in 1940 after production finished.

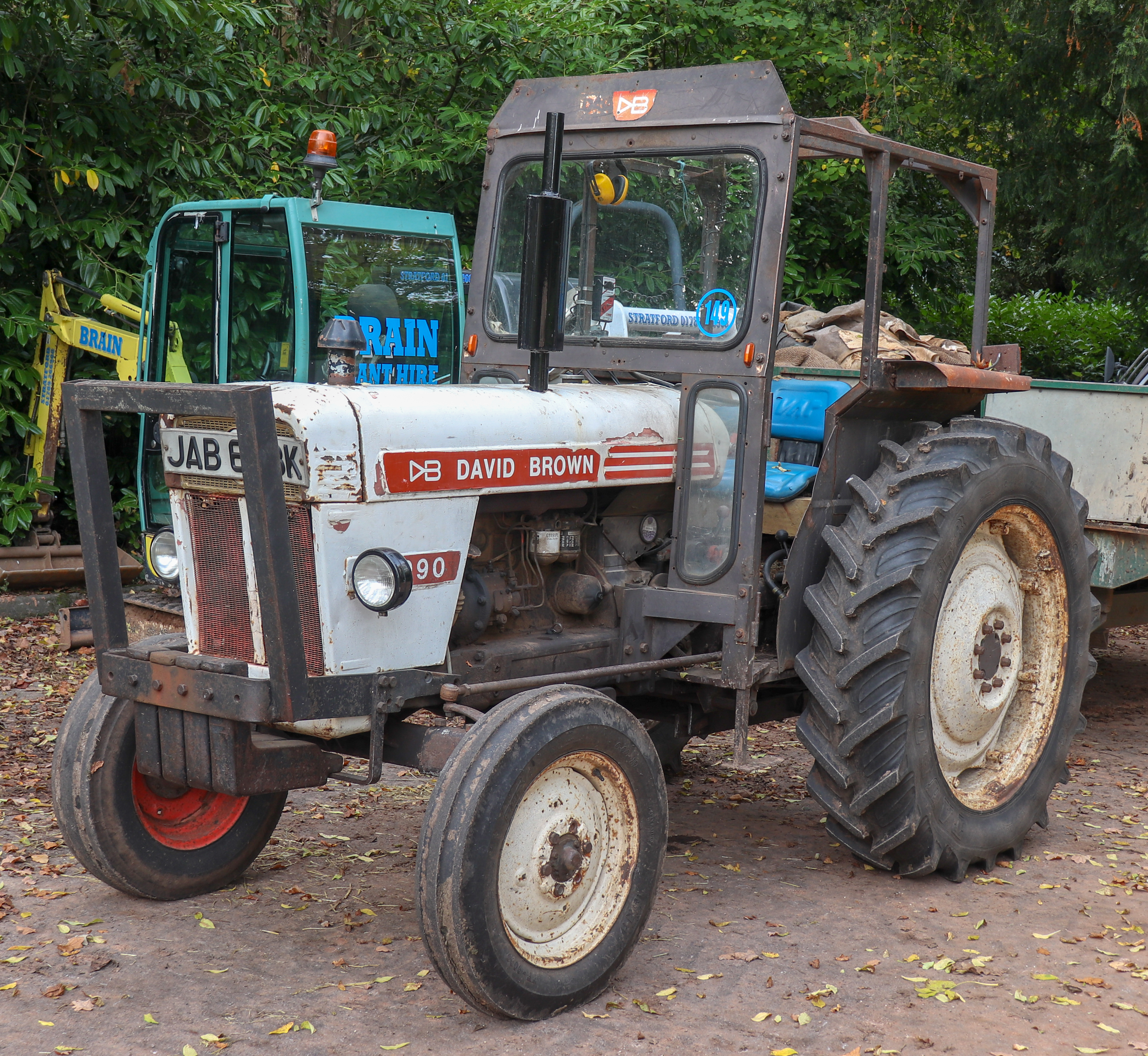
1971 David Brown 990 tractor

Brown and Ferguson disagreed over tractor design details in the late 30s, which led David Brown to design his own version, the VAK1, in secret. This was launched at the 1939 Royal Show. Ferguson split away from Brown and joined up with Henry Ford in 1938, after a 'handshake' agreement, to allow his Ferguson System three-point linkage to be used on the Fordson N tractors. That agreement was eventually terminated by Ford's grandson in 1947 and Ferguson again split away to form Ferguson Tractors in 1948.

During World War II Brown's new heavier tractor, the VAK1, was produced, with over 7,700 units eventually sold, making Brown a wealthy man. It is said the David Brown Tractor is the only one to be built onto a sturdy cast iron chassis where other makers bolt components together to form a chassis-less construction which is weaker. Brown also built aircraft tugs (VIG) for the Royal Air Force and for pulling the bomb trolleys used to re-arm aircraft. These tugs are distinctive, with truck like tyres, wrap round body work and HD bumpers front and rear, some being fitted with winches. In 1942 Brown started building a tracklayer version, the DB4. The DB4 was built for the army engineers and solved some of the problems found with the VTK, and got round an embargo on imported machines for military use. It was powered by a 38 h.p. Dorman diesel and a five-speed gearbox. The DB4 was replaced in 1950 by the Trackmaster 30.

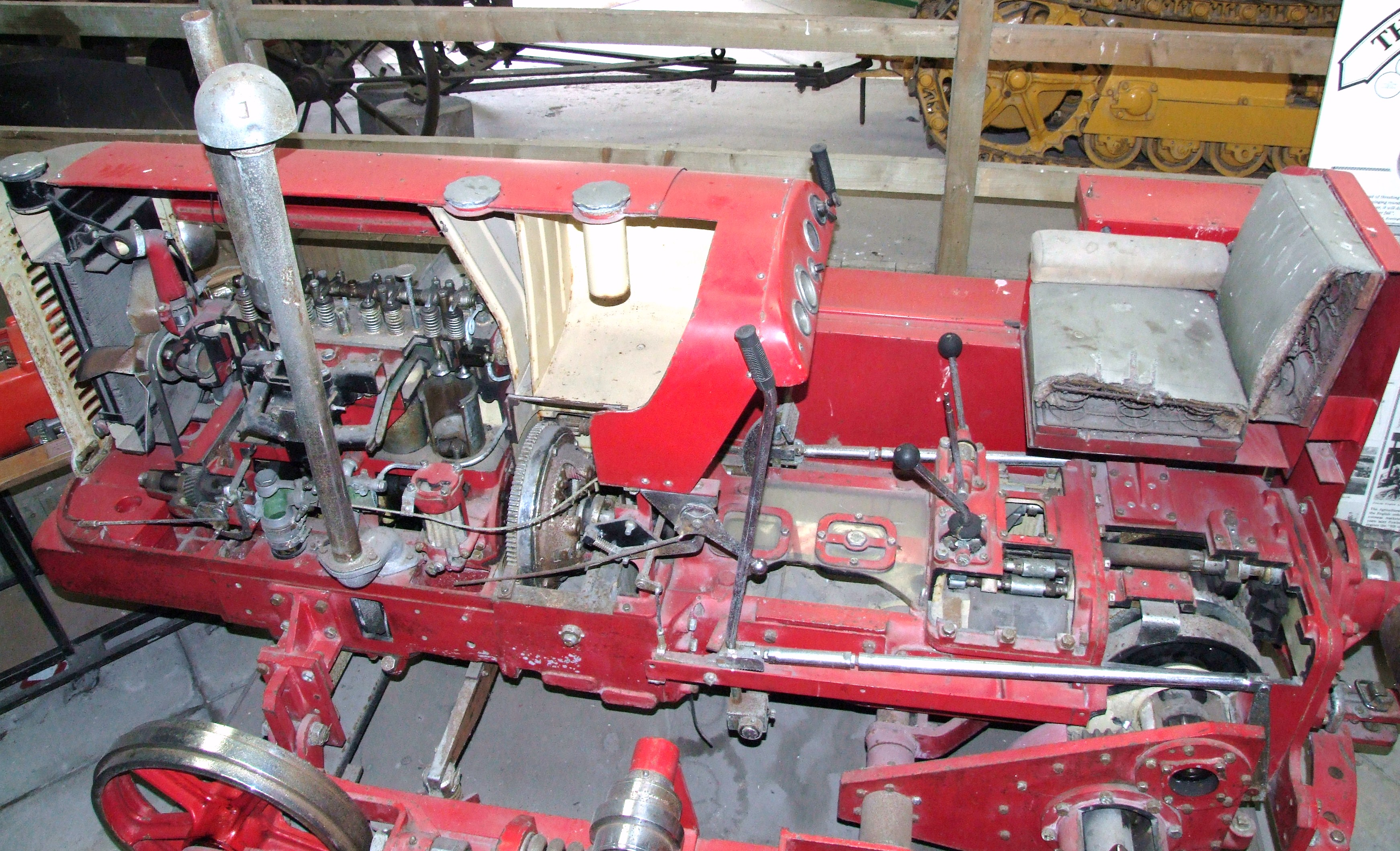
Side view of a cut away display of a 1953 30T Trackmaster

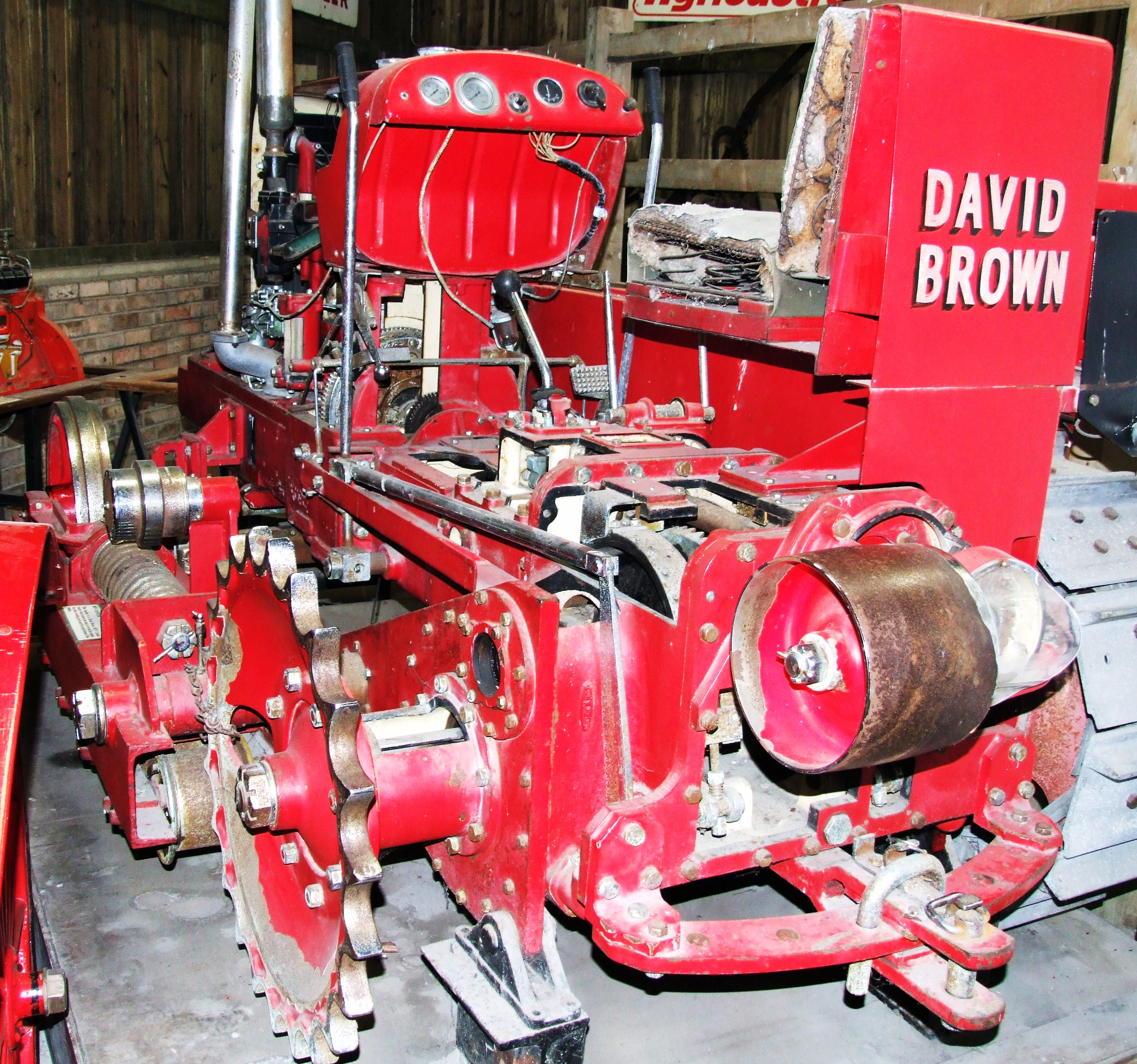
Rear view of a cut away display of a 1953 30T Trackmaster

The tractors division took over the Lancashire firm of Harrison, McGregor & Guest, who produced the Albion brand of agricultural machinery to complement the tractor product line. After the takeover the company's badge was modified to incorporate the white rose of Yorkshire and the red rose of Lancashire. The Tractors division had ten subsidiaries around the world. At one stage 80% of production was exported. Sales were handled by 2,508 agents in 100 countries. A worldwide recession saw tractor sales slump, and after braving the storm and with the debt of a brand new building and production line to finance, it was inevitable that the company was put up for sale, bought by Tenneco who also owned the US tractor firm J.I. Case Company. All hope to see the factory prosper was dashed when it was announced that survival was a competition between Huddersfield and the International Harvester tractor plant in Doncaster, with the odds stacked in the latter's favour, especially with access to the motorway network on the doorstep. The Meltham factory ended production and a respected British name was erased.

==== Tractor Group's Lagonda and Aston Martin ====
In 1947, Brown saw a classified advertisement in The Times, offering for sale a High Class Motor Business. Brown acquired Aston Martin for £20,500 and, in the following year, Lagonda for £52,500, followed by the coachbuilder Tickford in 1955. He subsequently concentrated all the Aston Martin manufacturing at the Tickford premises in Newport Pagnell. The David Brown years saw production of the legendary DB series of Aston Martins, which were featured in some James Bond films.

David Brown also had connections with Vosper shipbuilding, and Delapina and Radyne machinery.

Both car companies were sold in 1972 to Company Developments, when Aston Martin was in financial trouble, for a nominal £100.

=== Sale of David Brown Tractors to Case 1972 ===
In 1972 the tractor operations were sold to Tenneco of America, who owned the JI Case tractor company. The sale was due to a combination of a reduction in the UK tractor market, increased product development costs, the need to meet new regulations on health and safety, and increased competition from imported machinery. Case applied the David Brown name and branding to some of its own tractor models in the UK market until the early 1980s before abandoning it in favour of the Case IH brand.

=== Sale by David Brown family – management buyout 1990 ===
In 1990 the David Brown family disposed of its stake to the business's management. It then floated David Brown as a public company in 1993. David Brown was acquired by Textron in October 1998.

This business, trading as David Brown Engineering Ltd and headquartered in Huddersfield, remains a supplier of heavy transmission systems for industrial, defense, railway and marine applications. These include transmissions for the British Challenger 2 tanks and American Bradley Fighting Vehicles. Railway transmissions are produced for their Chinese branch 'David Brown China', in a joint partnership called 'Jiangsu Shinri David Brown Gear Systems' at a factory in Changzhou near Shanghai.

=== Sale by Textron 2008 ===
In September 2008 it was announced that David Brown Gear systems and associated companies, David Brown Hydraulics based in Poole in Dorset, Maag Pumps of Switzerland, and Union Pumps of the USA were to be sold to Clyde Blowers of Scotland in a £368 million deal.

in 2016 David Brown was merged with Santasalo to form David Brown Santasalo. The joint company now remains in the hands of N4 Partners.

== Products ==
=== David Brown tractor range ===
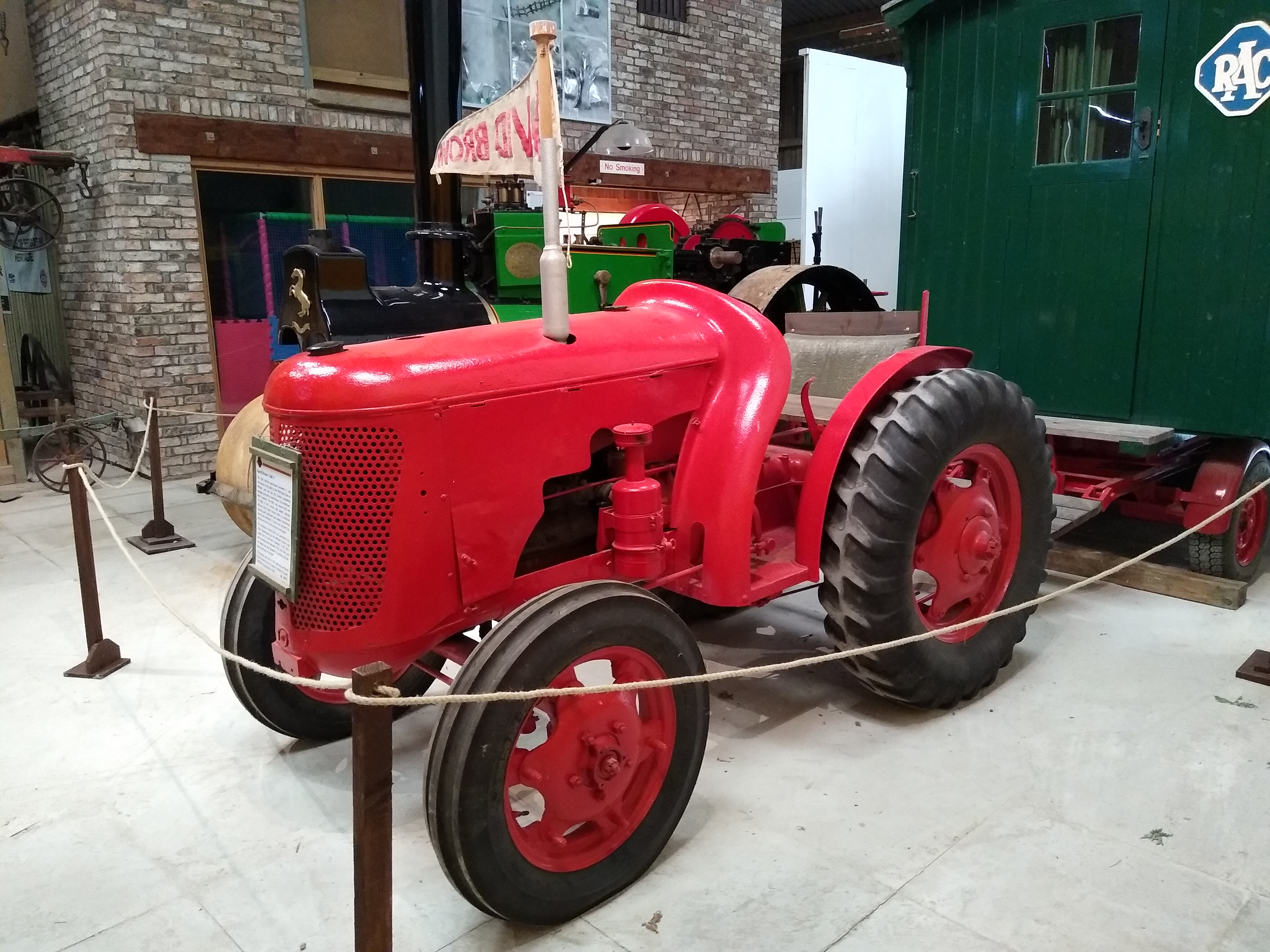
VAK 1

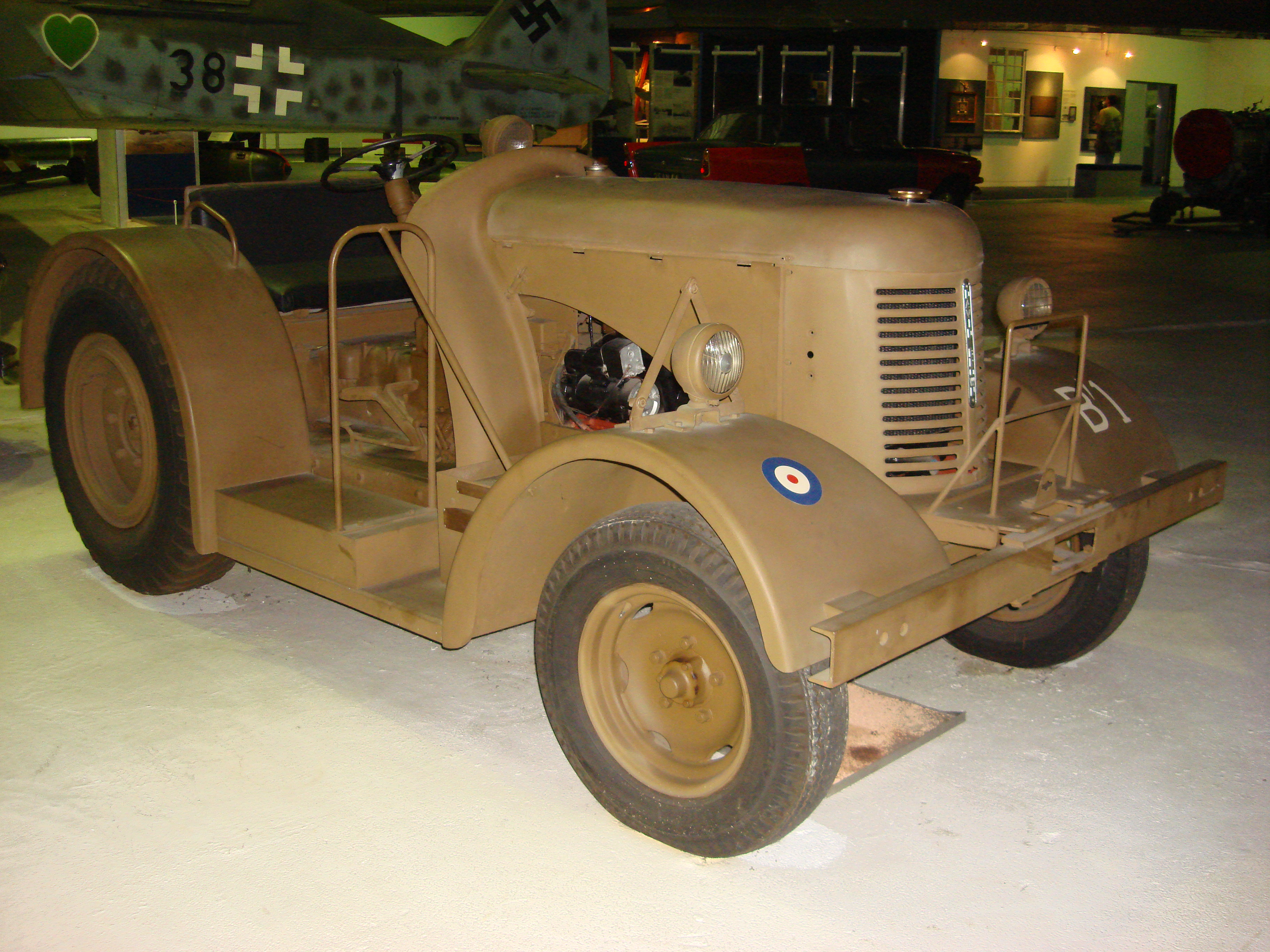
David Brown light diesel tractor Mk2 at the RAF Museum, London

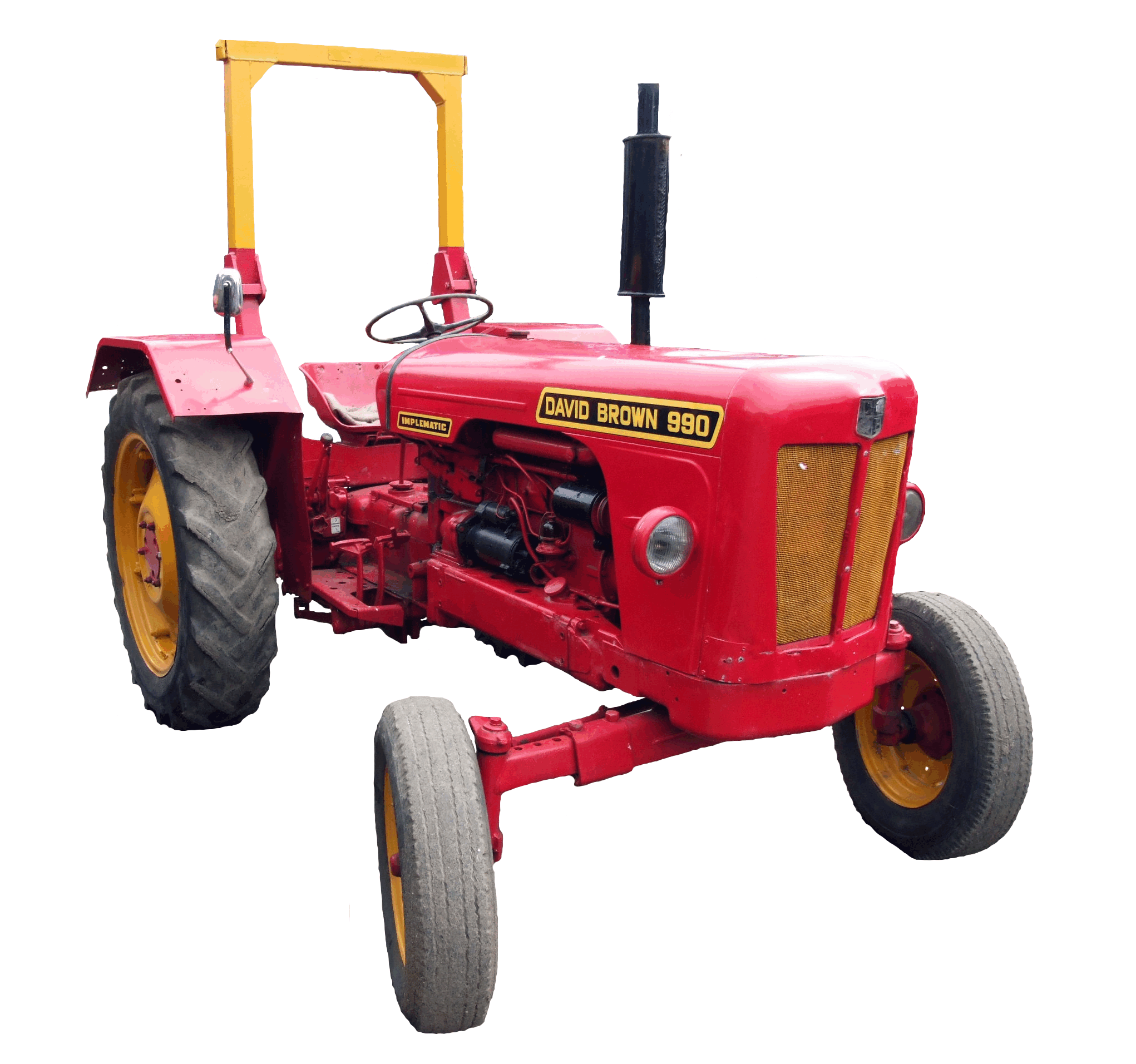
David Brown 990 Implematic Tractor Made in Meltham around 1964

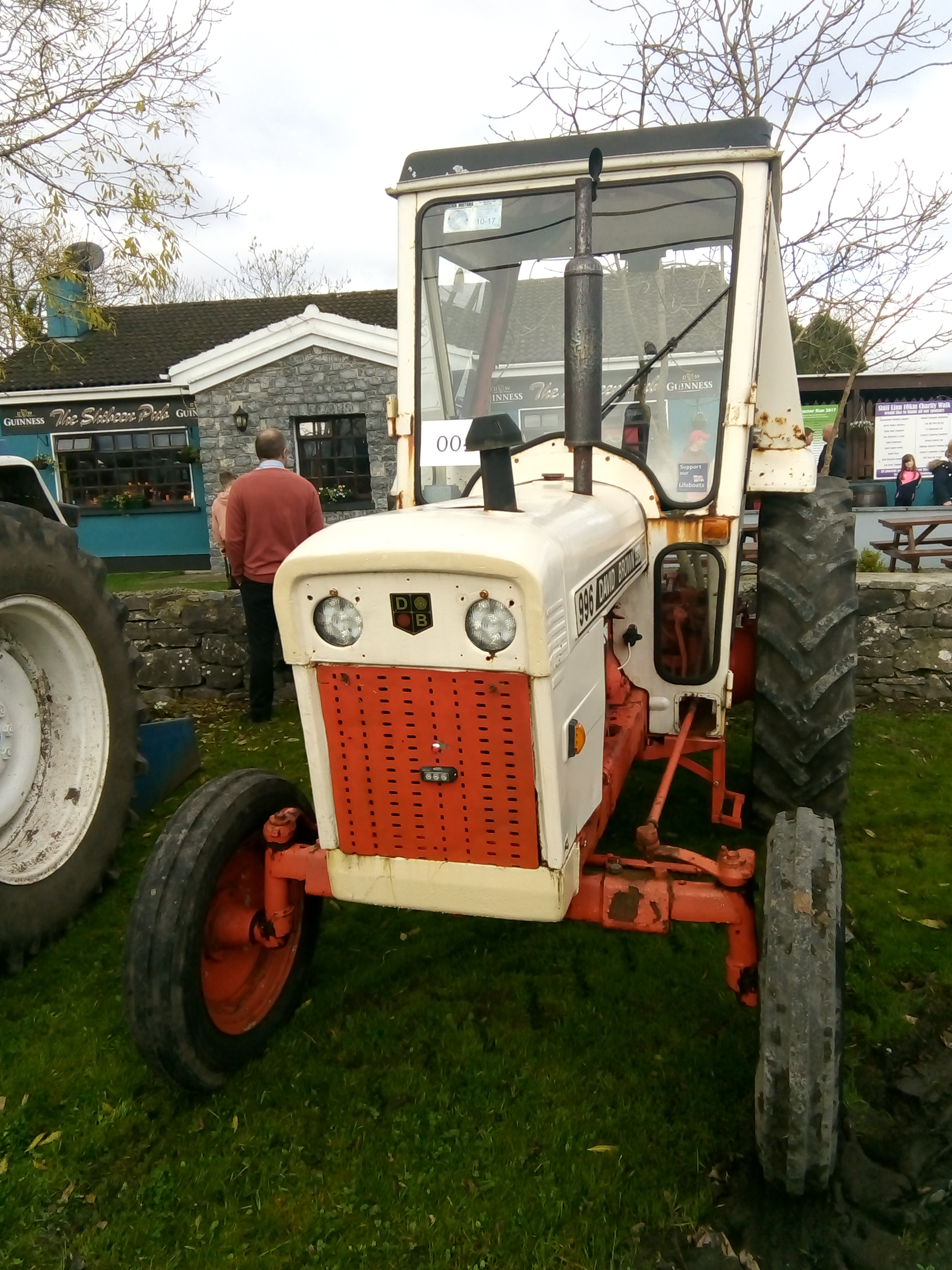
David Brown 996 Synchromesh tractor (1970s)

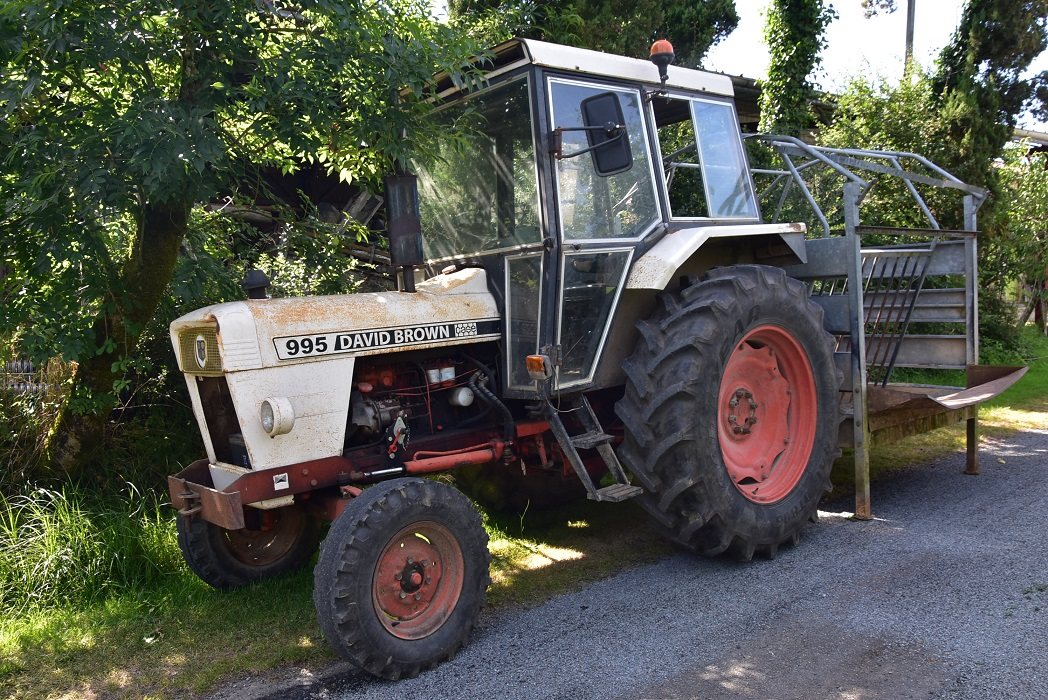
DB 995-Case, France

- VAK1 — 1939–1945
- VTK1 & VIG1 — 1941–1949
- VAK1A — 1945–1947
- VAK1C Cropmaster — 1947–1954
- DB4 — 1942–1949 (110 built)
- Taskmaster — 1948–1965
- 50TD Trackmaster — 1950–1963
- 30TD Trackmaster — 1953– ?
- DB25 & DB30 — 1953–1958
- VAD 50D — 1953–1959
- 900 series 1955–1957
- VAD 12 2D — 1956–1964 lightweight tool carrier
- 950 Implematic series — 1958–1961
- 850 Implematic series — 1961–1965
- 750 Farmatic series — 19??– ?
- 880 Implematic series — 1961–1965
- 990 Implematic series — 1961–1965
- 770 Selectamatic series — 1965–1970
- 880 Selectamatic series — 1965–1971
- 990 Selectamatic series — 1965–1971
- 1200 Selectamatic series — 1967–1971
- 780 Selectamatic series — 1965–1971
- 885 Synchromesh 1971–1979
- 990,995,996 Synchromesh 1971–1979
- 1210 Manual Gearbox 1971–1979
- 1212 Hydra-Shift 1971–1979
- 1410 Manual Gearbox first turbocharged David Brown 1974–1979
- 1412 Hydra-Shift first turbocharged David Brown 1974–1979
- 1190 series — 1979–1983
- 1290 series — 1979–1983
- 1390 series — 1979–1983
- 1490 series — 1979–1983
- 1690 series — 1979–1982
- 1690 Turbo series — 1982–1983
- 1194 series — 1983–1988
- 1294 series — 1983–1988
- 1394 series — 1983–1988
- 1494 series — 1983–1988
- 1594 series — 1983–1988
- 1694 series — 1983–1988

Export models

- 775 Selectamatic German market
- 3800 (780 petrol) American market
- 4600 (880 petrol) American market
- Oliver 500–600 rebadged 850 and 950 American market
