= List of Worcestershire cricket captains =

Worcestershire County Cricket Club are an English cricket club based in Worcester, Worcestershire. The club was founded in 1865 and played their first first-class cricket match in 1899 after being accepted into the County Championship. The club have played both List A cricket and Twenty20 cricket since their introductions into the English game in 1963 and 2003 respectively.

== Key ==
- Years denotes the years in which the player was named as official club captain for Worcestershire.
- First denotes the date of the first match in which the player captained Worcestershire.
- Last denotes the date of the last match in which the player captained Worcestershire.
- FC denotes the number of first-class matches in which the player captained Worcestershire.
- LA denotes the number of List A matches in which the player captained Worcestershire.
- T20 denotes the number of Twenty20 matches in which the player captained Worcestershire.
- Total denotes the total number of first-class, List A and Twenty20 matches in which the player captained Worcestershire.

== Official captains ==
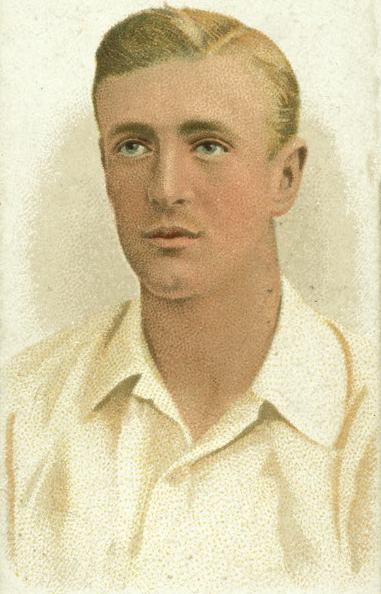
Harry Foster was the first official captain of Worcestershire

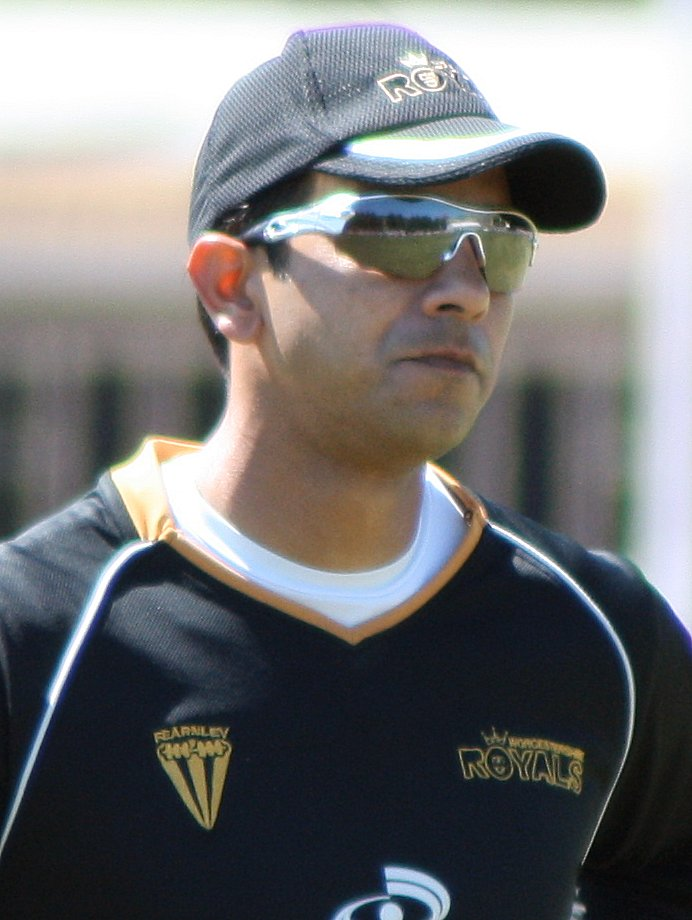
Vikram Solanki captained Worcestershire to the 2007 Pro40 title

No.	Name	Nationality	Years	First	Last	FC	LA	T20	Total	Refs
1	Harry Foster	England	1899–1900; 1902–1910; 1913	4 May 1899	25 August 1920	214	–	–	214	
2	Reginald Foster	England	1901	13 August 1900	17 June 1907	24	–	–	24	
3	George Simpson-Hayward	England	1911–1912	22 June 1908	22 June 1914	47	–	–	47	
4	William Taylor	England	1914–1919; 1922	9 May 1914	19 August 1922	45	–	–	45	
5	Maurice Jewell	England	1920–1921; 1926; 1928–1929	23 June 1919	31 May 1933	81	–	–	81	
6	Maurice Foster	England	1923–1925	9 August 1909	20 June 1934	86	–	–	86	
7	Cecil Ponsonby	England	1927	4 May 1927	29 August 1928	27	–	–	27	
8	John Coventry	England	1929–1930	8 June 1927	23 August 1930	23	–	–	23	
9	Cyril Walters	England	1931–1935	3 May 1930	3 August 1935	127	–	–	127	
10	Charles Lyttelton	England	1936–1939	25 July 1934	30 August 1939	82	–	–	82	
11	Sandy Singleton	England	1946	23 August 1939	24 August 1946	24	–	–	24	
12	Allan White	England	1947–1949	21 June 1939	10 August 1949	65	–	–	65	
13	Bob Wyatt	England	1949–1951	7 June 1947	29 August 1951	41	–	–	41	
14	Ronald Bird	England	1952–1954	21 May 1949	14 August 1954	107	–	–	107	
15	Reg Perks	England	1955	27 May 1950	31 August 1955	50	–	–	50	
16	Peter Richardson	England	1956–1958	20 June 1953	3 September 1958	61	–	–	61	
17	Don Kenyon	England	1959–1967	18 June 1958	30 August 1967	260	10	–	270	
18	Tom Graveney	England	1968–1970	15 May 1965	6 September 1970	69	33	–	102	
19	Norman Gifford	England	1971–1980	4 June 1969	15 May 1982	204	206	–	410	
20	Glenn Turner	New Zealand	1981	22 May 1971	13 September 1981	40	28	–	68	
21	Phil Neale	England	1982–1991	25 July 1981	26 July 1991	229	221	–	450	
22	Tim Curtis	England	1992–1995	28 May 1988	13 June 1995	84	87	–	171	
23	Tom Moody	Australia	1995–1999	15 June 1995	12 September 1999	64	83	–	147	
24	Graeme Hick	England	2000–2002	16 July 1997	19 June 2005	57	70	1	128	
25	Ben Smith	England	2003–2004	22 September 2002	12 June 2005	32	40	10	82	
26	Steve Rhodes	England	2004	6 June 1993	9 September 2004	28	23	–	51	
27	Vikram Solanki	England	2005–2010	20 June 2001	9 August 2010	85	85	39	173	
28	Daryl Mitchell	England	2010–2016	11 June 2010	20 September 2016	101	60	79	240	
29	Joe Leach	England	2017-2021	10 June 2016	25 September 2017	14	10	14	38	
30	Brett D'Oliveira	England	2022 to date	7 April 2022	26 September 2022	13	-	-	-	

== Unofficial captains ==
This is a list of players who have captained Worcestershire without having been appointed official club captain.

Name	Nationality	First	Last	FC	LA	T20	Total	Refs
Granville Bromley-Martin	England	30 July 1903	30 July 1903	1	–	–	1	
Geoffrey Foster	England	13 July 1905	7 July 1910	5	–	–	5	
Reginald Brinton	England	10 May 1906	18 June 1906	2	–	–	2	
William Hutchings	England	26 July 1906	26 July 1906	1	–	–	1	
William Burns	England	5 August 1909	4 August 1913	17	–	–	17	
Charles Frederick Lyttelton	England	1 September 1910	1 September 1910	1	–	–	1	
George Crowe	England	31 July 1911	31 July 1911	1	–	–	1	
J. W. Cecil Turner	England	4 August 1919	27 July 1921	2	–	–	2	
Humphrey Gilbert	England	7 June 1922	18 July 1928	3	–	–	3	
Leonard Crawley	England	12 August 1922	12 August 1922	1	–	–	1	
Harry Higgins	England	23 May 1923	23 May 1923	1	–	–	1	
John Higgins	England	27 July 1927	25 August 1928	9	–	–	9	
Denys Hill	England	28 April 1928	11 August 1928	10	–	–	10	
Albert Lane	England	2 May 1928	29 June 1929	5	–	–	5	
Bernard Quaife	England	1 August 1928	28 August 1937	65	–	–	65	
Denis Evers	England	12 June 1937	29 June 1938	4	–	–	4	
Roger Human	England	25 August 1937	10 August 1938	5	–	–	5	
Bob Crisp	South Africa	11 June 1938	11 June 1938	1	–	–	1	
Harold Gibbons	England	22 June 1938	27 May 1939	2	–	–	2	
Cecil Pullan	England	16 July 1938	13 August 1938	2	–	–	2	
George Abell	England	7 June 1939	5 July 1939	3	–	–	3	
Charles Palmer	England	13 August 1949	17 August 1949	2	–	–	2	
Joseph Lister	England	11 June 1955	27 June 1959	2	–	–	2	
George Chesterton	England	17 August 1955	17 August 1955	1	–	–	1	
Roly Jenkins	England	26 May 1956	7 June 1958	24	–	–	24	
George Dews	England	11 June 1960	19 August 1961	7	–	–	7	
Martin Horton	England	17 June 1961	12 June 1965	9	–	–	9	
Bob Broadbent	England	2 June 1962	2 June 1962	1	–	–	1	
Roy Booth	England	16 August 1961	4 September 1968	20	–	–	20	
Alan Ormrod	England	14 May 1966	24 June 1978	2	–	–	2	
Dick Richardson	England	26 July 1967	26 July 1967	1	–	–	1	
Doug Slade	England	12 July 1969	12 July 1969	1	–	–	1	
Ron Headley	West Indies	20 June 1971	16 June 1974	14	9	–	23	
Basil D'Oliveira	England	14 August 1971	7 August 1976	2	1	–	3	
Ted Hemsley	England	29 May 1974	29 June 1980	5	2	–	7	
Greg Watson	Australia	30 August 1978	30 August 1978	1	–	–	1	
David Humphries	England	24 August 1980	12 June 1985	1	1	–	2	
Dipak Patel	New Zealand	15 June 1983	25 August 1985	5	1	–	6	
Ian Botham	England	28 April 1988	13 May 1989	3	5	–	8	
Neal Radford	England	11 June 1989	11 June 1989	–	1	–	1	
Richard Illingworth	England	17 June 1994	17 June 1994	1	–	–	1	
Phil Weston	England	10 August 1999	10 August 1999	1	–	–	1	
Stephen Peters	England	8 May 2005	8 May 2005	1	–	–	1	
Gareth Batty	England	22 June 2005	30 June 2009	6	4	9	19	
Moeen Ali	England	11 May 2011	29 May 2011	3	2	–	5	
Saeed Ajmal	Pakistan	5 August 2015	5 August 2015	–	1	–	1	
Alex Gidman	England	7 August 2015	18 August 2015	1	1	–	2	

== See also ==
- List of Worcestershire County Cricket Club players
