= Jewell (surname) =

Jewell is an English surname, from a Celtic personal name composed of elements meaning 'lord' + 'generous', 'bountiful'. The name does not derive from the gemstone jewel.

Notable people with this name include the following:

== Surname ==
- Archie Jewell (1888–1917), English sailor who survived the sinking of the Titanic
- Arthur Jewell (1888–1922), English cricketer
- Buddy Jewell, country music singer
- Delyth Jewell (born 1987 or 1988), Welsh politician
- Eilen Jewell, American singer, band-leader and songwriter based in Boise, Idaho
- Fred Jewell (1875–1936), composer and circus musician
- Geri Jewell, American actress
- Isabel Jewell (1907–1972), American film actress
- Jacob Jewell (d. 1884), circus owner
- Jake Jewell, American baseball player
- James Jewell (disambiguation), several people
- Jennyfer Jewell, New Zealand television actress
- Jerry Jewell, American voice actor
- Jimmy Jewell (disambiguation), several people
- John Jewel or Jewell (1522–1571), Bishop of Salisbury, England
- John Jewell (South African cricketer) (1891–1966)
- Josey Jewell (born 1994), American football player
- Catharine Newsome Jewell (1869-1936), American opera singer
- Liam Jewell (born 1968), Canadian sprint canoer
- Lisa Jewell, British novelist
- Marshall Jewell (1825–1883), Governor of Connecticut
- Maurice Jewell (1885–1978), English cricketer
- Nick Jewell, Australian footballer and cricketer
- Norman Jewell (1913–2004), Royal Naval officer notable for his involvement in the World War II Operation Mincemeat
- Paul Jewell (born 1964), English footballer and manager
- Philip "Jimmy" Jewell (1953–1987), Welsh rock climber
- Richard Jewell (1962–2007), American security guard falsely accused in the bombing of the 1996 Olympic Games
- Richard G. Jewell, president of Grove City College
- Richard Roach Jewell (1810–1891), architect
- Sally Jewell, former United States Secretary of the Interior and CEO of REI
- Slater Jewell-Kemker (born 1992), American-Canadian filmmaker and climate activist
- Theodore Frelinghuysen Jewell (1844–1932), Rear Admiral, United States Navy
- Tony Jewell (footballer) (born 1943), Australian rules football player
- Tyler Jewell (born 1977), American snowboarder
- William S. Jewell (1867–1956), American lawyer and politician
- William Jewell (educator) (1789–1852), founder of William Jewell College in Missouri, US

== Given name ==
Jewell is also occasionally used as a given name (or stage name), peaking in the late 1800s and early 1900s as a unisex given name.

=== Men ===
- Jewell James Ebers (1921–1959), American electrical engineer
- Jewell Hicks, American architect
- Jewell James (born 1953), Lummi Nation master carver of totem poles, author, and an environmental activist
- Jewell Jones (born 1995), American politician
- Jewell Patek (born 1971), American politician and lobbyist
- Jewell Stovall (1907–1974), American Delta blues singer and guitarist
- Jewell Wallace (1907–1999), American football player and coach
- Jewell Waugh (1910–2006), American politician
- Jewell Williams (born 1957), American politician
- Jewell Young (1913–2003), American basketball player

=== Women ===
- Jewell (singer) (1968–2022), R&B singer signed to Death Row Records in the early 1990s
- Jewell Jean Busken (1975–1996), American student
- Jewell Jeannette Glass (1888–1966), American mineralogist and geosciences educator
- Jewell Loyd (born 1993), American professional basketball player
- Jewell Mazique (1913–2007), American activist
- Jewell Jackson McCabe (born 1945), founder of the National Coalition of 100 Black Women
- Jewell Parker Rhodes (born 1954), American bestselling novelist and educator

== See also ==
- Jewelle Gomez (born 1948), American feminist writer
