= Sidney Freeman =

English cricketer

Sidney Thomas Freeman (21 August 1888 – 6 June 1971) was an English cricketer, who played six first-class matches between 1919 and 1921, three each for Gloucestershire and HK Foster's XI.

Promising debut in 1920.

Excerpt from The Evening Star and Daily Herald, Thursday, June 24, 1920:

"Although everything was dwarfed by the brilliant innings of 144 by F. G. Robinson. great credit must be given to S. T. Freeman, a young amateur, who was making his first appearance for Gloucestershire. The importance of the occasion seemed to affect him not at all, and playing extremely confidently from the outset, he put together 45 of the best by sound cricket, his partnership with his captain releasing 158 runs in ninety-five minutes."

All of Freeman's ten first-class wickets came in his two games for HK Foster's XI, both against Worcestershire in 1919. His best figures of 4-31 were achieved on his debut that July at Hereford, his first wicket being that of Arthur Jewell, the nephew of future Worcestershire captain Maurice Jewell. In another match against the same opponents in August he was caught and bowled for 58, a career best score, by John Coventry, another future Worcestershire captain; this was Coventry's first first-class wicket. A nice symmetry was achieved when Freeman in turn dismissed Coventry in the second innings.

Freeman's last game was against Glamorgan, playing in only their third first-class match; Gloucestershire won by the emphatic margin of an innings and 191 runs, but Freeman contributed only five runs (albeit not out) and a catch; he did not bowl a ball.

Freeman was born in Norton, Gloucester; he died in Whitbourne, Herefordshire at the age of 82.
