= James Whitaker (journalist) =

English journalist (1940–2012)

James Edward Anthony Whitaker (1 October 1940 – 15 February 2012) was an English journalist, specialising in the British royal family.

== Early life ==
Born in Cheltenham, elder son of George Edward Dudley Whitaker, OBE (1916–1983), and Mary Evelyn Austin, née Haslett (died 1989). George Whitaker, of Wolverton Park, Wolverton, Milton Keynes, Buckinghamshire, was managing director of Sperry Rand by 1972, having previously been a sales director and general manager at Fisher Humphries & Co. Ltd and Salopian Engineers Ltd, manufacturers of agricultural equipment. The Whitaker family had owned an estate, Caldwell (alternately given as "Caldewell"), near Pershore, Worcestershire; George Whitaker's mother, Daisy, was sister of the cricketers Maurice Jewell, Arthur Jewell, and John Jewell, they being children of Maurice Jewell, of Hall Place, Bexley, Kent, vice-consul at Chile.

Whitaker was educated at Cheltenham College, then worked as an articled clerk in an accountancy firm, before in 1963, becoming a reporter at the Hounslow, Brentford and Chiswick Post.

== Career ==
In 1966, Whitaker scored his first scoop when he went undercover working as a cloakroom attendant in the newly opened Playboy Club in London. In 1967, he moved to the Daily Mail, and in 1971, joined the William Hickey column team at the Daily Express.

In 1975, he joined The Sun, where he struck up a lifelong friendship with Royal photographer Arthur Edwards. As a result, in 1979, he joined the team on the launch of the Daily Star as its Royal reporter. He then moved to the Daily Mirror.

In November 1982, the Daily Mirror assistant editor, Anne Robinson, attended a formal dinner attended by Queen Elizabeth II, at which she noted that Diana, Princess of Wales arrived late. Robinson asked Whitaker to investigate and, after conversations with various sources, including Diana's sister Lady Sarah McCorquodale, confirmed that Diana was suffering from an eating disorder, then identified as anorexia, in a scoop article on 19 November. As a result, the Buckingham Palace Press Secretary, Michael Shea, rang then Mirror's editor Mike Molloy to demand the removal of those involved in the story. Robinson left the paper to start her television career, and it was later confirmed that Diana suffered from bulimia.

Whitaker wrote the book Diana v. Charles which chronicled the deterioration of the relationship between Diana and Prince Charles.

Whitaker was Royal Correspondent for the ITV television programme This Morning. In 2004, he took part in the reality television programme Celebrity Fit Club and was made team captain for the final three weeks and "Mr Fit Club 2004". He was one of three judges on Australia's Australian Princess television programme.

== Death ==
Whitaker was diagnosed with cancer in early 2011. He had operations and chemotherapy. Whitaker died on 15 February 2012. In 1965, he had married Iwona, daughter of Andrzej Karol Milde, of Poland; she survived him, as did their two sons and daughter.
