= John Coventry (cricketer) =

English cricketer (1903–1969)

Personal information
- Full name: John Bonynge Coventry
- Born: 9 January 1903; Westminster, London, England
- Died: 4 July 1969 (aged 66); Pirton Court, Worcestershire, England
- Batting: Right-handed
- Bowling: Slow left-arm orthodox

Career statistics
Competition	FC
Matches	75
Runs scored	1,774
Batting average	14.78
100s/50s	0/5
Top score	86
Balls bowled	1,154
Wickets	16
Bowling average	45.81
5 wickets in innings	0
10 wickets in match	0
Best bowling	2/18
Catches/stumpings	28/0
- Source: CricketArchive, 3 May 2009

The Honourable John Bonynge Coventry (9 January 1903 – 4 July 1969) was an English cricketer who played 75 times in first-class cricket for Worcestershire between 1919 and 1935, captaining the county for the latter part of the 1929 and the whole of the 1930 seasons, although he played in only July and August of the latter year.

== Early career ==
Born in Westminster, Coventry was educated at Eton and Oxford, although he did not gain a blue at university. He made his first-class debut for Worcestershire in August 1919 against HK Foster's XI, taking the wickets of Sidney Freeman and Howard Battersea but being dismissed for nought in his only innings. The following season Worcestershire rejoined the County Championship and Coventry played three matches, all in August, taking six wickets — the most he was to achieve in a single season — including the wickets of both Percy Holmes and Herbert Sutcliffe in the same innings of the match against Yorkshire. For the next two seasons Coventry played little first-class cricket — though in 1922 he made his highest score, 86 against Derbyshire — but in 1923 he made 18 appearances, scoring 544 runs and making two more half-centuries. A poor 1924 followed, in which he managed just 220 runs in 11 innings,

== Captaincy and later career ==
In July 1929, Coventry returned to the Worcestershire side as captain, replacing Maurice Jewell who had resigned as a result of poor health. He scored 412 runs and hit two fifties that season, while in August he took his first wicket for six years when he had Leicestershire's George Geary caught by Peter Jackson. Coventry remained as captain for the following season, despite playing in only eight games, but in 1931 he was himself replaced by Cyril Walters. After that, Coventry played only four more first-class games, with no more half-centuries and only one more wicket, which was to prove his last, although the victim was another big name in Bob Wyatt.

His final appearance came, after a two-year gap, in June 1935 against Leicestershire; he bowed out quietly with 4 and 11 not out and did not bowl, though he did hold a catch to dismiss Alan Shipman off the bowling of Reg Perks.

== Outside cricket ==
Coventry was a partner in Tattersalls, and served as Mayor of Worcester in 1929 and 1930.

In the Second World War, he was in the Grenadier Guards.

He stood as a Conservative in Carmarthen in 1929, but was unsuccessful.

== Cricketing relations ==
His uncle Charles Coventry played two Test matches for England in 1888–89, and also played for Worcestershire before their elevation to first-class status. Another uncle, Henry Coventry, played two first-class games for Marylebone Cricket Club (MCC) in 1888. His grandfather, the 9th Earl of Coventry, played for teams including MCC and Worcestershire, but never appeared at first-class level.

Sporting positions
Preceded by Maurice Jewell	Worcestershire County Cricket Captain; 1929–1930	Succeeded by Cyril Walters
