= Greenstock =

Greenstock is a surname. Notable people with the surname include:

- Jeremy Greenstock (born 1943), British diplomat
- John Greenstock (1905–1992), English cricketer
- Nick Greenstock (born 1973), English rugby union footballer
- William Greenstock (1865–1944), English cricketer
