= John Jewell =

John Jewell may refer to:

- John Jewell (South African cricketer) (1891–1966)
- John Jewell (Worcestershire cricketer) (1917–1946), his son
- John Jewell (footballer) (fl. 1909–1932), English footballer
- John Jewel (1522–1571), alias Jewell, Bishop of Salisbury
