= Maurice Foster (English cricketer) =

English cricketer (1889–1940)

Personal information
- Full name: Maurice Kirshaw Foster
- Born: 1 January 1889; Malvern, Worcestershire, England
- Died: 3 December 1940 (aged 51); Borrocop, Lichfield, Staffordshire, England
- Batting: Right-handed
- Bowling: Right-arm medium

Domestic team information
- Years: Team
- 1908–1934: Worcestershire
- 1924–1936: MCC
- FC debut: 6 August 1908 Worcestershire v Lancashire
- Last FC: 4 August 1936 MCC v Ireland

Career statistics
Competition	First-class
Matches	170
Runs scored	8,295
Batting average	28.70
100s/50s	12/40
Top score	158
Balls bowled	342
Wickets	3
Bowling average	94.00
5 wickets in innings	0
10 wickets in match	0
Best bowling	2/17
Catches/stumpings	140/4
- Source: CricketArchive, 21 September 2007

Maurice Kirshaw Foster (1 January 1889 – 3 December 1940) was an English first-class cricketer who played in 170 matches. The great bulk of these (157) were for Worcestershire, which he captained for three seasons from 1923 to 1925. Foster also played first-class cricket for seven other teams, including the Gentlemen and Marylebone Cricket Club (MCC). He was one of seven Foster brothers to play for Worcestershire, and one of three to captain the side.

Though not a specialist wicket-keeper, he acted as such for Worcestershire on a more than 20 occasions in the 1920s, while his strictly occasional bowling brought him three wickets, and for Worcestershire against Surrey in 1909 he dismissed Jack Hobbs for 1.

After a couple of games in Worcestershire's Second XI in 1907, Foster made his first-class debut for the county in August of the following year, against Lancashire at Worcester, and made 20 in his only innings. He played twice more that season, and ten times in 1909, but without great success. There then followed the first of several gaps in his cricketing career as a consequence of his business commitments.

Though he played occasional minor games in Malaya over the next few years, he did not return to first-class cricket until 1914, in which season he played 19 matches, all in the County Championship. In scoring 1,103 runs at 31.51, he passed a thousand runs for the first time; he also hit two hundreds: 118 against Leicestershire in May, and what was to remain a career-best 158 (in a losing cause) against Derbyshire in August.

The First World War then intervened, although Foster did play one first-class game during hostilities, in India in November 1917. This was a game staged at Calcutta between the Bengal Governor's XI (for whom Foster appeared, scoring 0 and 14) and the Maharaja of Cooch-Behar's XI. The match was staged in aid of the "Our Day" Fund. The Governor's side were bowled out for 33 and 59, losing by an innings to the Maharaja's team, who made 138. Unusually, only two bowlers were used in each of the three innings in the match.

Foster returned to Worcestershire action in 1920, although for three seasons his continuing overseas business meant that his appearances remained limited. However, in 1923 he was able to play a full season, and for four years he was highly successful, scoring over 1,300 runs in each summer, making a total of ten hundreds. In the weak Worcestershire team of that era, Roy Genders considered that he "carr[ied] the side on his shoulders". Foster was especially productive in June 1924, when he hit three centuries, and shortly afterwards was chosen for the Gentlemen against the Players at both The Oval and Lord's, albeit with very little personal success.

He captained the side between 1923 and 1925, although it was the following year, after he had relinquished the role to previous incumbent Maurice Jewell, that saw his heaviest run-scoring: 1,615 first-class runs at 32.95, with three hundreds and 12 fifties, including a hundred in each innings (141 and 106) against Hampshire. However, this was to be his last full season of first-class cricket, and he never again made a first-class fifty. He played three games in 1927, then nothing until his final four matches for the county seven years later, although he had turned out in the 1933 Minor Counties Championship for Staffordshire.

In 1935, Foster played for MCC against Ireland at Lord's in a minor match, then in early August 1936 played in an equivalent match, but one which did qualify as first-class, at Dublin. In this, his final first-class game, Foster both captained and kept wicket, and brought off the stumping of Ireland opener Francis Connell. He made no other dismissals, and his 18 and 47 could not prevent a heavy defeat. He then played club cricket for Walsall Cricket Club until shortly before his death; the club won the Birmingham League three times while he was there.

As mentioned above, six of his brothers played first-class cricket, as did three nephews (Christopher Foster, Peter Foster and John Greenstock) and his brother-in-law William Greenstock.

== Notes ==
Sporting positions
Preceded by William Taylor	Worcestershire County Cricket Captain; 1923–1925	Succeeded by Maurice Jewell
