= Perks (surname) =

Perks is a surname.

== List of people with the surname ==
- Ellis Perks (born 1997), British speedway rider
- George Thomas Perks (1819–1877), British Methodist
- Gord Perks (born 1963), Canadian environmentalist, politician and writer
- Marcelle Perks, British author and journalist
- Micah Perks (born 1963), American writer and memoirist
- Reg Perks (1911–1977), English cricketer
- Robert Perks (1849–1934), British politician
- Sarah Perks, English curator and art and film producer
- Thomas Perks (1883–1953), English cricketer
- William George Perks, better known as Bill Wyman, bassist of the Rolling Stones

== See also ==
- Parks (surname)
- Perkins
- Perks (disambiguation)
