= Jimmy Jewell =

Jimmy Jewell may refer to:

- Jimmy Jewell (association football) (1898–1952), English football manager
- Jimmy Jewel (1909–1995), English comedian and actor
- Jimmy Jewell (saxophonist) (born 1945), British saxophonist
- Jimmy Jewell (climber) (1953–1987), British rock climber

== See also ==
- Jewell (surname)
- James Jewell (disambiguation)
