= William Greenstock =

South African-born English cricketer

William Greenstock (15 January 1865 – 13 November 1944) was a Cape Colony-born English first-class cricketer. Born in Keiskammahoek, Cape Colony he nevertheless played all his cricket in England. A right-handed batsman and occasional off-spinner, Greenstock appeared only seven times in first-class cricket, but these matches spanned a period of well over thirty years.

Educated at Fettes College he won an exhibition to St John's College, Cambridge in 1884 and made his first-class debut for Cambridge University against Yorkshire on 3 June 1886. Cambridge won the game by 26 runs, but Greenstock's personal contribution was forgettable as he made only 4* and 6. He appeared twice more for the university the following season, making what was to prove his career-best innings of 49 against CI Thornton's XI.

On graduating in 1887 Greenstock embarked on a career as a schoolmaster holding positions at Clifton College (1888–1892), Malvern College (1892–1928) and in retirement as an assistant housemaster at Harrow School.

Twelve years after graduating, Greenstock reappeared in the first-class game in 1899 when he appeared twice for Worcestershire, who were in their first season of county cricket. Scores of 16, 8, 11 and 13 were not impressive, however, and he again dropped out of the side for a long period. Recalled for a match against Somerset in August 1914, he was bowled for 1 in the first innings and not required to bat in the second; again he was dropped and World War I put paid to any chance of a speedy return to the side.

Greenstock's final outing in the first-class game was to come in a game against HK Foster's XI at New Road in August 1919. By now Greenstock was 54 years old, yet still managed a creditable 37 runs in the match, 33 of these coming in the first innings. That was to mark the end of his career, and he died in Pilcot, Dogmersfield, Hampshire at the age of 79.

Greenstock was the brother-in-law of the famous Foster brothers. His nephews Christopher and Peter also had short first-class careers, while his son John played for Worcestershire in the 1920s.
