= Wietmarschen =

- Municipality
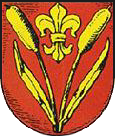
- Flag Coat of arms

- Location of Wietmarschen within Grafschaft Bentheim district
- Interactive map of Wietmarschen
- Location within Germany Location within Lower Saxony
- Coordinates: 52°32′N 07°08′E
- Country: Germany
- State: Lower Saxony
- District: Grafschaft Bentheim
- Subdivisions: 6 Ortsteile

Government
  - Mayor (2021–26): Manfred Wellen (CDU)

Area
  - Total: 119.83 km^{2} (46.27 sq mi)
- Elevation: 21 m (69 ft)

Population (2025-12-31)
  - Total: 12,929
  - Density: 107.89/km^{2} (279.45/sq mi)
- Time zone: UTC+01:00 (CET)
  - Summer (DST): UTC+02:00 (CEST)
- Postal codes: 49835
- Dialling codes: 05908, 05925, 05946
- Vehicle registration: NOH
- Website: www.wietmarschen.de

Wietmarschen (Northern Low Saxon: Wietmöschken) is a unitary municipality (Einheitsgemeinde) in the district of Grafschaft Bentheim in Lower Saxony, Germany. It is split into the villages of Wietmarschen, Füchtenfeld, Schwartenpohl, Lohnerbruch, Nordlohne and Lohne with Lohne being the biggest and having the town hall while Wietmarschen, which is the second biggest, having the name.

== Geography ==
Wietmarschen lies roughly 8 kilometres (5 mi) west of Lingen, and 13 kilometres (8 mi) northeast of Nordhorn. The community's highest elevation is the Rupingberg in Lohne at 50 metres (160 ft) above sea level. There are plans to construct a viewing tower on it.

=== Constituent communities ===
The municipality is divided into six Ortsteile named Wietmarschen, Füchtenfeld, Schwartenpohl, Lohnerbruch, Nordlohne and Lohne.

== Religion ==
The community of Wietmarschen diverges sharply from the rest of the district with regard to religion in that it has a largely Catholic character. In February 2006, the community's religious affiliations broke down thus:

- 74.3% Roman Catholic
- 12.6% Evangelical Lutheran
- 3.9% Evangelical Reformed
- 9.2% other faiths, or no faith

== Politics ==
=== Municipal council ===
Wietmarschen's council is made up of 28 councillors.

- CDU 22 seats
- SPD 5 seats
- FDP 1 seat

(as of the municipal election on 15 September 2016)

The town hall is in Lohne.

=== Mayor ===
The full-time mayor Manfred Wellen was elected on 25 May 2014 with 64.25% of the vote. He was re-elected in 2021.

=== Coat of arms ===
The community's arms show a red field with a stylized lily in the upper half of the middle flanked by a golden bulrush on each side sprouting up from the bottom and tilting away from the lily, and each with a golden leaf.

=== Partnership ===
Wietmarschen is twinned with:

- Mortagne-au-Perche, France since 2 July 1989

== Culture and sightseeing ==
=== Museums ===
- Heimathaus Lohne (local museum)
- Heimathaus Wietmarschen, the so-called Packhaus (local museum)
- Treckermuseum Wietmarschen (tractor museum)

=== Buildings ===
- Stiftskirche Wietmarschen (nunnery church), restored historic nunnery area behind the church
- Stiftsbusch (nunnery copse) with chapels
- Sankt-Antonius-Kirche Lohne (church)
- Mühlenturm Wietmarschen (mill tower)
- Urbrecker (statue of a bog iron miner)
- Glockenturm Südlohne (belltower)
- Schafstall Moormann (sheep pen)

=== Sport venues ===
- 5 gymnasia
- 10 sport fields
- 4 beach volleyball fields
- 2 tennis courts
- 1 big riding centre
- 2 model aircraft fields
- 1 miniature car track
- 1 gliderport

=== Regular events ===
Yearly

- marksmen's festival
- Urbreckerfest
- kermis
- pilgrimage

== Economy and infrastructure ==
=== Public transport ===
- Bus line 161: Lingen — Nordlohne — Lohne — Lohnerbruch — Wietmarschen — Füchtenfeld
- Bus line 165: Lingen — Nordlohne — Lohne — Rükel — Südlohne — Klausheide — Nordhorn
- Nearest railway stations:
  - Lingen (Ems) for Meppen, Leer, Emden, Rheine, Münster
  - Intercity: Düsseldorf, Karlsruhe
  - Bad Bentheim for Rheine, Osnabrück, Bielefeld, Hengelo (Netherlands),
  - Intercity: Hanover, Berlin, Amsterdam (Schiphol)

=== Established businesses ===
- W.A.S, Ambulances and Security Vehicles
- Ewabo, cleaning agent and disinfectant manufacturer
- Wirtschaft Innovation Nordwest, business advisers and advertising agents
- Bauunternehmen Overberg, construction

=== Education ===
Marien-Schule Wietmarschen (elementary school and Hauptschule)

Grundschule Lohne (elementary school)

Schulzentrum Lohne (Hauptschule and Realschule)

== Famous persons ==
- August Perk, German Resistance Fighter against the National Socialism, briefly Friendship with Erich Maria Remarque and had Influence on Remarques world-famous Novel "All Quiet on the Western Front", Grandfather of Johnny de Brest.
- Erich Maria Remarque, writer, worked as a teacher in Lohne in 1919
- Mattias Rosemann, deacon
