= Ronald Bird (disambiguation) =

Ronald Bird may refer to:

- Ronald Bird (1915–1985), English cricketer
- Ronnie Bird (footballer) (1941–2005), English footballer
- Ronnie Bird (Ronald Méhu, born 1946), French singer
