= Perk =

Perk may refer to:

== Places ==
- Perk, Belgium, part of the municipality of Steenokkerzeel
  - Perk Castle, a castle near there
- Perk Summit, Victoria Land, Antarctica

== People ==
- August Perk (1897–1945), anti-Nazi German resistance fighter
- Brian Perk (born 1989), American soccer player
- Ralph Perk (1914–1999), American politician
- nickname of Percy Galbraith (1898–1961), Canadian National Hockey League forward
- nickname of Kendrick Perkins (born 1984), American National Basketball Association player

== Other uses ==
- Perk (company), a travel and expense management company
- Perquisite, or perk, various non-wage compensations provided to an employee in addition to cash wages
- Tetrachloroethylene, a chemical used for dry-cleaning, referred to in British English as Perk
- Thermodynamic beta, a fundamental quantity in statistical mechanics
- EIF2AK3, a human enzyme, often abbreviated as PERK
- Perk, a bonus which gives a video game character a special ability

== See also ==
- PERC (disambiguation)
- Perks (disambiguation)
- PERQ, a workstation computer
