= Fostershire =

English cricket club nickname

‘Fostershire’ was a name jocularly applied to Worcestershire County Cricket Club in the early part of the 20th century, shortly after the county had achieved first-class status and admission into the English County Championship (in 1899). The name came from the fact that seven brothers from the Foster family played for Worcestershire during this period, three of whom captained the club at some point. Their father was the Rev. Henry Foster (1844–1933), who taught at Malvern College. He married in 1871 Sophia Mary Harper, daughter of Samuel Harper of Upper Tooting, of Lloyd's of London.

The full list, with Worcestershire careers in brackets is: Basil Samuel (1902–11), Geoffrey Norman (1903–14), Henry Knollys (’Harry’) (1899–1925), Maurice Kirshaw (1908–34), Neville John Acland (1914–23), Reginald Erskine (’Tip’) (1899–1912) and Wilfrid Lionel (’Bill’) (1899–1911).

On only two occasions did four of the brothers play in a first-class match together. In both cases the brothers involved were Geoffrey, Harry, Tip and Wilfrid. The matches, both in August 1905, were against the Australians at Worcester and against Somerset at Taunton.

Against Hampshire in July 1899, Bill (who scored 140 and 172 not out) and Tip (134 and 101 not out) both scored their maiden first-class centuries in the first innings, and became the first pair of brothers to score two separate centuries each in the same first-class match. This feat has since been emulated by Ian Chappell and Greg Chappell in a Test match in 1974, but remains unique in county cricket.

Against Kent in 1905, Tip (246 not out), Harry (86) and Geoffrey (54) combined to lead Worcestershire to a club record total of 627 for 9 declared. The following year against Warwickshire, Harry (124) and Tip (35) contributed to a team total of 633, a club record which would not be surpassed until 1995.

== The Foster brothers ==
The Foster brothers came from a family of 11 children (7 sons and four daughters). The brothers were all educated at Malvern College; Harry, Tip and Geoffrey all went on to Oxford University. All seven brothers were primarily right-handed batsmen; Maurice and Geoffrey also occasionally kept wicket, and Tip and Harry occasionally bowled seam-up.

Harry, the oldest brother, made the most appearances and scored the most runs for Worcestershire, and captained Worcestershire for the longest period. His tally of 15,053 runs for the county places him fifteenth on the all-time list. In 1903 he scored 216 against Somerset, the first double century in Worcestershire's first-class history; he also scored 215 in 1908, the first man to score two double centuries for the county.

Nonetheless, Tip is recognised as the finest cricketer of the brothers and was the only brother to represent England - although six of them represented the Marylebone Cricket Club on various occasions, none of the rest were during a match recognised as an international in which the MCC were equated with "England" as a national team. In 1903 he scored 287 on Test debut, setting the record for the highest Test innings (which stood until 1930); the innings remains the highest by an Englishman in Australia and the innings by a Test debutant. Though he was recognised as one of the finest English batsmen of his time, and captained England in three Tests, business commitments restricted him to eight Test appearances. Tip's score of 246 not out in 1905 set the record for the highest innings for Worcestershire. His career was cut short by his death from diabetes at the age of 36; he was the first of the Foster brothers to die.

The following table gives the Foster brothers' career dates and statistics for Worcestershire only, but in all first-class matches, not just those in the County Championship.

Name	Lifespan	Worcestershire career						Other first-class teams	Notes
Name	Lifespan	Span	Matches	Runs Average	High Score 100s / 50s	Wickets	Catches/ Stumpings	Other first-class teams	Notes
Harry Foster	1873–1950	1899–1925	246	15,053; 35.33	216; 28 / 79	11	173	Oxford University; Marylebone Cricket Club (MCC)	Worcs captain 1899–1900, 1902–1910, 1913; Wisden 1911
Wilfrid Foster	1874–1958	1899–1911	29	1,600; 32.65	172*; 3 / 8	0	15	Marylebone Cricket Club (MCC)	
R.E. "Tip" Foster	1878–1914	1899–1912	80	5,699; 44.87	246*; 13 / 29	21	94	England (8 Tests); Oxford University; Marylebone Cricket Club (MCC)	Worcs captain 1901; Wisden 1901
Basil Foster	1882–1959	1902–1911	7	94; 14.76	36; 0 / 0	0	9	Middlesex; Marylebone Cricket Club (MCC)	Played more matches for MCC, and subsequently Middlesex, than for Worcestershire.
Geoffrey Foster	1884–1971	1903–1914	81	4,114; 28.32	175; 7 / 19	2	89/1	Kent; Oxford University; Marylebone Cricket Club (MCC); Europeans	His Worcestershire career ended with World War 1. Afterwards he played sporadic matches for Kent, MCC, Free Forester and Harlequins.
Maurice Foster	1889–1940	1908–1934	157	7,876; 28.70	158; 12 / 39	3	133/3	Marylebone Cricket Club (MCC)	Worcs captain 1923–1925
Neville Foster	1890–1978	1914–1923	8	219; 21.90	40*; 0 / 0	–	5	–	Appeared only in those two seasons, spending the intervening time and indeed most of his life in Malaya.

== Other relations ==
As well as the seven brothers listed in the above table, several other members of the Foster family played first-class cricket:

- Christopher Foster (Worcestershire 1927), son of Henry Foster
- Peter Foster (Oxford University and Kent 1936–1946), son of Geoffrey;
- William Greenstock (Cambridge University and Worcestershire 1886–1919); brother-in-law of the seven brothers;
- John Greenstock (Oxford University and Worcestershire 1924–1927), son of William Greenstock and nephew of the seven brothers.
