= Howard Battersea =

English cricketer

Howard Lawrence Paley Battersea (3 August 1881 – 4 December 1922) was an English cricketer who played a single first-class match, for HK Foster's XI against Worcestershire in August 1919. Batting at number 11, he scored only 1 before being bowled by future Worcestershire captain John Coventry, who was making his debut. Battersea had no success with the ball either: in two innings he bowled 43 wicketless overs and conceded 163 runs.

Battersea was born in Martley, Worcestershire; he died at the early age of 41 in Ide Hill, Sevenoaks, Kent.
