= PERC =

PERC, Perc or perc may refer to:

== People ==
=== Given name ===
- Perc Bushby (1919–1975), Australian rules footballer
- Perc Horne (1890–1990), Australian rugby league footballer
- Perc Horner (1913–2001), Australian rules footballer
- Perc Tucker (1919–1980), Australian politician
  - Perc Tucker Regional Gallery, Townsville, Queensland, Australia
- Perc Westmore (1904–1970), English make-up artist in the United States

=== Family name ===
- Jerneja Perc (1971–2009), Slovenian sprinter
- Matjaž Perc, Slovenian physicist and professor
- Nick Perc (born 2003), Slovenian footballer

== Organizations ==
- Pan-European Regional Council, the European trade union arm of the International Trade Union Confederation
- Propane Education and Research Council, a lobbying organization
- Property and Environment Research Center, a free-market environmentalist think tank

== Science ==
- PERC solar cell, a passivated emitter rear contact (PERC) solar cell
- Tetrachloroethylene or perc, a chemical widely used for dry cleaning and metal-degreasing

=== Medicine ===
- Shortened form of percocet
- Pulmonary Embolism Rule-out Criteria (PERC Rule), a clinical decision-making tool to aid in the diagnosis of chest pain and/or dyspnea

=== Environmental science ===
- Acronym for "preservation, enhancement, restoration or creation (of a natural resource)" in environmental mitigation
- Perc test (percolation test), for determining the water absorption rate of soil
- PERC Reporting Standard, the European standard for mineral reporting

== Other ==
- Abbreviation of percussion (musical instruments)
- Dell PERC (PowerEdge RAID Controller), computer hardware used in Dell PowerEdge servers
- PTC Perc, a line of Java virtual machines acquired by Atego (company)

== See also ==
- Perk (disambiguation)
- PERQ a model of computer
