= Cecil Ponsonby =

English cricketer

Cricket information
- Batting: Right-handed

Career statistics
Competition	First-class
Matches	76
Runs scored	844
Batting average	8.03
100s/50s	0/1
Top score	50*
Catches/stumpings	73/11
- Source: CricInfo, 7 November 2022

Cecil Brabazon Ponsonby (26 December 1889 – 11 May 1945) was an English first-class cricketer: a right-handed batsman and wicket-keeper who played 74 times for Worcestershire between 1911 and 1928, captaining the county in 1927; he also made a single appearance each for Marylebone Cricket Club (MCC) and HK Foster's XI.

Son of Hon. Arthur Cornwallis Ponsonby (1856—1918; 4th son of Walter Ponsonby, 7th Earl of Bessborough) and Kathleen Eva Sillery (d. 1944). Born in Gravesend, Kent, Ponsonby was educated at Eton and Oxford University, but did not get into the team in either case. He made his first-class debut against Leicestershire in July 1911, and immediately made an impact: batting at number eleven, he scored a vital 31 not out in the first innings to help add 61 for the last wicket and set Worcestershire up for a three-wicket victory. He also took four catches in the match, his first career dismissal being that of Cecil Wood.

Ponsonby played only once more that summer, but the following year he made the only first-class fifty of his career, scoring exactly 50 not out for Worcestershire against Surrey, this time batting at seven. However, this was something of a false dawn where his batting was concerned: he did not play again for the county until 1920 (though he batted at five for MCC against Oxford University in 1914), and his Worcestershire batting average never again broke into double figures for a season.

In 1920 Ponsonby returned to first-class cricket, and in his first game, against Sussex, even went in first wicket down in the second innings. He made a duck, and not long afterwards he had returned to what was to become his accustomed place near or at the bottom of the order. His wicket-keeping was more of a success, though it took him until mid-June 1921 to record his first stumping, that of Edward Solbé of Kent.

With one exception, Ponsonby played only a handful of matches in his remaining seven season in the game, doing little with either bat or gloves. That exception was 1927, when he played 26 times and acted as captain, replacing Maurice Jewell. Ponsonby made 34 dismissals (30 caught, four stumped) that year, by some distance his greatest tally for a single summer. He also recorded his highest season's run total, although this was a mere 208 at an average of only 6.30.

He was to play only one more first-class match, against Nottinghamshire in late August 1928. This was a chastening year for Worcestershire: in 30 County Championship matches they won not a single game, and against a Nottinghamshire side containing Larwood, Voce and Staples they were thrashed by an innings and 21 runs. Ponsonby made a pair, but he did manage one final dismissal when he caught Notts' opener George Gunn off the bowling of Charles Tarbox.

Ponsonby died in St John's Wood, London at the age of 55.

Three of Ponsonby's great-uncles played first-class cricket. John, 5th Earl of Bessborough, played five games in the 1830s; Frederick, the 6th Earl, played more than 70 games between 1834 and 1856, and was a founder of both Surrey and I Zingari; while Spencer appeared over 60 times between 1841 and 1862.

Sporting positions
Preceded by Maurice Jewell	Worcestershire County Cricket Captain; 1927	Succeeded by Maurice Jewell
