= Peter Norton (disambiguation) =

Peter Norton (born 1943) is an American programmer, software publisher, author, and philanthropist.

Peter Norton may also refer to:

- Peter Norton (British Army officer) (born 1962), recipient of the George Cross
- Peter Norton, proprietor of Pete's Eats Cafe, a cafe in Wales
- Peter Norton (historian), most known for critique of car-centric approaches

== See also ==
- Peter Norton Computing
- Peter Hill-Norton (1915–2004), Royal Navy officer
