= Bob Wyatt =

English cricketer

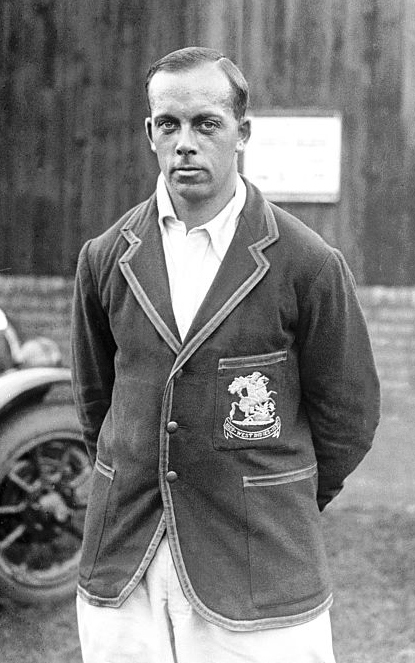
- Wyatt in 1930

Personal information
- Full name: Robert Elliott Storey Wyatt
- Born: 2 May 1901; Milford, Surrey, England
- Died: 20 April 1995 (aged 93); Truro, Cornwall, England
- Batting: Right-handed
- Bowling: Right arm medium

International information
- National side: England
- Test debut (cap 231): 24 December 1927 v South Africa
- Last Test: 3 March 1937 v Australia

Domestic team information
- Years: Team
- 1923–1939: Warwickshire
- 1946–1951: Worcestershire

Career statistics
Competition	Test	First-class
Matches	40	739
Runs scored	1,839	39,405
Batting average	31.70	40.04
100s/50s	2/12	85/208
Top score	149	232
Balls bowled	1,395	65,382
Wickets	18	901
Bowling average	35.66	32.84
5 wickets in innings	0	31
10 wickets in match	0	2
Best bowling	3/4	7/43
Catches/stumpings	16/–	415/1
- Source: Cricinfo, 20 May 2009

Robert Elliott Storey Wyatt (2 May 1901 – 20 April 1995) was an English cricketer who played for Warwickshire, Worcestershire and England in a career lasting nearly thirty years from 1923 to 1951. He was born at Milford Heath House in Surrey and died at Treliske in Truro.

A determined batsman and handy medium pace bowler, Wyatt made his first-class cricket debut in 1923. He played his first Test match against South Africa in Johannesburg in 1927. He was controversially, by replacing Percy Chapman, appointed captain for England's last Test against the dominant Australian touring team in 1930. He was unsuccessful and lost the role to Douglas Jardine for the next few years. Nevertheless, he was one of the Wisden Cricketers of the Year for 1930.

Serving as Jardine's vice-captain on the 1932–1933 tour of Australia, Wyatt was in charge of an early tour match that Jardine sat out of, and became the first captain to employ the controversial Bodyline tactic against Australia. After Jardine resigned following the political and administrative fallout caused by Bodyline, Wyatt was made captain again. He played in 40 test matches, fifteen as captain. He is said to have captained "soundly if without inspiration".

Wyatt was noted for sustaining several injuries during his career but he had a "bulldog spirit". Most famously, a ball bowled by West Indian bowler Manny Martindale hit him in the jaw during a match in Jamaica in 1935. He was carried unconscious from the field with his jaw broken in four places. When he regained consciousness in the dressing room, his first action was to signal for a pencil and paper – when these were supplied he wrote that he attached no blame to Martindale and amended his team's batting order.

Wyatt played his last Test against Australia at the Melbourne Cricket Ground in 1937. In his test career, he scored 1,839 runs at an average of 31.70 and took 18 wickets at an average of 35.66. In his first-class career he played 739 matches, scoring 39,405 runs at an average of 40.04, and taking 901 wickets at an average of 32.84. His highest innings in a test match was 149 against South Africa at Trent Bridge in 1935.

He captained Warwickshire from 1930 to 1937 when he was replaced by Peter Cranmer. Wyatt did not like the way this was handled, but he nevertheless continued to play for Warwickshire through the 1938 and 1939 seasons. He served in the Royal Air Force in World War II. After the war, he transferred to Worcestershire, where he said he had six happy summers. In his penultimate match in 1951, he faced the final ball of the game against Somerset at Taunton with Worcestershire needing six to win, and "he duly drove it high into the pavilion for victory".

He lived to be 93 years old and was England's oldest living Test cricketer before his death. He has a stand named after him at Warwickshire's home ground of Edgbaston. He was the cousin of politician and broadcaster Woodrow Wyatt.

Sporting positions
Preceded by Douglas Jardine	English national cricket captain 1933–1934/5	Succeeded by Gubby Allen
Preceded by Freddie Calthorpe	Warwickshire County Cricket Captain; 1930–1937	Succeeded by Peter Cranmer
Preceded by Allan White	Worcestershire County Cricket Captain; 1949–1951	Succeeded by Ronald Bird
Preceded by Bill Ponsford	Oldest Living Test Cricketer; 6 April 1991 – 20 April 1995	Succeeded by Jack Newman
