= Henry Coventry (cricketer) =

English cricketer and stockbroker

Personal information
- Full name: Henry Thomas Coventry
- Born: 3 May 1868; Regent's Park, London, England
- Died: 2 August 1934 (aged 66); Westminster, London, England
- Batting: Right-handed
- Bowling: Right-arm slow
- Relatives: Charles Coventry (brother); John Coventry (nephew)

Domestic team information
- Years: Team
- 1888: Marylebone Cricket Club

Career statistics
Competition	First-class
Matches	2
Runs scored	28
Batting average	7.00
100s/50s	–/–
Top score	15
Balls bowled	24
Wickets	1
Bowling average	12.00
5 wickets in innings	–
10 wickets in match	–
Best bowling	1/12
Catches/stumpings	–/–
- Source: Cricinfo, 28 April 2021

The Hon. Henry Thomas Coventry (3 May 1868 – 2 August 1934) was an English first-class cricketer.

The son of George Coventry, 9th Earl of Coventry he was born at Regents Park in May 1868. He was educated at Eton College, where he played for the cricket eleven, in addition to representing the college at rackets. From Eton he went up to New College, Oxford. Coventry played two first-class cricket matches for the Marylebone Cricket Club in 1888 while he was still studying at Oxford, playing twice against Oxford University at Oxford and Lord's. Described by Wisden as a "hard-hitting batsman", he scored 28 runs in his two matches with a highest score of 15. He also took a single wicket with his right-arm slow bowling. The Coventry family was associated with Worcestershire County Cricket Club in its early years, with Coventry playing minor matches for Worcestershire between 1886 and 1894, when the team was still regarded as a second-class county. Outside of cricket, he was a member of the Stock Exchange. He died at his Westminster home in August 1934. His brother, Charles, played Test cricket for England, while his nephew John Coventry was also a first-class cricketer.
