= Perks =

Perks may refer to:

== People ==
- Perks (surname)

== Other uses ==
- Perks baronets, an extinct title in the Baronetage of the United Kingdom
- Perks, Illinois, United States, an unincorporated community
- Perks Matriculation Higher Secondary School, India
- Polly Perks, a character in the Discworld fantasy universe

== See also ==
- Perk (disambiguation)
