= Christopher Foster (cricketer) =

English cricketer

Personal information
- Full name: Christopher Knollys Foster
- Born: 27 September 1904; Herefordshire, England
- Died: 4 December 1971 (aged 67); Hereford, England
- Batting: Right-handed

Domestic team information
- Years: Team
- 1927: Worcestershire
- First-class debut: 1 June 1927 Worcestershire v Middlesex
- Last First-class: 11 June 1927 Worcestershire v Somerset

Career statistics
| Competition | First-class |
|---|---|
| Matches | 3 |
| Runs scored | 34 |
| Batting average | 11.33 |
| 100s/50s | 0/0 |
| Top score | 16* |
| Catches/stumpings | 0/0 |
- Source: CricketArchive, 4 January 2008

Christopher Knollys Foster (27 September 1904 – 4 December 1971) was an English cricketer. A right-handed batsman, he played first-class cricket for Worcestershire in 1927.

== Biography ==
The son of Henry Foster, one of the Foster brothers that dominated Worcestershire cricket in the early years of the 20th century, Christopher Foster was born in Herefordshire in 1904. In 1926, before making his first-class debut, he played two matches for the Marylebone Cricket Club (MCC) against Ireland in Belfast and Dublin.

He played three first-class matches in 1927, two County Championship matches against Middlesex and Somerset, and a match against New Zealand. He played a match for the Federated Malay States against the Straits Settlements in 1930.

He died in Hereford in 1971. His cousin John Greenstock played for Worcestershire and Oxford University and another cousin, Peter Foster, played for Oxford University and Kent.
