= Michael Singleton =

English cricketer (1913–2002)

George Michael Singleton CBE MC (12 May 1913 – 11 December 2002) was an English first-class cricketer who played in three matches, appearing once for Cambridge University and twice for Worcestershire. He took five wickets with his left-arm spin and scored 34 runs in his five innings. He later played for the Free Foresters and I Zingari.

Singleton was born in Repton, Derbyshire, where his father was a schoolmaster. In 1916, his father became headmaster of The Elms School in Colwall. Michael was the eldest of four brothers. Sandy Singleton was a county cricketer who became captain of Oxford and Worcestershire. John became a farmer in Scotland, and Tim Singleton became President of the Law Society, and was knighted.

He was educated at Uppingham and Pembroke College, Cambridge, and became a teacher at West Down School near Winchester, before rejoining his father as a teacher at The Elms.

In 1939, he joined the army and formed a company of the Hereford Light Infantry. He was seconded to the King's Own Yorkshire Light Infantry, landing in France shortly after D-Day, where he won the MC. He was offered the opportunity to join the regular army in 1946, but returned to The Elms, where he succeeded his father as headmaster in 1948, remaining headmaster for 25 years, until 1973. He was also a local magistrate, High Sheriff of Hereford and Worcester, and a Deputy Lieutenant.

He married Diana Philpot in 1939, and they had five children. He died in Malvern at the age of 89.
