= Charles Tarbox =

English cricketer

Personal information
- Full name: Charles Victor Tarbox
- Born: 2 July 1891; Hemel Hempstead, Hertfordshire, England
- Died: 15 June 1978 (aged 86); Peacehaven, Sussex, England
- Nickname: Percy
- Batting: Right-handed
- Bowling: Right arm medium

Domestic team information
- Years: Team
- 1921—1929: Worcestershire

Career statistics
Competition	FC
Matches	226
Runs scored	5,819
Batting average	15.85
100s/50s	2/19
Top score	109
Balls bowled	24,306
Wickets	375
Bowling average	35.34
5 wickets in innings	11
10 wickets in match	1
Best bowling	7–55
Catches/stumpings	122/0
- Source: CricketArchive, 24 June 2008

Charles Victor Tarbox, sometimes known as "Percy" (2 July 1891 – 15 June 1978) was an English cricketer who played over 200 first-class games for Worcestershire in the 1920s. He also played at minor counties level for Hertfordshire, and later still stood as a first-class umpire in both England and South Africa. Tarbox's career statistics were fairly modest, but as his obituary in Wisden noted, he frequently chipped in with a few useful runs or wickets, valuable commodities for the generally weak Worcestershire sides of the day.

He achieved his best innings figures in his first season of 1921, in only the seventh match of his first-class career, when in June he claimed 7–55 against Somerset at Worcester. A few weeks later, and against the same opponents, he achieved what was to prove his only ten-wicket match haul, picking up 4–126 and then 6–32 in a big Worcestershire victory at Taunton. He ended 1921 with 629 runs at 17.97 and 47 wickets at 27.29.

Wisden said that Tarbox "never fulfilled the promise" of that first season. However, he continued to put in useful performances and was generally a regular in the team. His most productive seasons with the ball were 1927 and 1928, when he took 81 and 79 wickets respectively. As a batsman, the highlights were the only two centuries of his career: 103 not out against local rivals Warwickshire at Edgbaston in May 1925, and 109 – in an innings in which the second highest score was 29 – against Nottinghamshire at Trent Bridge in July 1927.

The 1929 season was a poor one for Tarbox – he averaged under 12 with the bat and over 42 with the ball – and Worcestershire released him at the end of the summer. That was the end of his first-class playing career, but he returned to his home county of Hertfordshire and played for them for several years in the Minor Counties Championship; for them he scored relatively few runs but took many wickets, including 6–13 against Berkshire in July 1931.

After his last game for Hertfordshire in 1934, Tarbox became an umpire, and stood in over 150 English first-class games between 1936 and 1947. He then added another ten matches as an umpire in South Africa.
