= Pete's Eats Cafe =

Hotel and eatery in Llanberis, Gwynedd, Wales

Coordinates: 53.1215°N 4.1271°W

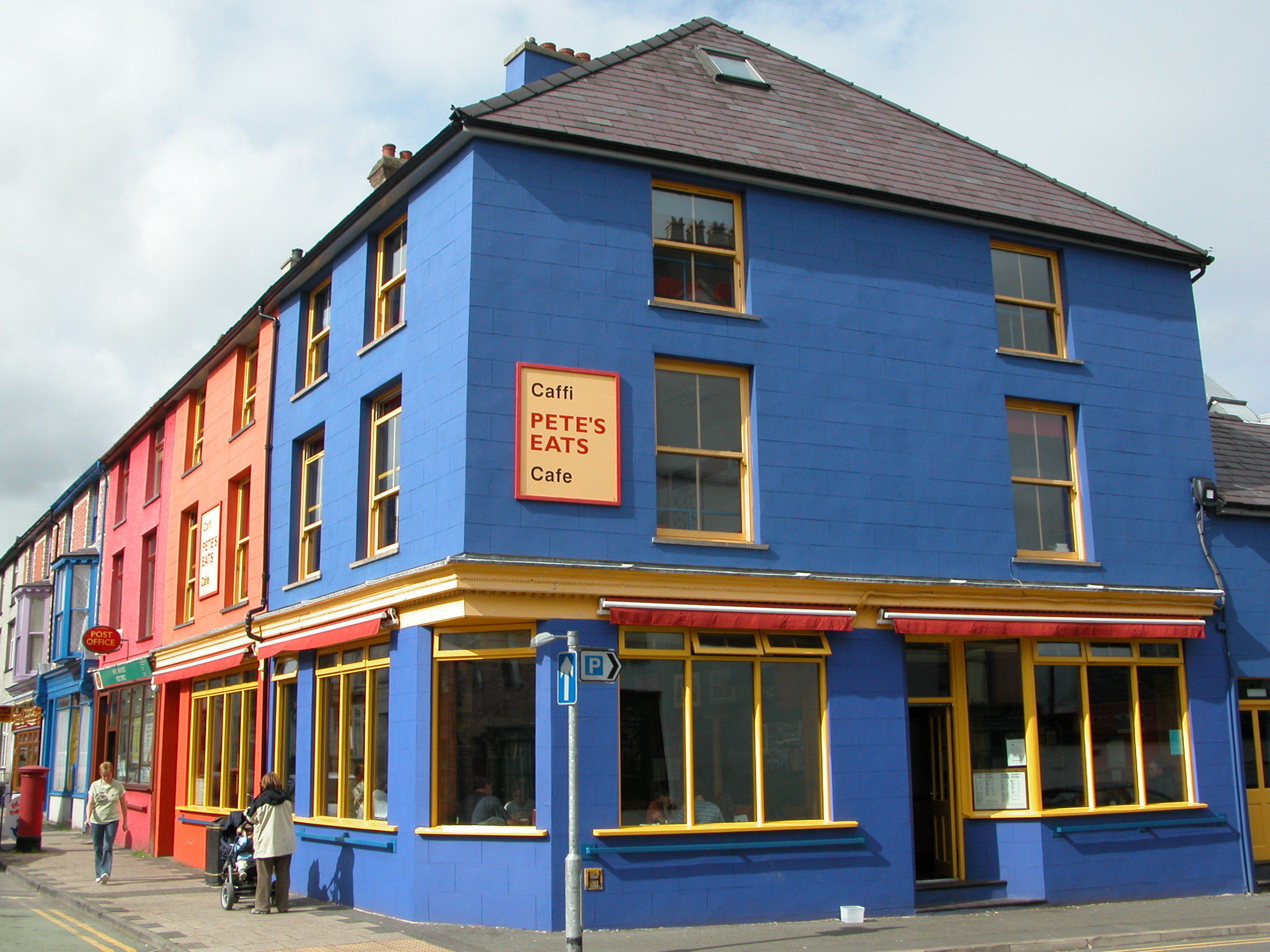
General view

Pete's Eats is a cafe in Llanberis, North Wales, popular amongst walkers and climbers in the Snowdonia region of mountains. Llanberis, at the foot of Snowdon, is one of the traditional starting points for climbs in the Snowdonia National Park. The cafe has long been an important centre for climbers, described as "one of the most famous mountaineering hangouts in Britain". It even received a small mention in the New York Times as "cheap and filling" and "rowdy fun".

Pete's Eats closed for the winter in September 2022 and, after refurbishment, re-opened in November 2025.

== History ==
Pete's Eats opened in August 1978, taking its name from Peter Norton, its proprietor.

The building was refurbished in 2002, taking over the adjoining building to create much-needed space downstairs and adding a hotel, showers, and library.

== See also ==
- Jimmy Jewell (climber)
