= John Jewell (Worcestershire cricketer) =

John Mark Herbert Jewell (Bloemfontein, South Africa, 3 May 1917 – Durban, South Africa, 29 October 1946) was an English first-class cricketer played for Worcestershire in two matches in the 1939 season.

A right-handed middle-order batsman, Jewell played in the first first-class match of the West Indies tour, scoring 4 and 24 and taking two catches as Worcestershire won the match inside two days. His only other first-class game was the Whitsuntide match against Essex at Chelmsford in the middle of which the Worcestershire opening batsman Charlie Bull was killed in a car crash and the wicketkeeper Syd Buller was severely injured. Worcestershire's two innings in the match both came after the tragedy, and were unsurprisingly unsuccessful; Jewell scored 2 and 0, and did not play first-class cricket again.

Jewell appears in Wisden Cricketers' Almanack's reports of the first-class matches as "P-O. M. Jewell", reflecting that he was at this stage a pilot officer in the Royal Air Force, which he joined in 1938. He appeared for the RAF's cricket team in 1939 in two non-first-class matches against the Royal Navy at Lord's and against the Army at Uxbridge. In the Lord's match he opened the innings and made 1 and 44. Against the Army, he made a duck in the first innings, but in the second he "hit brilliantly" to make an unbeaten 92 "in about an hour", taking his side to victory.

Jewell served in the RAF throughout the Second World War, ending with the rank of squadron-leader and being awarded the MBE. He was a prisoner of war for two years.

He was the son of the Orange Free State cricketer John Jewell and the nephew of the Worcestershire players Maurice Jewell and Arthur Jewell.
