= Catharine Newsome Jewell =

American opera singer (1869–1936)

Catherine Newsome Jewell
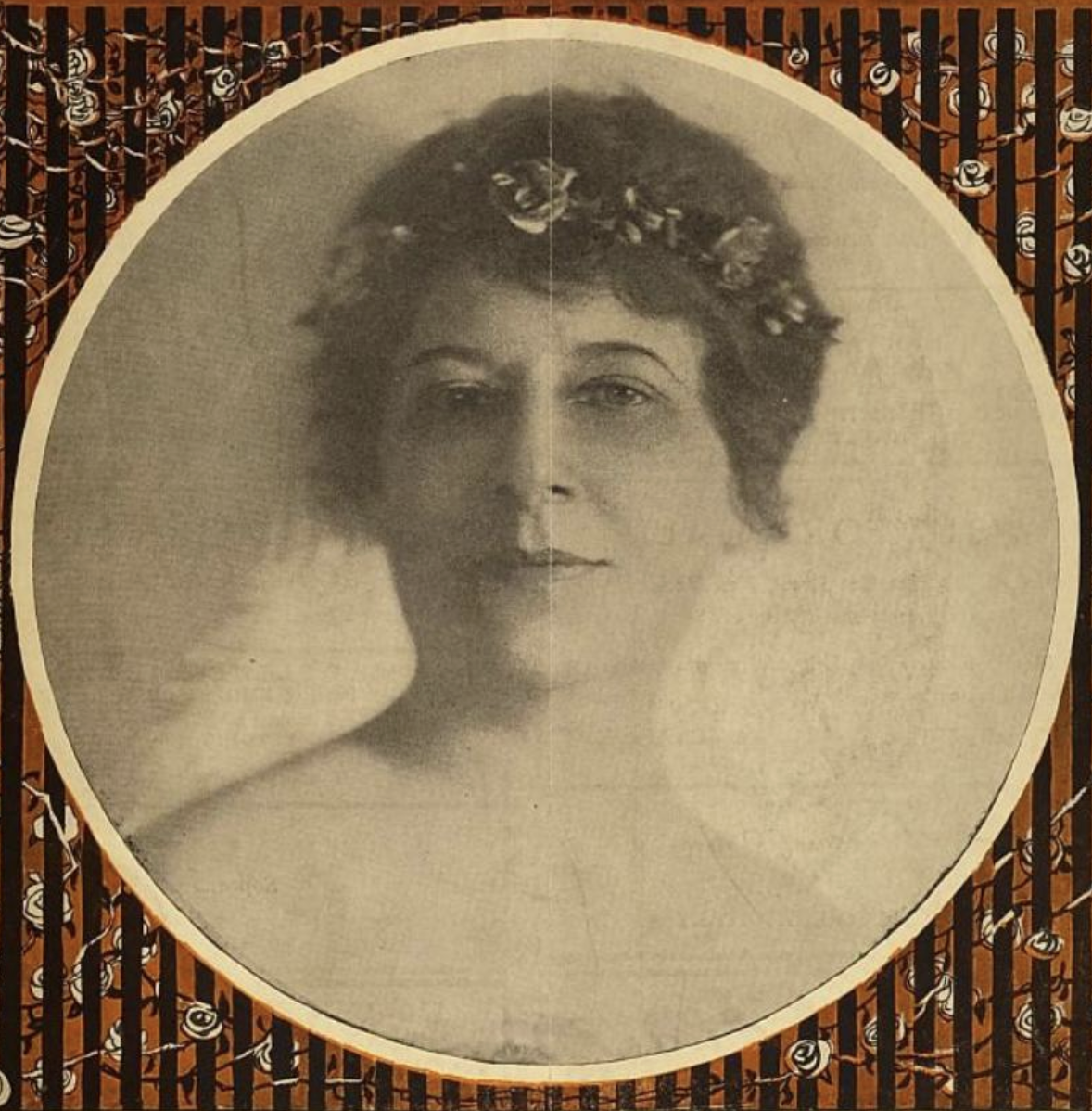
- Jewell on the cover of Musical Advance, December 1924
- Born: 1868 or 1869
- Died: 16 July 1936; Venice, California
- Occupations: Operatic soprano; voice teacher

Catharine Newsome Jewell (1868/9–1936) was an American soprano and voice teacher. Decorated on several occasions by the Italian government for her charity work for children who were victims of World War I, she had one of the largest collections of medals and ribbons possessed by any musical artist of her era. After a twelve-year singing career in Europe, she returned to the U.S. for an extensive tour. An authority on bel canto, she later became a voice professor in Kansas and South Carolina before moving to Los Angeles, where she continued teaching.

== Early life and education ==
Catharine (or Catherine) Newsome was born in 1868 or 1869.

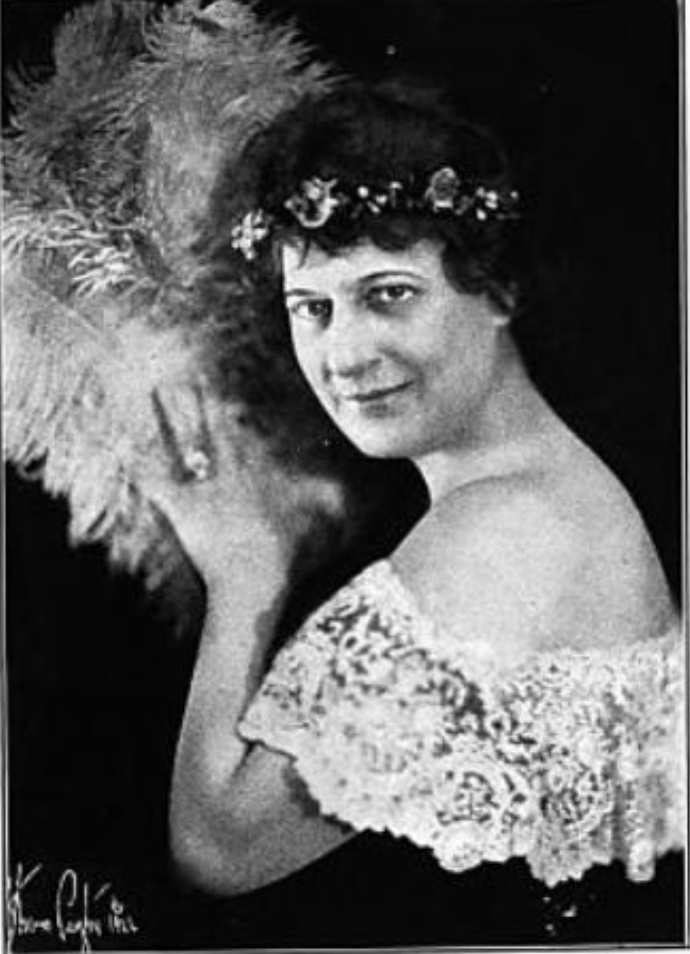
Jewell in 1924

She belonged to the school of celebrità, with the experience of studying under the great singing masters of her era both in the U.S. and Europe, including Franz Xavier Arens, Marcel Chadeigne, Marcelle Demougeot, Herman Devries, Emma Nevada, Jean de Reszke, Tullio Serafin, and Maria Laura Vimercati of Milan.

== Career ==
Jewell's singing career in Europe lasted for 12 years.

Returning to the U.S., she appeared in an extensive tour of concerts and recitals. In 1904, she toured with the Ben-Hur Opera Company. In 1906, she was performing in Columbus, Georgia, having left the Ben-Hur Opera Company, and in 1908, it was reported that she was teaching singing at the Brenan Conservatory in Gainesville, Georgia.

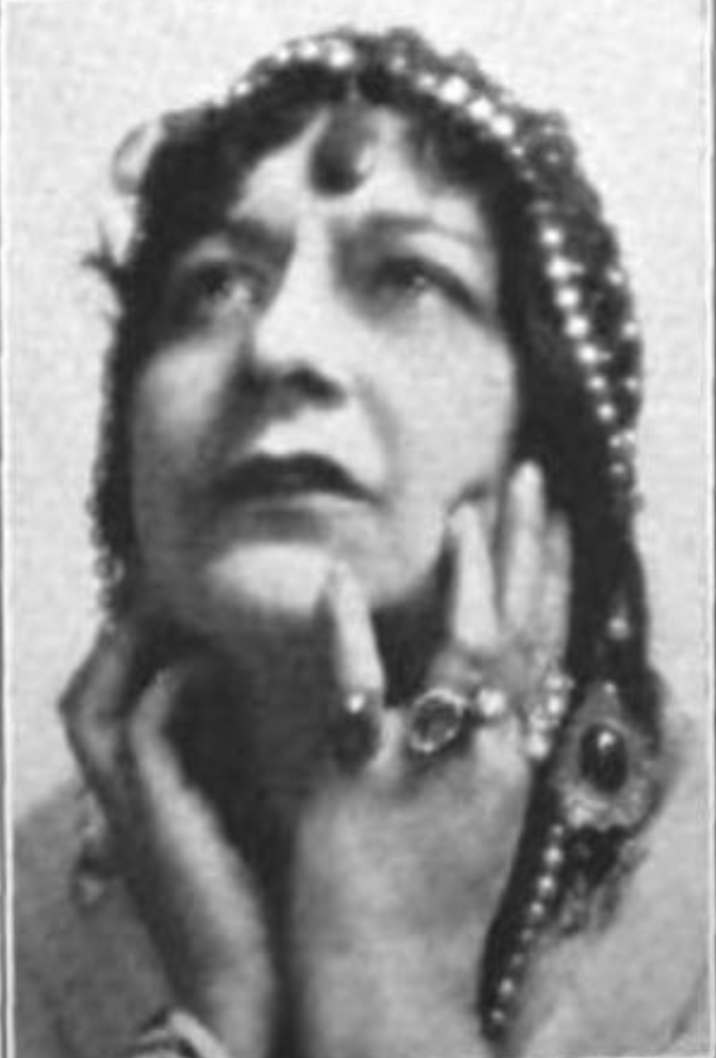
Jewell in costume in 1929

The Musical Courier reported in 1908 that Jewell had left Paris for Florence, where she was expected to stay for a long period. In Italy, she did a great deal of charity work on behalf of children and orphans who were victims of World War I; she was decorated on several occasions by the Italian government for her efforts in this and similar causes, and for distinguished service in the Italian Red Cross.

After the war, she returned to the U.S. and in 1921, she opened a studio in Kansas City, Kansas. Later in the decade, Jewell served as professor of voice at Converse College, Spartanburg, South Carolina. She returned to New York City in January 1925 to sing at the Town Hall for the benefit of a fresh-air home at Sestola, Italy, for children from Bologna, Padua, and Parma. The New York Times reviewed that performance.

"Jewell's singing, despite nervous uncertainties of pitch, was marked by refinement and mature sympathy".

In the following year, a review of Jeewll appeared in the February issue of Musical Advance.

"Jewell has a voice of good texture that suffers from faulty breathing, capricious pitch, and a poor sense of rhythm."

By 1928, Jewell had removed to Los Angeles, where she was affiliated with the Motion Picture Extra Girls' Frolic. She lived in the Waldorf Hotel in Venice, California; her studio was located in the Beaux Arts Building, Los Angeles. Having spent twenty years in the musical life of Europe as student and a prima donna, and being an authority and devotee of bel canto, she was equipped to give pupils the discipline and schooling obtained by study with European masters.

== Death ==
Jewell died in Venice, California on July 16, 1936, a victim of a car accident.

== Awards and honors ==
Jewell had one of the largest collections of medals, ribbons and other decorations possessed by any musical artist of her era.
