= Thomas Perks =

English cricketer

Thomas Perks (2 October 1883 – 15 January 1953) was an English cricketer who played one first-class match, for Marylebone Cricket Club (MCC) against London County at Crystal Palace Park in August 1902. In an innings defeat for MCC, Perks claimed three stumpings and one catch, although John Whiteside (who stumped one further man) was listed as MCC's wicket-keeper on the scorecard.

Perks was born in Worcester; he died in Ledbury, Herefordshire at the age of 69.

His son, Reg Perks, had a far more substantial career, playing nearly 600 first-class matches including two Tests and playing for Worcestershire for more than two decades.
