= William Taylor (Worcestershire cricketer) =

English cricketer

William Herbert Taylor (23 June 1885 – 27 May 1959) was an English first-class cricketer. He was a right-handed batsman and right-arm fast-medium bowler who played 107 times for Worcestershire between 1909 and 1925, captaining the county in 1914, 1919 and 1922. He also made three first-class appearances for HK Foster's XI.

Born in Sale, Cheshire, Taylor made his debut in Worcestershire's County Championship game against Kent on 14 June 1909, making 19 and 0. He did not bowl in that game; his first wicket was that of Harry Altham in Worcestershire's next game, against Oxford University. For the next few years, with the exception of 1910 when he made 11 appearances, Taylor played only a few times a season.

He was made captain in 1914, replacing Henry Foster, and appeared in 21 matches. He scored what was to be his career best of 59 not out against Essex in August of that year, and took 26 wickets at 44.69. The First World War then intervened, but on the resumption of first-class cricket in 1919, Taylor continued as captain. Worcestershire did not participate in the County Championship that summer but instead played a series of friendly matches; it was in one of these, against HK Foster's XI, that he took his first five-wicket innings haul, claiming 5–56.

For 1920, and Worcestershire's return to Championship cricket, Taylor was replaced as captain by his brother-in-law, Maurice Jewell, but Taylor continued to play a significant number of matches for the county. 1921 was the most productive season of his career, as he took 35 wickets at 28.28 including five in an innings three times; the best of these being his career-best of 7–64 against Glamorgan at Kidderminster.

Taylor regained the captaincy for 1922, but had a wretched season: despite playing 17 games, he could manage a mere four wickets costing over 131 runs apiece, to go with 214 runs at 8.23. Maurice Foster took over the reins for 1923, and it was almost the end for Taylor as a first-class player: after 1922 he played only one more first-class match—though he captained Worcestershire in that game too—against Oxford University in 1925. He made 1 and 0 and took 2–79 in the second innings.

He died in Birlingham, Worcestershire at the age of 73.

Sporting positions
Preceded by Harry Foster	Worcestershire County Cricket Captain; 1914–1919	Succeeded by Maurice Jewell
Preceded by Maurice Jewell	Worcestershire County Cricket Captain; 1922	Succeeded by Maurice Foster
