= John Higgins (cricketer) =

English cricketer and umpire

Personal information
- Full name: John Bernard Higgins
- Born: 31 December 1885; Harborne, Birmingham, England
- Died: 3 January 1970 (aged 84); Malvern, Worcestershire, England
- Batting: Right-handed
- Bowling: Slow left arm orthodox

Domestic team information
- Years: Team
- 1912–1930: Worcestershire
- 1922/23–1928/29: Europeans (India)
- FC debut: 10 June 1912 Worcestershire v Leicestershire
- Last FC: 27 May 1930 Worcestershire v Gloucestershire

Career statistics
Competition	First-class
Matches	121
Runs scored	4,149
Batting average	19.57
100s/50s	3/11
Top score	123
Balls bowled	2,824
Wickets	30
Bowling average	53.46
5 wickets in innings	1
10 wickets in match	0
Best bowling	5/72
Catches/stumpings	59/–
- Source: CricketArchive, 18 September 2007

John Bernard Higgins (31 December 1885 – 3 January 1970) was an English first-class cricketer and umpire. As a player, he made 121 appearances between 1912 and 1930, having earlier played in the Minor Counties Championship for Staffordshire. The great majority of his first-class matches were for Worcestershire, though he also played in India for the Europeans and, once, a joint "Europeans and Parsees" side. He umpired four first-class games, including one Test match.

Higgins was educated at King Edward's School, Birmingham, where he was in the cricket XI. In his teens and early twenties, Higgins played football as an inside left. He appeared once in the Football League First Division for Birmingham in the 1907–08 season, and was also on the books of Aston Villa and Brierley Hill Alliance, retaining his amateur status throughout his football career.

He made his first-class cricket debut for Worcestershire against Leicestershire at Amblecote in 1912. Only one day's play was possible in the match, during which Higgins scored 5 and bowled five wicketless overs for 34. It was to be eight years before he played first-class cricket again.

His next game for Worcestershire came against Yorkshire at Worcester in 1920, on which occasion he again had an unproductive match: he scored 1 and 0, and took no wickets in 16 overs. Higgins finally claimed his first wicket – Kent opener Wally Hardinge, caught and bowled – in his fifth first-class game, at Tonbridge a few days later, and he ended the season with unattractive figures of 85 runs at 7.72 and four wickets at 88.25.

Higgins played not at all in 1921, but in 1922 he had a considerably more successful time of it, scoring 605 runs at 16.35 – albeit with only one fifty – and taking 14 wickets, his highest season's aggregate, at 44.07. This year also saw him claim his only five-wicket haul, 5–72 against Gloucestershire at Gloucester, restricting the home team to 202 in their first innings. His performance was to no avail, however: Worcestershire were bowled out for 58 and 52, Mills and Parker bowling unchanged throughout the match, and lost by an innings.

Higgins was in India during the 1922–23 English winter, playing four first-class games including two for Europeans in the Lahore Tournament. He was to make further Indian appearances, five of them in the Bombay Quadrangular, in 1923–24, 1924–25 and 1928–29, though he hit only one fifty (56 for Europeans against Parsees in 1923–24) and took just two wickets in his entire career of ten matches in that country.

Meanwhile, Higgins' English career was barely noticeable: he played twice in each of the 1924 and 1925 seasons, and not at all in 1926. The next three years, however, were to prove by some margin his most successful in the game. He played 19 or 20 matches for Worcestershire every summer, and hit one century in each, the highest of these being the first: 123 against Glamorgan at Kidderminster in July 1927. He scored those runs from number three in the order, but his other two centuries were both made as an opener. In 1928 he reached 1,000 first-class runs in a season for the only time, hitting 1,041 at an average of 30.61.

Higgins played three final matches for Worcestershire in 1930, without conspicuous success. By this time he had already umpired two first-class games in India in 1926–27, and in 1933–34 he stood in two more, including the third Test between India and England at Madras. He died in England, in a nursing home in Malvern, aged 84.

His younger brother Harry played nearly 100 times for Worcestershire in the 1920s.
