= James Jewell =

Jimmy or James Jewell may refer to:

- James A. Jewell (c.1840–1912), American public official on Board of General Appraisers
- James Jewell (politician) (1869–1949), Australian Labor Party member of Victorian Legislative Assembly
- Jimmy Jewell (association football) (1898–1952), English football manager and referee
- James Jewell (director) (1906–1975), American radio director, producer and actor in Detroit
- Jimmy Jewell (saxophonist) (born 1945).
- Jimmy Jewell (climber) (1953–1987), British solo rock climber who fell during descent

== See also ==
- James Francis Jewell Archibald (1871–1934), American war correspondent in Spanish–American War and World War I
- Jimmy Jewel (1909–1995), English comedian and actor in stage, radio, television and film
- Jewell James Ebers (1921–1959), American electrical engineer (Ebers-Moll model)
