= R. E. Foster =

English cricketer

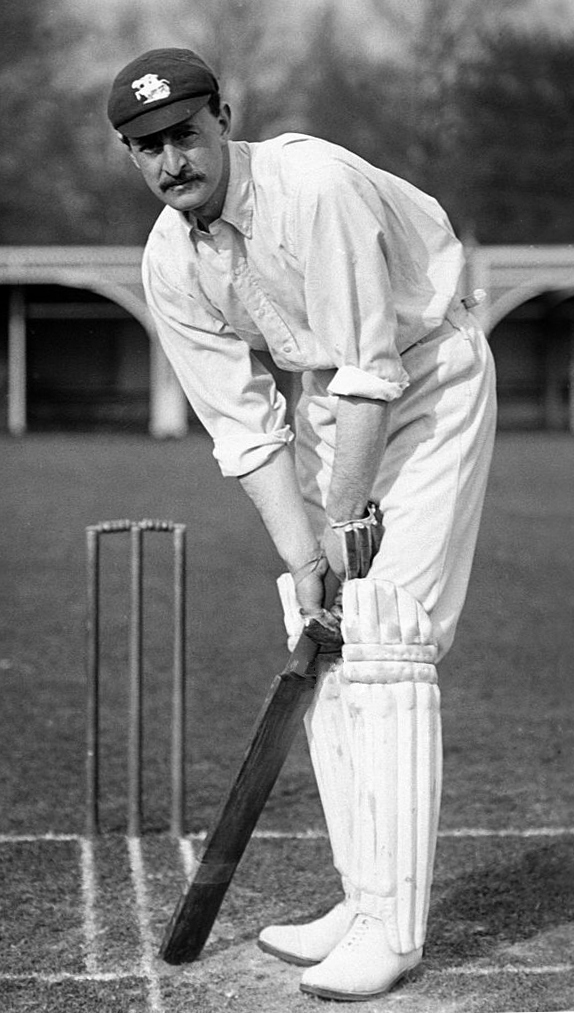

Personal information
- Full name: Reginald Erskine Foster
- Born: 16 April 1878; Malvern, Worcestershire, England
- Died: 13 May 1914 (aged 36); Brompton, London, England
- Nickname: Tip
- Batting: Right-handed
- Bowling: Right arm fast

International information
- National side: England
- Test debut (cap 138): 11 December 1903 v Australia
- Last Test: 19 August 1907 v South Africa

Domestic team information
- Years: Team
- 1899–1912: Worcestershire
- 1897–1900: Oxford University

Career statistics
Competition	Tests	First-class
Matches	8	139
Runs scored	602	9,076
Batting average	46.30	41.82
100s/50s	1/1	22/41
Top score	287	287
Balls bowled	0	1,616
Wickets	–	25
Bowling average	–	46.12
5 wickets in innings	–	0
10 wickets in match	–	0
Best bowling	–	3/54
Catches/stumpings	13/–	178/–
- Source: Cricinfo, 11 November 2008

Reginald Erskine Foster (16 April 1878 – 13 May 1914), nicknamed Tip Foster, commonly designated R. E. Foster in sporting literature, was an English first-class cricketer and footballer. He is the only man to have captained England at both sports.

One of seven Foster brothers who were all educated at Malvern College and who all played cricket for Malvern and for Worcestershire, Foster was a right-handed middle-order batsman. In 1903 he scored 287 on Test debut, setting a world record for the highest Test score.

== Cricket career ==
Foster was educated at Malvern College and University College, Oxford. He first played for Oxford University Cricket Club in 1897; in addition to cricket, he also represented Oxford at football, racquets and golf. However, although he did fairly well, it was not until 1899 that his beautiful and immaculate driving to the off-side made him into one of the finest batsmen of his time. He first played for Worcestershire while they were still a minor county but against Hampshire in 1899, their inaugural season as a first-class county, he and his brother Wilfrid Foster both scored two hundreds in a match, a feat which remains unique in county cricket. In 1900, as captain of Oxford, he scored 171 to set the record for the highest individual score in the Varsity Match, and he scored 102 not out and 136 for the Gentlemen against the Players at Lord's, the first man to score two centuries in a match in that series. In total, Foster scored 930 runs at an average of 77.5 for Oxford in the 1900 season, a record in University cricket.

For these performances, Foster was named a Wisden Cricketer of the Year in 1901 and the following year a superb run of form for Worcestershire resulted in him scoring 1,957 runs at an average of 54.36. However, business prevented him representing the MCC in Australia the following winter and England undoubtedly missed his brilliant batting. Moreover, apart from one match against Warwickshire, he could devote no time to first-class cricket in May and June 1902, again ruling him out of contention for an England place against Australia.

In 1903, his appearances were restricted to three matches in June and August, but England were desperate for a captain for that winter's Ashes tour. Foster was (oddly) able to arrange to be away from England. Although one might have feared that he would be out of practice, in the first Test at Sydney in 1903, Foster scored 287. This was the highest score in Test cricket until 1930 (surpassed by Andy Sandham), and remains the highest score by a debutant and the third highest by a batsman of any nationality against Australia, home or away. (Note: surpassed only by Len Hutton's 364 in 1938 and Ross Taylor's 290 in 2015) For more than a century, Foster also held the record for the highest score in a Test match at the SCG, his score not being beaten until Australian Michael Clarke scored 329 not out against India in January 2012. Foster did not follow that up until the final Test on a vicious wicket at Melbourne, where he top-scored in both innings with 18 in a total of 61 all out and, having been promoted to open, an excellent 30 out of 101 all out.

In the following three seasons Foster could spare no time for cricket apart from August 1905, when he scored 246 on his first appearance, and two games in one week of August 1906, when he made one score of 198 against Somerset. However, in 1907 he was able to find time to play regularly from the beginning of June, and his batting was as good as ever in a summer of appalling wickets and helped Worcestershire – fourteenth of sixteen counties in 1906 – to rise to equal second with Yorkshire. He captained England in the three-match series against South Africa, winning one match and drawing two. Offered the captaincy of the MCC for the 1907/1908 Ashes tour, Foster declined because business commitments were monopolising his attention.

After the Third Test of 1907 he could spare time for only two more first-class matches, one in 1910 when he scored 133 against Yorkshire and one in 1912 against the Australians. However, in Saturday club cricket, he never lost his brilliance. In one club match in 1909 he scored 261 in just 75 minutes.

== Football career ==
In football, Foster played as a forward for the Corinthians in the early 1900s, scoring 22 goals in 26 matches. He also played for Old Malvernians, a team made up of former pupils of Malvern College.

He played five matches for England between 1900 and 1902, making his debut against Wales on 26 March 1900. In his second game, against Ireland at the Dell, Southampton, he scored his first international goal in a 3–0 victory. C. B. Fry played at full-back in the same game. Foster was awarded the captaincy against Wales in his final appearance on 3 March 1902, which ended in a 0–0 draw. During his short England career he scored two goals.

He also played one match for England Amateurs against Germany, on 21 September 1901, at White Hart Lane, London. He scored 6 (Note: One source gives 7) goals in a 12–0 win.

== Business career ==
Foster was a member of the stock exchange.

== Death ==
By 1913 it was clear Foster was suffering severely from diabetes. A trip to South Africa failed to help him recover and he died in May 1914 at the age of 36.

== Bibliography ==
- H S Altham, A History of Cricket, Volume 1 (to 1914), George Allen & Unwin, 1926

Sporting positions
Preceded by Harry Foster	Worcestershire County Cricket Captain; 1901	Succeeded by Harry Foster
Preceded by Pelham Warner	English national cricket captain 1907	Succeeded by Arthur Jones
Preceded by Ernest Needham	England football captain 1902	Succeeded by Frank Forman
Records
Preceded by Billy Murdoch	World Record – Highest individual score in Test cricket 287 vs Australia at Sydney 1903–04	Succeeded by Andy Sandham
