= Neville Foster =

English cricketer

Personal information
- Full name: Neville John Acland Foster
- Born: 28 September 1890; Malvern, Worcestershire, England
- Died: 8 January 1978 (aged 87); Malvern, Worcestershire, England
- Batting: Right-handed

Domestic team information
- Years: Team
- 1914–1923: Worcestershire
- First-class debut: 27 May 1914 Worcestershire v Middlesex
- Last First-class: 18 August 1923 Worcestershire v Sussex

Career statistics
Competition	First-class
Matches	8
Runs scored	219
Batting average	21.90
100s/50s	0/0
Top score	40*
Balls bowled	0
Wickets	–
Bowling average	–
5 wickets in innings	–
10 wickets in match	–
Best bowling	–
Catches/stumpings	5/0
- Source: CricketArchive, 30 December 2007

Neville John Acland Foster (1890–1978), generally known as Jonny, was an English cricketer. A right-handed batsman, he was the youngest of seven brothers to play first-class cricket for Worcestershire, though his county cricket was restricted to two seasons as he spent most of his life in Malaya.

== Biography ==
Born on 28 September 1890 in Malvern, Foster played twice for the Federated Malay States against the Straits Settlements in 1911 and 1912, he made his first-class debut for his native Worcestershire in May 1914 when he played in a County Championship match against Middlesex. He played in two further matches that season.

Back in Malaya, he played a third match for the Federated Malay States against the Straits Settlements in Kuala Lumpur in 1922, before returning to England for his final season of first-class cricket. He played five County Championship matches for Worcestershire that season, his availability restricted by a side injury. The remainder of his recorded cricket career took place in Malaya, eventually captaining the Federated Malay States for whom he played six more times, five times against the Straits Settlements and once against Hong Kong.

He also played three times for the combined Malaya cricket team, playing against Hong Kong in 1926, and against Hong Kong and Shanghai in 1927. He died on 8 January 1978 in Malvern, the last survivor of his cricket playing brothers. His wife's name was Ratana Yuok.
