= George Simpson-Hayward =

English cricketer

Cricket information
- Batting: Right-handed
- Bowling: Right-arm lob

International information
- National side: England
- Test debut: 1 January 1910 v South Africa
- Last Test: 11 March 1910 v South Africa

Career statistics
Competition	Test	First-class
Matches	5	200
Runs scored	105	5,556
Batting average	15.00	18.58
100s/50s	0/0	3/9
Top score	29*	130
Balls bowled	898	20,062
Wickets	23	503
Bowling average	18.26	21.39
5 wickets in innings	2	31
10 wickets in match	0	1
Best bowling	6/43	7/54
Catches/stumpings	1/–	133/–
- Source: CricInfo, 6 November 2022

George Hayward Thomas Simpson-Hayward (7 June 1875 – 2 October 1936) was an English cricketer who played in five Test matches in 1910 and took six wickets on debut in the first innings. He is notable for being the last serious exponent of underarm or lob bowling to appear regularly in first-class cricket.

Educated at Malvern College and Clare College, Cambridge, he played for Cambridge University (1895–97) and Worcestershire (1899–1914) where he was captain from 1911 to 1912. He played regularly throughout his cricketing career for which he was rewarded, aged 34, by being selected to play for the England national cricket team. He played throughout the five-Test series (1909–1910) in South Africa on matting pitches taking the first of his 23 wickets with his fifth ball. He bowled brisk off-breaks along a low trajectory with a leg-break action.

He was a Cambridge Blue at both cricket and football.

Sporting positions
Preceded by Harry Foster	Worcestershire County Cricket Captain; 1911–1912	Succeeded by Harry Foster
