= Jacob Jewell =

- Died: September 1884
- Resting place: West Ham Jewish Cemetery
- Occupation: Circus owner

Jacob Jewell (died September 1884) was the owner of the largest traveling circus in England. He was tenant, under William Holland, of North Woolwich Gardens for about fifteen years. Jewell was the only Jewish itinerant showman attending the English and Continental fairs for more than sixty years.
