= Allan White =

English cricketer

- White (R) and Don Bradman at Worcester in 1948

Cricket information
- Batting: Right-handed

Career statistics
Competition	First-class
Matches	142
Runs scored	5,035
Batting average	21.89
100s/50s	0/26
Top score	95
Catches/stumpings	46/–
- Source: Cricinfo, 7 November 2022

Allan Frederick Tinsdale White (5 September 1915 – 16 March 1993) was an English amateur first-class cricketer. He was a right-handed batsman who played for both Warwickshire and Worcestershire, captaining the latter county between 1947 and 1949, though sharing the captaincy with Bob Wyatt in the last of those three seasons. He also played for Cambridge University, as well as making a single appearance for Free Foresters. He passed fifty 26 times without ever going on to score a century.

== Early life and education ==
Born in Earlsdon, Coventry, White was educated at Uppingham School before going up to Pembroke College, Cambridge. He made his first-class debut for Cambridge University against Sussex in May 1936, scoring 93 (which was to remain his highest score for the university) before being out lbw to the bowling of Charles Oakes. He won his blue that season, playing in the Varsity Match at Lord's where he made 19 and 5. He also played six games for Warwickshire in the County Championship, often getting a good start though never going on to a big score, and finishing with 272 runs at an average of 30.22, placing him third in the county's averages.

== County cricket career ==
In 1937 White continued to play for Cambridge, although without winning another blue. He also made a further two appearances for Warwickshire, although his four innings totalled just 14 runs. He was then out of first-class cricket for a while before moving to Worcestershire in 1939, and although his record was mediocre (386 runs at 13.78, with a top score of only 47) he was kept on by the county when cricket resumed after World War II, enjoying his most successful season in 1946 with 1,179 first-class runs and a career-best 95 against the Combined Services.

In 1947 White was made Captain of Worcestershire. This proved to be a good choice – his obituary in Wisden called him "a popular and enterprising leader" – and he again passed a thousand runs for the season, albeit from 54 innings, the most he was ever to play in a single summer.

From 1948 onwards his attentions were increasingly taken up by his off-field responsibilities as a mushroom farmer and after a final season for Worcestershire in 1949 (a successful year in which they came third in the County Championship), he retired from first-class cricket. However, he played on for several years afterwards, representing the county's Second XI.

== Death ==
White died in Worcester at the age of 77.

Sporting positions
Preceded by Sandy Singleton	Worcestershire County Cricket Captain; 1947–1949	Succeeded by Bob Wyatt
