= John Greenstock =

English cricketer

John Wilfrid Greenstock
Personal information
- Born: 15 May 1905; Great Malvern, Worcestershire, England
- Died: 6 February 1992 (aged 86); Gloucester, Gloucestershire, England
- Batting: Right-handed
- Bowling: Slow left arm orthodox

Career statistics
Competition	First-class
Matches	46
Runs scored	507
Batting average	9.38
100s/50s	0/0
Top score	43
Balls bowled	7,179
Wickets	139
Bowling average	26.34
5 wickets in innings	4
10 wickets in match	0
Best bowling	5/36
Catches/stumpings	31/–
- Source: CricketArchive, 8 November 2022

John Wilfrid Greenstock (15 May 1905 – 6 February 1992) was an English first-class cricketer who played in 46 matches in the 1920s, the bulk of these for Oxford University and Worcestershire.

Greenstock made his first-class debut for Worcestershire against Northamptonshire at Worcester in August 1924, but was not called upon to bowl a single ball. He played one further match that summer, against Somerset, and this time claimed 4-69 including the wicket of Jack White, but Worcestershire were nevertheless heavily defeated.

From 1925 to 1927, Greenstock played mostly for Oxford, winning a Blue in all three years. In 1926 he played no county cricket, but he did turn out for Worcestershire a few times in 1925 and 1927. It was during this period that he achieved career-bests both in bowling (5-36 for against the Army at The University Parks in June 1926) and in batting (43 against Essex at Chelmsford in June 1927); both these feats were performed for Oxford.

After that, Greenstock played only two more first-class matches, for Free Foresters against Oxford in 1928, and for H. D. G. Leveson-Gower's XI against Cambridge University the following year. He bowled only seven overs in that final match, taking the single wicket of William Harbison.

Greenstock was born in Great Malvern, Worcestershire; he died in a Gloucester hospital at the age of 86.

He was the nephew of the seven Foster brothers, all of whom played first-class cricket for Worcestershire. Like them, he was also educated at Malvern College but he did not show great potential at cricket there. His cousin Peter Foster played for Oxford and Kent, while another cousin (Christopher Foster) and his father William Greenstock also had short first-class careers.
