= Perc Horner =

Australian rules footballer

Personal information
- Full name: Perc Horner
- Born: 8 January 1913
- Died: 29 January 2001 (aged 88)
- Original team: South Melbourne Districts
- Height: 179 cm (5 ft 10 in)
- Weight: 75 kg (165 lb)

Playing career^{1}
Years	Club	Games (Goals)
1938	South Melbourne	1 (1)
- ^{1} Playing statistics correct to the end of 1938.

Perc Horner (8 January 1913 – 29 January 2001) was an Australian rules footballer who played with South Melbourne in the Victorian Football League (VFL).
