= August Perk =

German resistance member

August Perk (October 25, 1897, Lohne / Lingen, Germany; – May 12, 1945, Braunschweig, Germany) was a German Resistance fighter against National Socialism. His brief friendship with Erich Maria Remarque influenced Remarque's novel All Quiet on the Western Front.

== Biography ==
August Perk was born as the son of a merchant family based in Lohne (Wietmarschen), Germany. At the Age of 17 August Perk served as a soldier in World War I in Russia and France.

Erich Maria Remarque worked as a teacher in August Perk's hometown Lohne. Perk and Remarque had a brief friendship. Remarque described this time later in his novel The Road Back (1931). Perk told Remarque of his experiences in World War I and many of these stories appeared in Remarque's antiwar novel All Quiet on the Western Front.

Neue Osnabrücker Zeitung: Was August Perk Schreckliches als Soldat im Ersten Weltkrieg erlebte, hat der weltbekannte Schriftsteller Erich Maria Remarque (1898-1970) in seinem Buch „Im Westen nichts Neues“ verarbeitet. Das Werk wurde in über 50 Sprachen übersetzt und gilt mit geschätzten Verkaufszahlen zwischen 15 und 20 Millionen als eines der meistgelesenen Bücher in der ganzen Welt (The horror August Perk experienced as a Soldier in World War I, reprocessed the famous Writer Erich Maria Remarque (1898-1970) for his Book "All Quiet on the Western Front". The work was translated into over 50 languages and is regarded with estimated sales numbers between 15 and 20 million as one of the most widely read books in the world)

Perk's vocation Learnt as a Blacksmith- and Locksmith-Boss changed after a time of self-employment, when he moved over to Nordhorn (Germany), where he worked for the Textile Company "Rawe & Co.". In 1940 August Perk married Johanna Meyer, they had two children, Maria (1941) and Heinrich (1942–1965).

Early on there were serious conflicts between August Perk and the National Socialists. After a bodily injury, August Perk's parents sued the Nazi Perpetrators and won the Trial. In 1934 the new Nazi Rulers condemned the faithful Catholic August Perk for political reasons to six months imprisonment, which was repealed for retention. Years later (in Nordhorn), on April 14, 1943, the Gestapo arrested August Perk as a result of denunciation by neighbors and colleagues.

On August 11, 1943, August Perk was convicted by the Higher Regional Court in Hamm (Germany) to two years in prison camp for "undermining military morale". August Perk survived the inhuman imprisonment in the notorious Prison Camp Wolfenbüttel (Germany) after the Liberation by the Allies only a few days and died on May 12, 1945.

In addition to a political Debate, whether or not to be named a Street in Lohne as a remembrance to August Perk after his name: Neue Osnabrücker Zeitung: SPD lässt nicht locker: Straße nach August Perk benennen ("The Socialist Party demands: Street Name after August Perk"), there are several Memorial Places in Lohne and Nordhorn which also remembers of the Fate of August Perk, such as the Memorial to the Victims of the First and Second World War near Jenny Holzer's "Black Garden" in Nordhorn, Photographs at The Town Museum (Stadtmuseum) in Nordhorn and a Memorial-Stone (so-called "Stolperstein" or "Stumbling Block"), the small Copper Plaques, in the Pavement in Front of Houses of which the (mostly Jewish) Residents were murdered by the Nazis, mention the name, date of birth and place (mostly a concentration camp) and date of death. In many other German cities memorials also can be found. There are already many thousands of these plaques, and their number is still growing. The city of Nordhorn published a brochure and documentation of Gunter Demnig's Stolperstein in Nordhorn: "Mentioned by Name ... Stumbling Blocks in Nordhorn, Documentation of the City of Nordhorn".
