= Sandy Singleton =

English cricketer

Alexander Parkinson Singleton (5 August 1914 – 22 March 1999) was an English first-class cricketer. An all-rounder, he was a right-handed opening batsman and Right-arm orthodox spin bowler. He played for Worcestershire, captaining the side in 1946, and also captained Oxford University and Rhodesia. In all he scored 4,700 runs and took 240 wickets in first-class cricket.

Born in Repton, Derbyshire, Singleton attended Shrewsbury School, captaining the school cricket team. He then went to Oxford, and won a blue three times. In 1934 he claimed what was to remain his career-best innings return of 6–44 against HDG Leveson-Gower's XI at Reigate. He also made his Worcestershire debut in 1934, playing for both county and university for several seasons, and in the last of these (1937) he captained the university side and was selected by Marylebone Cricket Club (MCC) to tour Canada.

He then played for Worcestershire (as an amateur) and while teaching at Repton School. Singleton later recalled that in Worcestershire's match against the Australians in 1938 he just failed to hold on to a catch at leg slip that would have dismissed Bradman for nought: in the event he went on to score 258!

In Worcestershire's final game before the outbreak of war, Singleton made the first of his four centuries, hitting an unbeaten 102 against Nottinghamshire, and when county cricket resumed in 1946, Singleton was made captain of Worcestershire, and enjoyed the most productive summer of his career: he scored 1,773 runs in first-class cricket at an average of 34.09, as well as taking 43 wickets at 28.23. He made three centuries and ten half centuries, his best being 164 in a nine-wicket victory over Warwickshire in late June.

Whilst serving with the Royal Air Force in Rhodesia during the war, Singleton had met his wife Polly; they married in 1941 and had five children: three sons and two daughters. After the end of the 1946 English season they emigrated to Rhodesia permanently, and although he concentrated on farming, he played nine times for the Rhodesian side between 1946–47 and 1949–50, once again being appointed as captain.

After he had retired from playing, Singleton spent nearly twenty years (1964–1983) teaching at Peterhouse Boys' School in Marondera, and in 1985 he and his wife emigrated again, this time to Australia where they settled in Wagga Wagga. Singleton was not a fan of modern one-day cricket – what he called "the pyjama game" - and believed that it had had an adverse effect on Test cricket itself. He continued to follow cricket via television until he was afflicted with Alzheimer's disease, and died in Wagga Wagga at the age of 84.

Singleton also played league football. His brother Michael played three times for Worcestershire in 1946.

Sporting positions
Preceded by Charles Lyttelton (no cricket 1940–45)	Worcestershire County Cricket Captain; 1946	Succeeded by Allan White
