= Neue Osnabrücker Zeitung =

German daily newspaper

- Type: Daily newspaper
- Format: Broadsheet
- Publisher: Neue Osnabrücker Zeitung GmbH
- Editor-in-chief: Berthold Hamelmann
- Founded: 1967; 59 years ago
- Language: German
- Headquarters: Osnabrück
- Circulation: 156.214 (Print, 2018); 15,000 (Digital, 2018)
- Sister newspapers: Rheiderland Zeitung
- OCLC number: 723810043
- Website: www.noz.de

Neue Osnabrücker Zeitung (German pronunciation: [ˈnɔʏə ɔsnaˈbʁʏkɐ ˈtsaɪtʊŋ]; transl. "New Newspaper of Osnabrück"; also known as Neue OZ) is a regional daily newspaper published in Osnabrück, Germany.

== History and profile ==
Neue OZ was established in 1967 as a successor of Neue Tagespost. The daily is headquartered in Osnabrück and serves for the regions of Osnabrück and Emsland. The paper has seven regional editions.

Neue OZ is published in broadsheet format. Its publisher is Neue Osnabrücker Zeitung GmbH, which also publishes Rheiderland Zeitung. Berthold Hamelmann is the editor-in-chief of Neue OZ. The website of the daily was started in January 2000. It also provides a Facebook-like website to its readers.

== Circulation ==
The circulation of Neue OZ was 308,000 copies and had 820,000 readers in 2001. Its circulation was 296,228 copies in the first quarter of 2006. In 2008 the daily had 442,000 readers. The paper had a circulation of 165,393 copies from Mondays to Fridays in the first quarter of 2009. The website of Neue OZ had 22,525,000 monthly page views in 2011. In December 2013, the circulation of the paper was 160,000 copies. The same date its website had 3.83 million page views.
