= Peter Cranmer =

English cricket and rugby union player (1914–1994)

- Cranmer in 1947

Personal information
- Full name: Peter Cranmer
- Born: 10 September 1914; Acocks Green, Birmingham, England
- Died: 29 May 1994 (aged 79); Peacehaven, Sussex, England
- Batting: Right-handed
- Bowling: Right-arm medium-fast
- Role: Batsman

Domestic team information
- Years: Team
- 1934–1954: Warwickshire

Career statistics
Competition	First-class
Matches	175
Runs scored	5,853
Batting average	21.59
100s/50s	4/30
Top score	113
Balls bowled	1,984
Wickets	29
Bowling average	41.65
5 wickets in innings	1
10 wickets in match	0
Best bowling	7/52
Catches/stumpings	125/–
- Source: CricketArchive, 8 October 2022
- Born: Peter Cranmer
- School: St Edward's School, Oxford
- University: Christ Church, Oxford

Rugby union career
- Position: Centre three-quarter
Senior career
Years	Team	Apps	(Points)
- Moseley Rugby Football Club
International career
Years	Team	Apps	(Points)
1934–1938	England	16	(Tries (1); Pen (1); Drop (2))

Peter Cranmer (10 September 1914 – 29 May 1994) was an English sportsman who captained Warwickshire in first-class cricket and earlier in his career represented England at rugby union. After World War II he gave up on rugby and focused purely on cricket.

== Cricket ==
While primarily a specialist batsman, Cranmer was also a decent medium pace bowler. His highest score at first-class level was made for Warwickshire in his first year, an innings of 113 versus Northamptonshire at Edgbaston. Although he went to Christ Church, Oxford, he did not play cricket for the university side.

Cranmer, a Major, served with the military during the war and spent time in both Burma and Egypt. He ended up at India in 1944 and appeared in a cricket match for the Europeans team. Cranmer also performed particularly well with the ball in a first-class match for the Bengal Governor's XI when he took 7 for 52 against Services XI at Eden Gardens.

He had been appointed captain of Warwickshire in 1938 and remained in the role until 1947 before he retired, citing business commitments. One of his final innings as captain was in a match against the touring South Africans when he made 101 runs. Cranmer subsequently captained Warwickshire's second eleven in the 1960s and 1970s, playing his final season at the age of 57.

== Rugby ==
Cranmer played for Oxford University RFC in two Varsity Matches and made his debut for England at the age of 21 in 1934. He played for England from 1934 and 1938, earning 16 caps, and took part in their Triple Crown winning Home Nations Championship campaigns of 1934 and 1937. A centre three-quarter, he also captained his country twice in the 1938 season. In 1936 he was a member of the English team which defeated New Zealand for the first time and helped to set up Alexander Obolensky's famous tries. Cranmer had to decline an invitation to take part in the 1938 British Lions tour to South Africa because of his commitment as Warwickshire's cricket captain and although he took part in an England trial match in 1939, injury prevented him playing for the national team that season. He played in two wartime rugby internationals but that marked the end of his high-level rugby career.

== Later life ==
After leaving cricket, Cranmer became a journalist and worked with BBC Midlands. He commentated on two Test Matches for Test Match Special, one in 1965 and one in 1968. Illness caused him to retire from his job in 1976 and he began to use a wheelchair when he had both legs amputated. He died in 1994 at his home town of Peacehaven, Sussex.

== Bibliography ==
- David Goodyear, 'Tiz All Accordin' – The Life of Peter Cranmer, Brewin Books, 2000, ISBN 1-85858-153-2.
