= Arthur Jewell =

English cricketer

Personal information
- Full name: Arthur North Jewell
- Born: 15 April 1888; Iquique, Chile
- Died: 8 September 1922 (aged 34); Selsey Sussex, England
- Batting: Right-handed
- Role: Wicket-keeper

Career statistics
Competition	FC
Matches	29
Runs scored	946
Batting average	16.89
100s/50s	3/1
Top score	128
Balls bowled	0
Wickets	0
Bowling average	–
5 wickets in innings	0
10 wickets in match	0
Best bowling	–
Catches/stumpings	20/11
- Source: CricketArchive, 5 May 2009

Major Arthur North Jewell (15 April 1888 – 8 September 1922) was an English cricketer who played 29 first-class matches between 1910–11 and 1920, mostly for Worcestershire.

== Early life and career ==
Although born in Chile, Jewell was educated in England, at Chigwell., and Felsted (1902–05)

Jewell first appeared in first-class cricket in South Africa, when he played five games for Orange Free State in the Currie Cup in the space of less than a fortnight in March 1911. He made his debut on the 11th against Transvaal; this match also saw the first-class debut of Arthur's brother John. Arthur, batting at three in each innings, made only 0 and 3 and claimed a single catch, to dismiss Maurice Luckin. His highest score that season was 34, made against Eastern Province in what proved to be his last appearance for eight years.

== After the First World War ==
In 1919 Jewell finally played first-class cricket again, when he opened the batting for Worcestershire against HK Foster's XI at Hereford, making 3 and 46; two days later he scored 19 and 0 for Foster's side in a friendly game against the Australian Imperial Forces. Against Somerset five days later still, he kept wicket for the first time, in place of Ernest Bale. In August of that year Jewell made the first (and highest) of his three centuries, hitting 128 for Worcestershire in another match against Foster's team.

1920 saw Jewell score another two hundreds, and enjoy his most successful summer behind the stumps with 21 victims, 13 of them caught and eight stumped. The Worcestershire side that year was captained by Arthur's brother Maurice. That season Arthur was also chosen for a Gentlemen v Players game at The Oval, in which he opened the batting for the Gentlemen as well as keeping wicket; he made 3 and 0 and held a single catch (to dismiss Patsy Hendren) in an innings defeat. For Worcestershire he played on until the end of the season, his final appearance coming in late August against Lancashire and his last dismissal, in that match, being that of Lancashire captain and former England Test player Jack Sharp.

Jewell played no more first-class cricket, and he died aged only 34 after a long illness.

== Relations ==
Three of Jewell's relatives played first-class cricket. Two brothers, John and Maurice, have already been mentioned in the text; the other was his nephew, also named John Jewell, who played twice for Worcestershire in 1939.
