= Ronald Bird =

English cricketer

Personal information
- Full name: Ronald Ernest Bird
- Born: 4 April 1915; Quarry Bank, Staffordshire, England
- Died: 20 February 1985 (aged 69); Feckenham, Worcestershire, England
- Batting: Right-handed
- Bowling: Right-arm fast-medium

Domestic team information
- Years: Team
- 1946–1954: Worcestershire
- 1953–1958: MCC
- FC debut: 4 May 1946 Worcestershire v Indians
- Last FC: 9 September 1958 MCC v Ireland

Career statistics
Competition	First-class
Matches	195
Runs scored	7,700
Batting average	26.10
100s/50s	7/38
Top score	158*
Balls bowled	1,745
Wickets	23
Bowling average	48.73
5 wickets in innings	0
10 wickets in match	0
Best bowling	3/26
Catches/stumpings	155/0
- Source: CricketArchive, 22 September 2007

Ronald Ernest Bird (4 April 1915 – 20 February 1985) was an English cricketer who played 195 first-class matches in the years after the Second World War. 190 of these were for Worcestershire, while the other five were for Marylebone Cricket Club (MCC). He captained Worcestershire between 1952 and 1954, though he had acted as such on many occasions during the previous two seasons when official captain Bob Wyatt was unavailable. He usually batted at number four, while his fast-medium bowling was of the occasional variety: he never took a season's tally of wickets into double figures.

Although Bird was on the groundstaff at Warwickshire as early as 1934, he never played for that county, and the intervention of the Second World War meant that he was 31 before he made his first-class debut. This was for Worcestershire against the touring Indians at Worcester in early May 1946. Bird's contribution to a narrow Worcestershire win was minimal: he scored 0 and 3, did not bowl, and held a single catch to dismiss Lala Amarnath.

Bird quickly established himself in the first team, and was capped that year, playing 24 times in all and ending the year with 801 runs at 20.53 including three half-centuries. Although he was only available for half Worcestershire's games in 1947, he nevertheless made his first century – 105 against Sussex in June – and passed fifty twice more. The following month he took his first wicket, against the same opponents, when he caught and bowled John Langridge.

He played only twice at first-class level in 1948, although he did turn out a few times for the Second XI in the Minor Counties Championship. In one of his two first-team matches, he took a career-best 3–26 against Northamptonshire in June. Bird returned for a full season the following summer, and passed a thousand runs for the first of three times, hitting 1,016 at 26.73 with one hundred – an innings of 116 which "had much to do" with a good win over Yorkshire — and five fifties.

1950 was rather a lean year for Bird, as in 38 innings his highest score was 68, but things improved in 1951, when he scored 129 against Essex and made seven further fifties. Appointed club captain for the 1952 season, he enjoyed the best summer of his career, scoring 1,591 first-class runs at exactly 37, and scoring three hundreds and eight fifties. The centuries included the highest of his career, an unbeaten 158 to help set up a two-day innings defeat of Somerset at Taunton in June.

The 1953 season was also quite successful for Bird, as he made 1,238 first-class runs at 26.91, with one hundred and five half-centuries. In late May of that year, he made his debut for Marylebone Cricket Club (MCC) at Lord's, captaining the side for the only time and opening the batting; he scored 68 and 40 in a losing cause against Hampshire. However, in 1954 he appeared only 20 times and made only 629 runs with three fifties, at an average of under 22. A defeat at Derby in mid-August, in which he scored 10 and 20 and took the wicket of John Kelly, marked the end of Bird's county cricket career.

All of his four remaining first-class matches were for MCC: two at Lord's (against Gloucestershire in June 1955 and against Cambridge University a year later) and two at Dublin in September 1956 and September 1958, both against Ireland. Bird's only significant contribution in any of these games was the 52 he hit in the first innings against Gloucestershire. He appeared a couple of times for the Second XI in 1959, then after leaving cricket represented Worcestershire at both squash and tennis.

== Notes ==
Sporting positions
Preceded by Bob Wyatt	Worcestershire County Cricket Captain; 1952–1954	Succeeded by Reg Perks
