= Geoffrey Foster =

English cricketer (1884–1971)

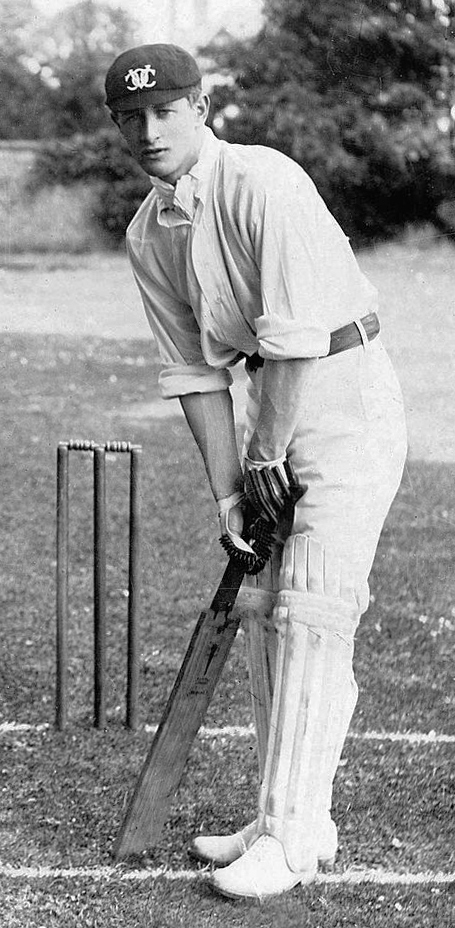
- Foster in about 1910

Personal information
- Full name: Geoffrey Norman Foster
- Born: 16 October 1884; Malvern, Worcestershire, England
- Died: 11 August 1971 (aged 86); Westminster, London, England
- Batting: Right-handed

Domestic team information
- Years: Team
- 1903–1914: Worcestershire
- 1905–1908: Oxford University
- 1921–1922: Kent

Career statistics
Competition	First-class
Matches	141
Runs scored	6,600
Batting average	28.32
100s/50s	11/26
Top score	175
Balls bowled	388
Wickets	8
Bowling average	35.50
5 wickets in innings	0
10 wickets in match	0
Best bowling	2/21
Catches/stumpings	160/1
- Source: ESPNcricinfo, 23 September 2018

Geoffrey Norman Foster (16 October 1884 – 11 August 1971) was an English first-class cricketer who played for Worcestershire and Kent County Cricket Clubs, as well as appearing a number of times for Oxford University and Marylebone Cricket Club (MCC). He was one of the seven Foster brothers, all of whom played first-class cricket for Worcestershire, and he led the county on a few occasions in the absence of the regular captain. He was a fast scorer, once making 101 in an hour for Oxford against Gentlemen of England.

== Early life ==
Foster was born at Malvern in Worcestershire in 1884, the fifth son of the Reverend Henry Foster and his wife Sophia. He, like all his brothers, was educated at Malvern College, where he was in the cricket eleven from 1902 and 1904. He made his first-class debut for Worcestershire against Leicestershire at New Road in August 1903, but made a duck in his only innings. He played a handful more matches in that and the following season, but his only achievement of note was an innings of 81 against Somerset in August 1905.

== Cricket ==
He went up to Worcester College, Oxford, in 1904 and was awarded a cricket Blue every year between 1905 and 1908. In 1905 he took the first of his few wickets, that of Gentlemen of England's Maynard Ashcroft. A fine all-round sportsman, Foster was also a Blue at golf and racquets, as well as captaining the university's association football team in 1908. Cricket was, however, his forté, and combining his appearances for Oxford with those for his county, he scored particularly heavily in 1907, when he hit 1,182 first-class runs, his best season's aggregate, at an average of over 40. He also passed a thousand runs in 1908.

In 1909–10 Foster went to India, playing twice for Europeans in the Bombay Presidency Match and Triangular, though his contribution was negligible: he totalled just three runs, held one catch and did not bowl. In 1910 he made his thousand runs for the third and last time when he played 19 first-class games and took 25 catches, both figures being his most in a single season. He appeared 17 times in 1911, but thereafter his business commitments limited his appearances to a handful each season. However, he did make a career-best 175 against Leicestershire in 1913, only to see Worcestershire fall to an eight-run defeat, despite Worcestershire having enforced the follow-on. His stand of 195 with John Cuffe in that match was at the time a county record for the sixth wicket. In 1912 he played (for the only time in his career) as wicket-keeper against the Australians at New Road, stumping the opposing keeper, Harold Webster.

The First World War intervened after the 1914 season, and Foster did not play again until 1920, when he appeared once each for Free Foresters and MCC, hitting 143 for MCC against Oxford University. In 1921 he played eight times for Kent, for whom he turned out twice more the following season. After that his first-class appearances were sporadic: he played for Harlequins in one of their few first-class matches, against the South Africans in 1924, and later that decade played four games for Free Foresters against Oxford University. Finally, he played a few games for MCC in 1931, the last being against – once again – Oxford.

== Later life ==
He was the Public Schools and Independent Schools F.A. representative on the Council of the Football Association from 1920 to 1924.

Foster died in Westminster, London at the age of 86.

== Bibliography ==
- Carlaw, Derek (2020). Kent County Cricketers, A to Z: Part Two (1919–1939) (PDF). Cardiff: ACS.
