= Peter Foster (cricketer) =

English cricketer (1916–1994)

Personal information
- Full name: Peter Geoffrey Foster
- Born: 9 October 1916; Beckenham, Kent
- Died: 7 December 1994 (aged 78); Southend-on-Sea, Essex
- Batting: Right-handed
- Bowling: Left-arm
- Role: Batsman
- Relatives: Geoffrey Foster (father)

Domestic team information
- Years: Team
- 1936–1938: Oxford University
- 1939–1946: Kent
- FC debut: 2 May 1936 Oxford University v Gloucestershire
- Last FC: 11 May 1946 Kent v Nottinghamshire

Career statistics
| Competition | First-class |
|---|---|
| Matches | 30 |
| Runs scored | 882 |
| Batting average | 18.37 |
| 100s/50s | 1/3 |
| Top score | 107* |
| Balls bowled | 8 |
| Wickets | 0 |
| Bowling average | – |
| 5 wickets in innings | – |
| 10 wickets in match | – |
| Best bowling | – |
| Catches/stumpings | 16/– |
- Source: Cricinfo, 30 December 2021

Peter Geoffrey Foster (9 October 1916 – 7 December 1994) was an English businessman and amateur cricketer. He played in 30 first-class cricket matches for Oxford University and Kent County Cricket Club between 1936 and 1946.

== Early life ==
Foster was born at Beckenham in Kent in 1916, the son of Geoffrey and Vera Foster. His father was a businessman who was serving in the East Riding Yeomanry at the time of Foster's birth. He had played cricket for Worcestershire and Kent and was one of seven brothers all of whom played first-class cricket for Worcestershire.

Foster was educated at Winchester College before going up to Christ Church, Oxford in 1935. He had played cricket at school, headed the Winchester batting averages in 1934 and played for the Public Schools at Lord's in 1935. During the same year he made his first appearance for Kent's Second XI.

== Cricket career ==
Foster made his first-class debut for Oxford in 1936, playing against Gloucestershire at The Parks. He played a total of five matches for Oxford, but did not win a Blue, and was unable to win a consistent place there, although he continued to play occasionally for Kent in the Minor Counties Championship. He also played racquets and golf for the university, winning Blues in both sports.

The majority of Foster's first-class cricket―a total of 24 matches―was played for Kent during the 1939 season. He played in almost all of the county's matches, scoring 725 runs at an average of 19.59. His only first-class century, a score of 107 not out, came against Leicestershire during the season, and he made half-centuries against Glamorgan and Nottinghamshire both of which were praised by Wisden.

Foster played club cricket such as Free Foresters, Harlequins, Southborough and Band of Brothers. He played in Kent's first County Championship match of 1946, but business commitments meant that he was not able to appear again for the county.

== War service and later life ==
Foster joined the Royal West Kent Regiment during World War II, before transferring to the Queen's Royal Regiment. He rose to the rank of Captain during the war.

Following the war, Foster worked on the London Stock Exchange. He was President of Kent County Cricket Club in 1991 and died following a heart attack in 1994 aged 78.

== Bibliography ==
- Carlaw, Derek (2020). Kent County Cricketers, A to Z: Part Two (1919–1939) (PDF). Cardiff: ACS.
