= John Jewell (South African cricketer) =

South African cricketer (1891–1966)

John Edmund Valentine Jewell (31 January 1891 – 17 April 1966) was a cricketer who played 27 times for Orange Free State (and once for PW Sherwell's XI) between 1910–11 and 1925–26. He also played a handful of times for Surrey's Second XI. In first-class cricket he scored 1,485 runs at 28.55, with a top score of 168 in 1920–21; and took 19 wickets at 32.26, with best innings figures of 5–56 achieved in 1922–23.

Jewell was born in Bexley, Kent, but spent most of his life in South Africa and died at Knysna, Cape Province at the age of 75.

He was the brother of Worcestershire captain Maurice Jewell, while another brother (Arthur) played for both Orange Free State and Worcestershire. John's son, also John, played twice for Worcestershire in 1939.
