= Jimmy Jewell (climber) =

British rock climber

Personal information
- Full name: Philip Jewell
- Nationality: British
- Born: 1953 South Wales
- Died: 31 October 1987 (aged 33–34) Tremadog

Climbing career
- Major ascents: The Axe E4 6a (solo, 1987), The Boldest Direct E3 (solo, 1987), Great Wall E4 6a (Second solo, 1987), Left Wall E2 5c (solo, 1987), Yankee Doodle E2 5b (solo, 1987)

Philip “Jimmy” Jewell (1953 – 31 October 1987) was a British rock climber and free soloist who was active during the 1970s and 1980s.

== Early life ==
Jewell was born in South Wales and spent much of his childhood in Ferndale, where he climbed in the quarries above the town. He moved with his family to Birmingham, England, while still a child. His father had worked in the South Wales Coalfield, but moved to Birmingham in search of better employment.

== Climbing ==
Jewell was a member of the Birmingham Cave and Crag Club. On first approaching the club he was taken to Llanberis by club members Graham Wales and Mick Moss. On that trip, he was taken up Direct at Dinas Mot. Eighteen months later he led Cenotaph Corner (E1 5c) at Dinas Cromlech. On 16 April 1978 he made the first ascent of The Flytrap (E3 5c) at Gogarth, along with Joe Brown and D. Cuthbertson.

Jewell featured in Total Control, a video of classic 1980s UK climbing made by Alun Hughes, a Welsh film-maker. Hughes filmed him climbing Left Wall (E2 5C) at Dinas Cromlech, and for the purposes of the film, Jewell free soloed the route six times, amounting to 800 ft of solo climbing.

A photograph taken by Paul Williams shortly before Jewell's death featured Jewell doing an early-morning free solo ascent of The Axe (E4 6a) at Clogwyn Du'r Arddu, in Snowdon. The photograph was reproduced as a poster and featured on the cover of the 1989 Clogwyn Du'r Arddu Guidebook.

The Climbers' Club Journal said of Jewell:

"In April 1987, starting at 12.30pm, he climbed five E2s and three E3s, about 1,000 metres of Extreme climbing plus the equivalent amount of descent, walked the five kilometres back to his car, and was back in Llanberis drinking tea in 'Pete's Eats' by 4.30! A few weeks later he was back, soloed The Boldest Direct (E3) on sight, and made the second solo of Great Wall (E4 6a) to warm up. He then astounded everyone by proceeding to solo the loose hanging arete of The Axe – E4 6a and one [of] the most exposed and 'out there' routes that can be imagined. Who can forget the magical photo on the cover of the Cloggy guidebook that remains a tribute to Jimmy?"

== Death ==
Jewell on Silly Arete (E3 5c), at Tremadog

Jewell died on 31 October 1987 while returning to his climbing club hut via a climb known as Poor Man's Peuterey (Severe) at Tremadog, North Wales. Soloing the route in sneakers, he slipped and fell to his death. He is buried at Bangor New Cemetery in North Wales.

== Recognition ==
The largest meal on offer at Pete's Eats, a climbing cafe in Llanberis, North Wales, is called a "Big Jim" in his honour. The meal came about after he asked for a "full breakfast", the staff misunderstood his Birmingham accent thinking he had asked for "four breakfasts". Jewell ate the resulting order.
