= Maurice Jewell =

English Cricketer

Personal information
- Full name: Maurice Frederick Stewart Jewell
- Born: 15 September 1885; Iquique, Chile
- Died: 28 May 1978 (aged 92); Whiteleaf, Buckinghamshire, England
- Batting: Right-handed
- Bowling: Slow left-arm orthodox
- Relatives: Arthur Jewell (brother); John Jewell (brother)

Domestic team information
- Years: Team
- 1909 to 1933: Worcestershire
- 1914 to 1919: Sussex

Career statistics
Competition	First-class
Matches	133
Runs scored	4118
Batting average	18.38
100s/50s	2/20
Top score	125
Balls bowled	6361
Wickets	104
Bowling average	33.15
5 wickets in innings	2
10 wickets in match	0
Best bowling	7/56
Catches/stumpings	68/0
- Source: Cricket Archive, 30 November 2014

Maurice Frederick Stewart Jewell, CBE (15 September 1885 – 28 May 1978) was a Chilean-born English first-class cricketer: a right-handed batsman and slow left arm bowler who played the bulk of his cricket for Worcestershire between the wars.

== Early life ==
Jewell was born in Iquique, Chile, where his father was the British Vice Consul and a councilor of the local municipality in 1879, after the end of the War of the Pacific. The family returned to England, and Maurice was educated at Marlborough College and agricultural college. His first-class debut came in 1909 for Worcestershire against Oxford University in a 12-a-side match; he batted at number ten and scored 10 not out and 4. With the exception of one outing for Surrey's seconds two years later, his next appearance was not to be until 1913, when he played for HK Foster's XI: again against Oxford University, and again in a 12-a-side game. In 1914, Jewell finally appeared in the County Championship; having a qualification, he appeared for Sussex.

He married Elsie Taylor, sister of his Worcestershire teammate William Taylor, in 1911. He served in the army during World War I, reaching the rank of major.

== Career with Worcestershire ==
When county cricket resumed in 1919, he played five times for Sussex in the Championship (taking his first wicket, that of Andy Ducat, in June) but also appeared for Worcestershire (who did not re-enter the Championship until the following season) in a number of first-class friendly matches. It was in the last of these, in late August, that he took 7–56 against Warwickshire; these were to remain his career-best bowling figures.

From 1920 onwards, he appeared for Worcestershire. His first-class statistics were relatively modest, but his dedication to Worcestershire kept them going through lean times. He had three stints as county captain, in 1920–21, 1926 and 1928-29: his obituary in Wisden said that "he was prepared to step into the breach when no one else would". He was an indefatigable fund-raiser for the county team: "He formed a concert party which toured the county in the off-season to raise money to pay professionals and improve the club's grounds and facilities."

Not always able to play regularly, in his best year, 1926, he hit 920 runs at 27.05, and compiled his only two centuries: 103 and 125, scored opening the batting in each of two matches against Hampshire. He also claimed 22 wickets, including 5–69 against Leicestershire. He toured Argentina with Marylebone Cricket Club (MCC) that winter, though with little personal success.

== 1937 Tour of Berlin ==
Jewell captained a team of amateur cricketers (some of whom had once played first-class cricket) under the name the Gentlemen of Worcestershire. This team included Peter Huntington-Whiteley and Robin Whetherly. They were ordered not to lose by the MCC because of the growing tensions between the UK and Nazi Germany. The Gentlemen of Worcestershire won all three matches comfortably. Jewell made a friend in Felix Menzel, a man that was the champion of German cricket. He talked about him to Hans von Tschammer und Osten, who felt that cricket could never become a steady sport in Germany. Jewell scored a century in his final match in Berlin, but hit only 4 boundaries - because of the width of the pitch. After he had finished his innings he collapsed onto a deckchair and fell asleep - still in his whites.

== Later life ==
Jewell played little from 1930 onwards because of ill-health, and his final first-class game came in 1933, when he made 3 and 16 against the touring West Indians. Thereafter he maintained his association with Worcestershire, serving as president from 1950 to 1955.

He led a local battalion of the Home Guard in World War II. He was appointed a CBE in 1954, "For public services in Worcestershire". He died in Whiteleaf, Buckinghamshire at the age of 92.

Several of Jewell's relations played first-class cricket: his brothers Arthur and John both played for Orange Free State (Arthur also appeared for Worcestershire) and his nephew (also John) played twice for Worcestershire in 1939. His brother-in-law William Taylor also captained Worcestershire.

Sporting positions
Preceded by William Taylor	Worcestershire County Cricket Captain; 1920–1921	Succeeded by William Taylor
Preceded by Maurice Foster	Worcestershire County Cricket Captain; 1926	Succeeded by Cecil Ponsonby
Preceded by Cecil Ponsonby	Worcestershire County Cricket Captain; 1928–1929	Succeeded by John Coventry
