= Reg Perks =

English cricketer

Personal information
- Full name: Reginald Thomas David Perks
- Batting: Left-handed
- Bowling: Right-arm fast-medium

International information
- National side: England
- Test debut: 3 March 1939 v South Africa
- Last Test: 19 August 1939 v West Indies

Career statistics
Competition	Test	First-class
Matches	2	595
Runs scored	3	8,956
Batting average	–	12.20
100s/50s	0/0	0/14
Top score	2*	75
Balls bowled	829	116,074
Wickets	11	2,233
Bowling average	32.27	24.07
5 wickets in innings	2	143
10 wickets in match	0	24
Best bowling	5/100	9/40
Catches/stumpings	1/–	238/–
- Source: CricInfo, 10 September 2022

Reginald Thomas David Perks (4 October 1911 – 22 November 1977) was an English cricketer who played in two Test matches in 1939, and was the mainstay of Worcestershire's bowling for a long period from the middle 1930s until the middle 1950s. He was also an aggressive left-handed tail-end slogger, who frequently hit up thirty runs in twenty or so minutes, and on three occasions hit three sixes off consecutive balls. His highest first-class score of 75 against Nottinghamshire at Trent Bridge in 1938 took just thirty minutes. He does, however, hold the world record for the most ducks in a first-class career, with 156.

Perks was first involved with Worcestershire as early as 1928, when he joined their ground staff. He showed considerable promise in his first season with the first team in 1930, with 59 wickets for 23 each, with 7 for 20 against Leicestershire on a rain-affected wicket his outstanding performance. It was several years before he improved upon this, but by 1935 he was clearly one of the hardest-working of several emerging pace bowlers with 119 wickets for less than 22 each and an annual output of around a thousand overs per season. The following three years saw Perks maintain his form. he took fifteen for 106 against Essex at Worcester in 1937, the best match figures of his career.

Perks was chosen for the tour of South Africa in 1938–1939. He played in only the last match, the famous 'Timeless Test' taking 5 for 100 on the most docile of wickets in the first innings. Perks went on to have his best season ever in 1939, with 159 wickets for less than 20 runs each, including thirteen hauls of five or more wickets in an innings in the County Championship. He again played in one Test against the West Indies but further progress was thwarted by the war.

Perks was 34 when cricket resumed in 1946 and though he never came back into representative calculations, he maintained a surprising consistency for the rest of his career: his first-class averages between 1946 and 1955 were all within the very narrow range from 23.28 in 1946 to 26.16 in 1951. Perks' tireless fast-medium bowling was considered an important part of Worcestershire's rise to third in the County Championship in 1949 and fourth in 1951.

In his last season, 1955, Perks became the first professional captain of Worcestershire, taking five wickets for 79 runs against Hampshire in his last match, in so doing raising his aggregate to 100 wickets for the sixteenth consecutive season. This feat is bettered only by Derek Shackleton and Tich Freeman.

Perks played more than 500 matches for Worcestershire. He was the only man to take two thousand wickets for the county: his final total of 2,143 Worcestershire wickets (out of 2,233 in all) easily a county record, being more than 500 victims clear of second-placed Norman Gifford. Perks took more first-class wickets than any player who was never chosen as a Wisden Cricketer of the Year.

His father Thomas Perks had one first-class game for Marylebone Cricket Club (MCC) in 1902.

Sporting positions
Preceded by Ronald Bird	Worcestershire County Cricket Captain; 1955	Succeeded by Peter Richardson
