= Harry Foster (cricketer) =

English cricketer

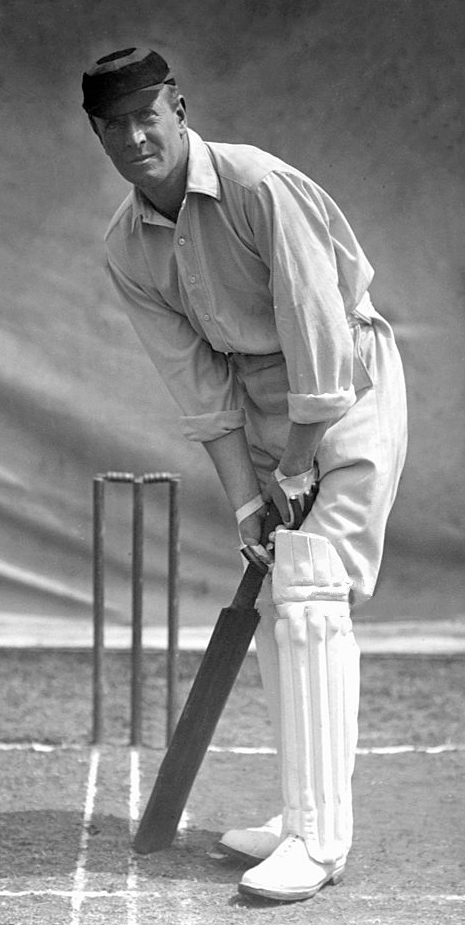

Personal information
- Full name: Henry Knollys Foster
- Born: 30 October 1873; Malvern, Worcestershire, England
- Died: 23 June 1950 (aged 76); Kingsthorne, Herefordshire, England
- Height: 6 ft 0 in (1.83 m)
- Batting: Right-handed
- Bowling: Right-arm fast-medium

Domestic team information
- Years: Team
- 1894–1896: Oxford University
- 1897–1909: Marylebone Cricket Club
- 1899–1925: Worcestershire
- First-class debut: 21 May 1894 Oxford University v AJ Webbe's XI
- Last First-class: 19 August 1925 Worcestershire v Middlesex

Career statistics
Competition	First-class
Matches	289
Runs scored	17,154
Batting average	34.10
100s/50s	29/93
Top score	216
Balls bowled	724
Wickets	15
Bowling average	29.60
5 wickets in innings	0
10 wickets in match	0
Best bowling	3/63
Catches/stumpings	208/–
- Source: espncricinfo.com, 14 October 2012

Henry Knollys Foster MBE (30 October 1873 – 23 June 1950) was an English first-class cricketer who played for Oxford University and Worcestershire. He first played for Worcestershire in 1888 at the age of only 14.

The oldest of seven brothers who played cricket for Worcestershire, Foster was a forceful right-handed middle-order batsman who acted as captain at Worcestershire for 11 of the first 12 season in which the county competed in the County Championship. He was also for many of those seasons second only to his brother R.E. "Tip" Foster as the county's leading batsman.

Educated at Malvern College, Foster matriculated at Trinity College, Oxford in 1892, and first played first-class cricket at Oxford. Not picked for any matches at all in 1893, he won a Blue against Cambridge in each of the next three seasons. In the Varsity match of 1895, he scored 121 in two hours as Oxford, set a target of 331 to win, reached just 196 all out.

Foster captained Worcestershire in the county's first Championship match in 1899 and led the side every season until 1910, except for 1901. He scored 1,000 runs in a season eight times, and five times averaged more than 40 runs per innings. Among his 29 first-class centuries, he hit 216 against Somerset in 1903 — the first double hundred for Worcestershire in first-class cricket —and 215 against Warwickshire in 1908, both at Worcester.

Unlike his brother R.E. "Tip" Foster, Foster did not play Test cricket, but he led the amateur side in both Gentlemen v Players matches in 1910, and was named as a Wisden Cricketer of the Year in 1911. He stood down as Worcestershire captain after 1910, but returned for the 1913 season. He then played intermittently until 1925, when he finally retired. In 1907, 1912 and again after the First World War, he acted as an England selector.

Foster was also a champion rackets player, being English singles champion eight times and winning several doubles titles. He and his brother, W. L. Foster, won the Public Schools Championship for Malvern in 1892. In the next four years he represented Oxford and proved victorious in both Singles and Doubles. Several times, efficiently partnered, he carried off the Doubles Championship, and from 1894 to 1900 and again in 1904 he won the Singles Championship. He also represented Oxford University at rackets for four years.

== The Foster family ==
Foster was the oldest of the seven sons of Henry Foster who in 1867, aged 23, joined the staff of Malvern College, a public school founded in 1865. He was ordained as a priest in 1869, and married in 1871 when he took up a position as a housemaster at Malvern College, a post which he held for 48 years. He was an accomplished all-round sportsman who played not only cricket and fives, but was also a rower and an archer for Winchester College, Cambridge. He made many contributions to sport in Malvern and was active in the making of the cricket pitch, acquiring a football field, swimming baths and racquets courts. He was the first scratch golfer in the Midlands and a founder member of Worcestershire Golf Club. Of the 10 surviving children, there were 7 boys and 3 girls. All seven brothers born at No 5 later joined their father's house as pupils and for virtually 25 years held sway in the sporting arena.

Between them, the seven Foster brothers scored a total of 42,000 runs in First Class Cricket. The girls also played cricket and were exceptional golfers and Cicely played for England.

== Private life ==
Foster was land agent for the Stoke Edith and Prestwood estates of PH Foley.

Sporting positions
Preceded by new title	Worcestershire County Cricket Captain; 1899–1900	Succeeded by Tip Foster
Preceded by Tip Foster	Worcestershire County Cricket Captain; 1902–1910	Succeeded by George Simpson-Hayward
Preceded by George Simpson-Hayward	Worcestershire County Cricket Captain; 1913	Succeeded by William Taylor
