= Phil Salt =

Welsh cricketer (born 1996)

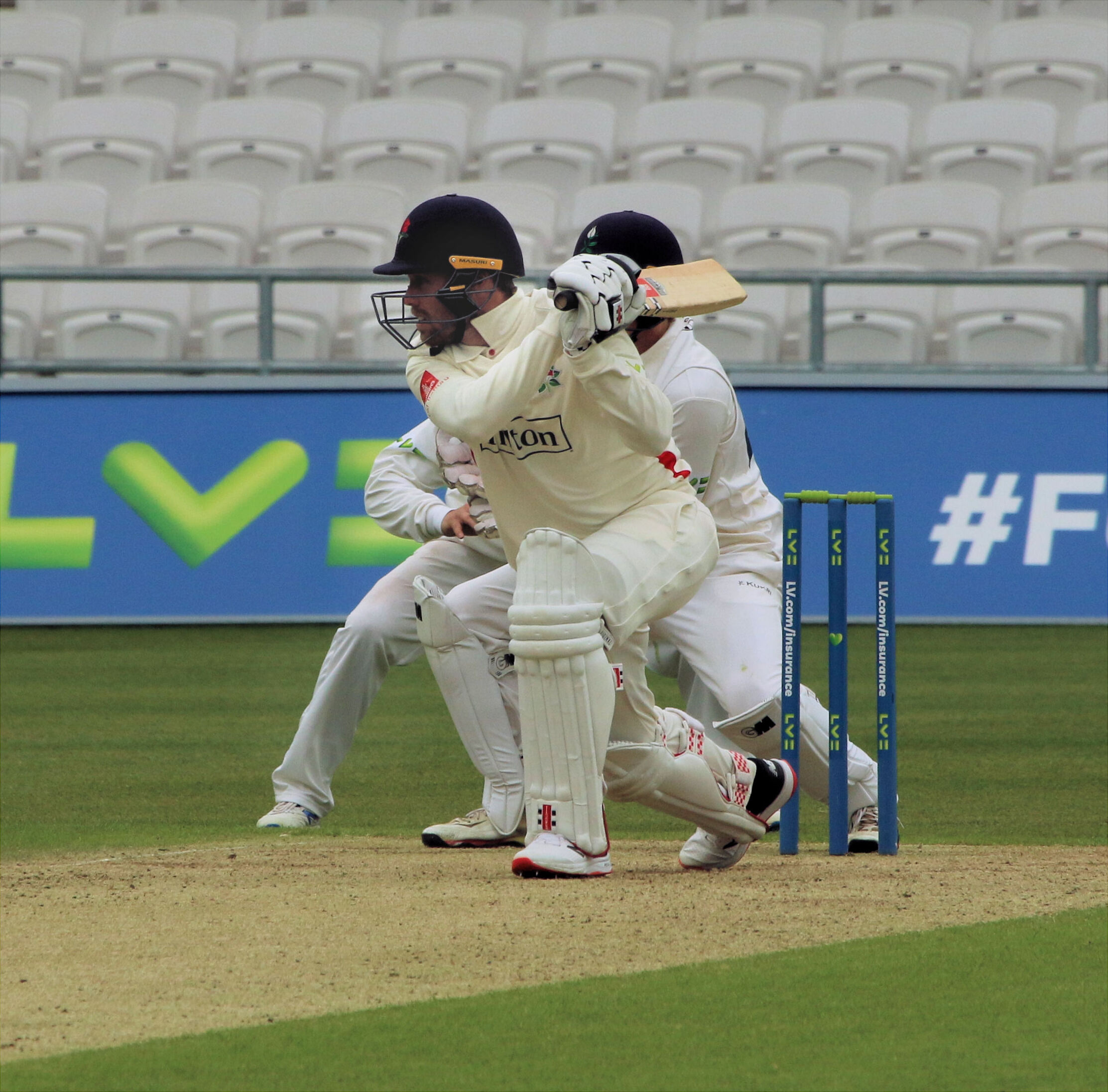
- Salt in 2022

Personal information
- Full name: Philip Dean Salt
- Born: 28 August 1996 (age 30); Bodelwyddan, Denbighshire, Wales
- Height: 5 ft 10 in (1.78 m)
- Batting: Right-handed
- Bowling: Right-arm off spin
- Role: Wicket-keeper-batter

International information
- National side: England (2021–present)
- ODI debut (cap 262): 8 July 2021 v Pakistan
- Last ODI: 1 March 2025 v South Africa
- ODI shirt no.: 61
- T20I debut (cap 94): 26 January 2022 v West Indies
- Last T20I: 11 July 2026 v India
- T20I shirt no.: 61

Domestic team information
- Years: Team
- 2015–2021: Sussex
- 2018; 2022: Lahore Qalandars
- 2019–2021: Islamabad United
- 2019: Barbados Tridents
- 2019/20–2020/21: Adelaide Strikers
- 2021–2025: Manchester Originals
- 2021: Dambulla Giants
- 2022–present: Lancashire
- 2023–2024: Pretoria Capitals
- 2023: Delhi Capitals
- 2024: Kolkata Knight Riders
- 2024–2025/26: Abu Dhabi Knight Riders
- 2025–present: Royal Challengers Bengaluru
- 2026: Welsh Fire

Career statistics
Competition	ODI	T20I	FC	LA
Matches	33	65	54	49
Runs scored	988	1,852	2,770	1,482
Batting average	31.87	34.94	32.58	32.21
100s/50s	1/5	4/10	6/14	2/7
Top score	122	141*	148	137*
Catches/stumpings	16/0	38/2	79/7	21/0
Medal record
Men's cricket
Representing England
ICC T20 World Cup
Winner	2022 Australia
- Source: ESPNcricinfo, 11 July 2026

Philip Dean Salt (born 28 August 1996) is a Welsh professional cricketer who plays internationally for England (Note: Wales is a part of the England and Wales Cricket Board, and Welsh cricketers are eligible to compete for England internationally.) and domestically for Lancashire County Cricket Club, and previously for Sussex. Primarily an aggressive right-handed opening batter, he sometimes keeps wicket and, less frequently, bowls right-arm off spin. Salt made his international debut for England in July 2021. Born in Wales, he moved in his youth to Barbados and then to England. Salt was part of the England team that won the 2022 ICC T20 World Cup. He made history after scoring two consecutive centuries in T20Is against West Indies.

== Early life ==
Salt was born on 28 August 1996 in Bodelwyddan, Wales. He is of English descent with roots in Manchester. He began playing cricket in St Asaph and played for the North East Wales Under-11s. He attended school in Chester, and when he was 10 years old his family moved to Barbados. As a result, he met the Barbados residency requirement, and so was eligible to play for either England or the West Indies. Whilst in Barbados he played with future Sussex and England colleague Jofra Archer. Salt returned to the United Kingdom at the age of 15, when he attended the Reed's School on a cricket scholarship.

== Domestic career ==
In 2013, Salt played for Guildford Cricket Club, before being signed to the Sussex Academy for the 2014 season. Salt played Second XI matches as well as playing in the 2014 Sussex Cricket League Premier Division for a Sussex Cricket Board Development XI, and also Brighton & Hove. In the Sussex Premier League, Salt scored 200* from 129 balls in a match against Horsham, as well as 147* against the Preston Nomads, and 51 from 33 balls against the league's eventual winners, Roffey. In August 2014, he was awarded the Player of the Month trophy.

Salt was retained by Sussex for the 2015 season, and scored 72 from 52 balls in a May 2015 Sussex Premier League match against Cuckfield Cricket Club. He also represented Brighton and Hove, and top-scoring for them with 39 in a match against Middleton. In June 2015, he scored 43 in a Sussex second XI match against Surrey, in a Sussex team including Mahela Jayawardene and Ashar Zaidi. Salt made his List A debut in a 2015 Royal London One-Day Cup match against Essex; he was the 29th different player to play for Sussex in the 2015 Royal London One-Day Cup. Opening the batting, Salt scored 22 from 20 balls; the match was eventually a no result due to rain.

Prior to the beginning of the 2016 season, Salt was awarded a junior professional contract. He made his Twenty20 debut on 20 May 2016 for Sussex against Gloucestershire in the 2016 NatWest t20 Blast. On 8 July 2016 he made his first-class debut for Sussex during Pakistan's tour of England.

On 10 September 2019, Salt signed for Adelaide Strikers as one of their overseas players for the 2019–20 Big Bash League season.

Salt missed the start of the 2021 County Championship season due to a broken foot after a bicycle accident. Salt announced a move from Sussex to Lancashire CCC for the 2022 season. In April 2022, he was bought by the Manchester Originals for the 2022 season of The Hundred.

He was bought by Delhi Capitals to play in the 2023 IPL season for ₹2 crore (£160,000) in the IPL auction held on 23 December 2022.

Kolkata Knight Riders named Phil Salt as a replacement for Jason Roy after the latter pulled out of the upcoming 2024 IPL season owing to personal reasons. In the 2025 IPL Mega Auction, Salt was bought by Royal Challengers Bengaluru for ₹11.50 crore (£910,000). He was a regular in the Knight Riders squad when they won IPL 2024 and in the Royal Challengers squad that won IPL 2025.

== International career ==
In May 2019, Salt was added to England's Twenty20 International (T20I) squad for the one-off match against Pakistan, replacing an injured Dawid Malan, but did not play.

In July 2021, having previously trained with the squad earlier in the summer, Salt was named in England's ODI squad for their series against Pakistan, after the original squad for the tour was forced to withdraw following positive tests for COVID-19. Salt made his ODI debut on 8 July 2021, for England against Pakistan. In December 2021, Salt was named in England's Twenty20 International (T20I) squad for their series against the West Indies. He made his T20I debut on 26 January 2022, for England against the West Indies.

In June 2022, in the opening match against the Netherlands, Salt scored his first century in ODI cricket, with 122 runs. During the match, England scored 498 runs, the highest score in ODI and List-A history, with Salt being one of three centurions alongside Dawid Malan and Jos Buttler.

On 13 November 2022, Salt won the 2022 T20 World Cup with England. He made two appearances at the tournament, playing in both the semi-final and final of the competition.

Salt was named in both the ODI and T20 squads for England's 2023-24 tour of the West Indies. In the third T20I of the series, he hit his maiden T20 international century, becoming the fifth England men's batter to do so. In the fourth T20I, he made another century, and in the process achieved several notable feats. His score of 119 was the highest score by an England men's player in a T20 international. Salt also became the first England men's batter to hit two centuries in international T20 cricket, and only the third men's batter to hit back-to-back international T20 centuries.

Salt was named in the squad for the 2024 T20 World Cup. In the match against West Indies, he scored an unbeaten 87 off 47 balls, including 30 runs in the 16th over, bowled by Romario Shepherd; his innings featured seven fours and five sixes.

== Personal life ==
Salt is married to Abi McLaven. The two became parents in 2025.

== International Centuries ==
=== One Day International centuries ===
No.	Runs	Balls	Opponent	Venue	Date	Result
1	122	93	Netherlands	VRA Amsterdam Cricket Ground, Amstelveen	17 June 2022	Won

=== Twenty20 International centuries ===
No.	Runs	Balls	Opponent	Venue	Date	Result
1	109*	56	West Indies	National Cricket Stadium, St George's	16 December 2023	Won
2	119	57	West Indies	Brian Lara Cricket Academy, Tarouba	19 December 2023	Won
3	103*	54	West Indies	Kensington Oval, Bridgetown	9 November 2024	Won
4	141*	60	South Africa	Old Trafford, Manchester	12 September 2025	Won
