= Dominic Clapp =

English cricketer

Personal information
- Full name: Dominic Adrian Clapp
- Born: 25 May 1980 (age 46); Southport, Lancashire, England
- Batting: Right-handed
- Bowling: Right-arm medium

Domestic team information
- Years: Team
- 2000: Sussex Cricket Board
- 2002: Sussex
- 2003: Hampshire

Career statistics
Competition	First-class	List A
Matches	2	3
Runs scored	10	57
Batting average	5.00	19.00
100s/50s	–/–	–/–
Top score	6	43
Balls bowled	0	36
Wickets	–	3
Bowling average	–	15.33
5 wickets in innings	–	–
10 wickets in match	–	–
Best bowling	–	3/46
Catches/stumpings	–/–	–/–
- Source: Cricinfo, 6 June 2023

Dominic Adrian Clapp (born 25 May 1980) is an English former cricketer.

Clapp was born at Southport in May 1980 and was educated at Lancing College. Clapp made his senior debut in county cricket for the Sussex Cricket Board in a List A one-day match against Herefordshire at Colwall in the 1st round of the 2000 NatWest Trophy; with Sussex winning the match, he subsequently appeared in the following round against Berkshire at Hastings, which Sussex lost. In 2000, he was offered a one-year contract extension by Sussex, alongside Paul Havell, Matt Prior, and Michael Yardy. Having played for the Sussex Second XI in 3-day matches since 1999, Clapp made his first-class debut for Sussex against Leicestershire at Horsham in the 2002 County Championship; he credited his first-class debut to Les Lenham, who helped Clapp to improve his batting in the nets during the winter of 2001–02. He made a single one-day appearance for Sussex, against the touring West Indies A cricket team at Hove in 2002. Having been released by Sussex at the end of the 2002 season, Clapp joined Hampshire for the 2003 season. He made just one first-class appearance for Hampshire, against Oxford UCCE at Oxford in 2003. He was released by Hampshire at the end of the 2005 season.

Clapp proceeded to play club cricket for Brighton and Hove Cricket Club. In 2006, he became only the third player to score 1,000 runs in the Sussex Cricket League. The following season, he joined Worthing Cricket Club as captain. In May 2008, he made the then highest individual score in the Sussex Cricket League by a Worthing batsman, when he made 200 not out at Manor Road against Pulborough Cricket Club.
