= Cricket in Sussex =

Cricket in Sussex refers to the sport of cricket in relation to its participation and history within Sussex, England. One of the most popular sports in Sussex, it is commonly believed that cricket was developed in Sussex and the neighbouring counties of Kent and Surrey. Records from 1611 indicate the first time that the sport was documented in Sussex; this is also the first reference to cricket being played by adults. The first reference to women's cricket is also from Sussex and dates from 1677; a match between two Sussex women's teams playing in London is documented from 1747. Formed in 1839, Sussex County Cricket Club is believed to be the oldest professional sports club in the world and is the oldest of the county cricket clubs. Sussex players, including Jem Broadbridge and William Lillywhite were instrumental in bringing about the change from underarm bowling to roundarm bowling, which later developed into overarm bowling. For some time roundarm bowling was referred to as 'Sussex bowling'.

Sussex's 'golden era' was in the 2000s when the club won 8 competitions including the County Championship three times, winning the County Championship for the first time in 2003. Formed in 1971, the Sussex Cricket League is believed to be the largest adult cricket league in the world, with 335 teams in 2018.

== Origins and development ==
=== Earliest recorded history ===
A mural at Cocking church (c1350) showing shepherds playing a bat and ball game is sometimes held to show that cricket existed earlier than the 16th and 17th centuries, but no stumps are shown in the mural and although the mural may show a sport it is not recognisably cricket.

The map of pre-1675 references to cricket shows a crescent with its most westerly point at Selsey, rising to Surrey and Kent in the north and on to Ruckinge in Kent, close to the Sussex border in east. Wynne-Thomas suggests that cricket is likely to have begun approximately where the three counties meet, around East Grinstead, and spread out from there.

The first reference to cricket being played as an adult sport was in 1611, when two men in Sidlesham were prosecuted for playing cricket on Sunday instead of going to church. In 1622, several parishioners of Boxgrove, near Chichester in west Sussex, were prosecuted for playing cricket in a churchyard on Sunday, 5 May. There were three reasons for the prosecution: one was that it contravened a local bye-law; another reflected concern about church windows which may or may not have been broken; the third was that a little childe had like to have her braines beaten out with a cricket batt! The latter reason was because the rules at the time allowed the batsman to hit the ball twice and so fielding near the batsman was very hazardous, as two later incidents drastically confirm.

In 1624, a fatality occurred at Horsted Keynes when a fielder called Jasper Vinall was struck on the head by the batsman, Edward Tye, who was trying to hit the ball a second time to avoid being caught. Vinall is thus the earliest recorded cricketing fatality. The matter was recorded in a coroner's court, which returned a verdict of misadventure. The tragedy was repeated in 1647 when another fatality was recorded at Selsey a player called Henry Brand being hit on the head by a batsman trying to hit the ball a second time. When the first Laws of cricket were encoded in 1744, it was illegal to hit the ball twice and a batsman breaking the rule was to be given out. The record of the 1624 case confirms that two villages, Horsted Keynes and West Hoathly, were involved in the match and provides further evidence of the growth of village cricket.

In 1628, an ecclesiastical case related to a game at East Lavant, near Chichester being played on a Sunday. One of the defendants argued that he had not played during evening prayer time but only before and after. It did him no good as he was fined the statutory 12d and ordered to do penance. Doing penance involved confessing his guilt to the whole East Lavant congregation the following Sunday. In 1637, another ecclesiastical case recorded parishioners of Midhurst playing cricket during evening prayer on Sunday, 26 February.

The record of the 1622 case at Boxgrove contains the earliest reference to the cricket bat. The term "batt" in cricket was peculiar to Sussex and Kent, where coastal smugglers were known in Sussex dialect and Kentish dialect as "batmen" because of the cudgels they carried. The earliest known reference to the wicket is contained in lines written in an old bible in 1680 which invited "All you that do delight in Cricket, come to Marden, pitch your wickets". Marden is north of Chichester.

=== Important cricket matches 1677 onwards ===
In 1677, accounts of Thomas Lennard, 1st Earl of Sussex, include an item which refers to £3 being paid to him when he went to a cricket match being played at "ye Dicker", which was a common near Herstmonceux. In 1694, accounts of Sir John Pelham record 2s 6d paid for a wager concerning a cricket match at Lewes. Cricket was played by women as early as 1677 when it was recorded that Anne Lennard, Countess of Sussex, the wife of the Earl of Sussex was growing tired of the amusement, as played in Dicker near Herstmonceux.

The earliest known newspaper report of a major cricket match was in the Foreign Post dated Wednesday, 7 July 1697:

"The middle of last week a great match at cricket was played in Sussex; there were eleven of a side, and they played for fifty guineas apiece".

The stakes on offer confirm the importance of the fixture and the fact that it was eleven a side suggests that two strong and well-balanced teams were assembled.

There is a newspaper report of a "great match" played in Sussex in 1697 which was 11-a-side and played for high stakes of 50 guineas a side. The match in 1697 was probably Sussex versus another county.

=== 18th century ===
The most notable of the early patrons were a group of aristocrats and businessmen who were active from about 1725, which is the time that press coverage became more regular, perhaps as a result of the patrons' influence. These men included the 2nd Duke of Richmond and Sir William Gage. Slindon was backed by the Duke of Richmond and featured the star player Richard Newland. Village cricket continued to thrive in the 18th century. In 1717, Thomas Marchant, a farmer from Hurstpierpoint in Sussex, first mentioned cricket in his diary. He made numerous references to the game, particularly concerning his local club, until 1727. His son Will played for "our parish", as he often called the Hurstpierpoint team.

The diaries of Marchant and Thomas Turner, another Sussex diarist, from East Hoathly, show that in the 18th century cricket was commonplace in the Sussex Weald. In 1702, the Duke of Richmond's XI defeated an Arundel XI in Sussex. The source for this game is a receipt sent by one Saul Bradley to the Duke on 14 December 1702. The receipt was in respect of one shilling and six pence paid by the Duke "for brandy when your Grace plaid at Cricket with Arundel men". It is thought the brandy was bought to celebrate a victory.

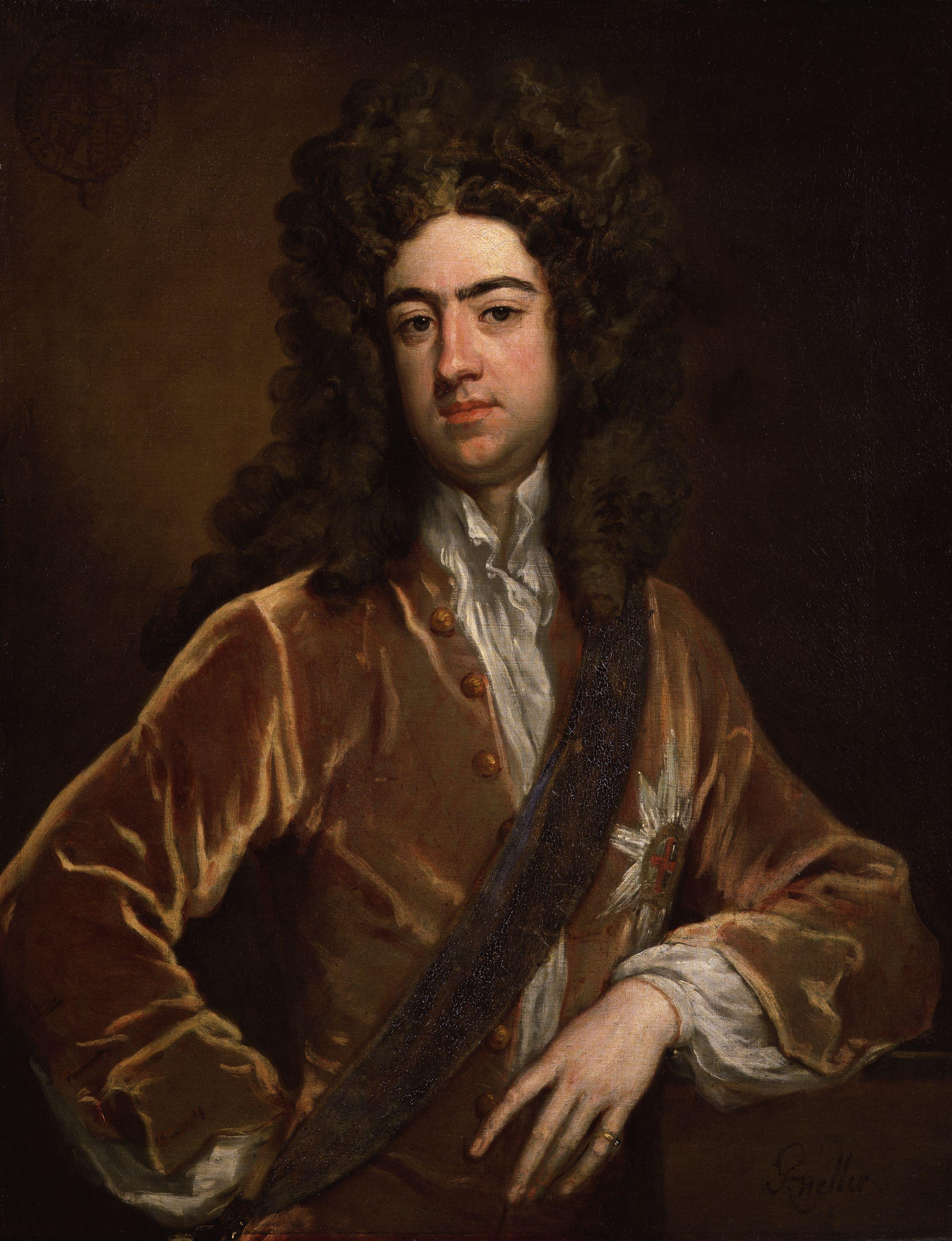
Charles Lennox, 1st Duke of Richmond.

After the 1st Duke of Richmond died in 1723, his son Charles Lennox, 2nd Duke of Richmond, quickly succeeded him as cricket's main benefactor and became a famous patron of Sussex cricket for the next thirty years. The 2nd Duke enjoyed a friendly rivalry with his friend Sir William Gage, another Sussex patron. Their teams played each other many times and their earliest known contest was on Tuesday, 20 July 1725, five days after Sir William's team was beaten by unknown opponents. Our knowledge of these two games is based on a humorous letter sent by Sir William to the Duke on 16 July. Sir William bemoaned that he was "shamefully beaten" the previous day in "his first match of the year" but says nothing of his opponents. He then looked forward to playing the Duke's team next Tuesday and wished his Grace "success in everything except his cricket match". The main rival to Richmond and Gage was Edwin Stead of Maidstone, who was the first of the noted Kent patrons. The Sussex teams of Richmond and Gage enjoyed an inter-county rivalry with Stead's Kent that could have originated the concept of the County Championship. Other good players known to have been active in the 1720s were Edwin Stead of Kent; Edmund Chapman and Stephen Dingate of Surrey; Tim Coleman of London; and Thomas Waymark of Sussex.

In 1727 the first formal rules of cricket, the articles of agreement, were drawn up between the 2nd Duke of Richmond and Mr Alan Brodrick for two matches between a team from Sussex and another from Surrey. Gage's Sussex team in the 1729 season achieved the sport's earliest known innings victory against Kent. Given that Kent had effectively claimed the title of champion county in 1728, the first known instance of such a claim, Sussex could justifiably claim to have won the title in 1729. Sarah Lennox, Duchess of Richmond and Lennox sponsored three cricket matches for her husband Charles Lennox, 2nd Duke of Richmond in 1731 and arranged matches for Slindon in 1741.

Early women's matches were not necessarily genteel affairs. A match, on 13 July 1747, held at the prestigious Artillery Ground in Middlesex (now London) between a team from the villages of Singleton and Charlton (described as the women from the 'Hills of Sussex') and another from West Dean and Chilgrove (described as the women from the 'Dales of Sussex') spilled over into the following day after it was interrupted by crowd trouble. The women playing would have shown particular talent to have played at such as prestigious ground and would have been attended by the Duchess of Richmond. The fixture attracted large sums of gambling money, with sums of over £1,000 at stake for the winners. Contemporary records show that women's matches were played on many occasions between villages in Sussex, Hampshire and Surrey. In 1768 the women of Harting played the women of Rogate three times in a series that attracted crowds of up to 3,000, a number unheard of at the time. In the 1780s and 1790s the Bury Common women's team were so successful when playing in some of the first six-a-side matches that they challenged any eleven in the country to a match, including the men's All England XI to a match, with no response from the men's team.

From 1741, Richmond patronised the famous Slindon Cricket Club, whose team was representative of the county and at one stage was proclaimed to be the best team in England. Slindon's best player was the great Richard Newland, supported by his brothers Adam and John; and by the controversial Edward Aburrow Sr, a good cricketer but a known smuggler. After the death of Richmond in 1751, Sussex cricket declined until the emergence of the Brighton club at its Prince of Wales Ground in 1790. Despite some periods of decline, Sussex continued to be a major cricket county throughout the 18th century. It has been suggested by historians that the Hambledon Club represented Sussex as well as Hampshire for inter-county purposes. Several noted Sussex cricketers, including Richard Nyren, Noah Mann and William Barber, played for Hambledon.

=== Development of roundarm bowling ===
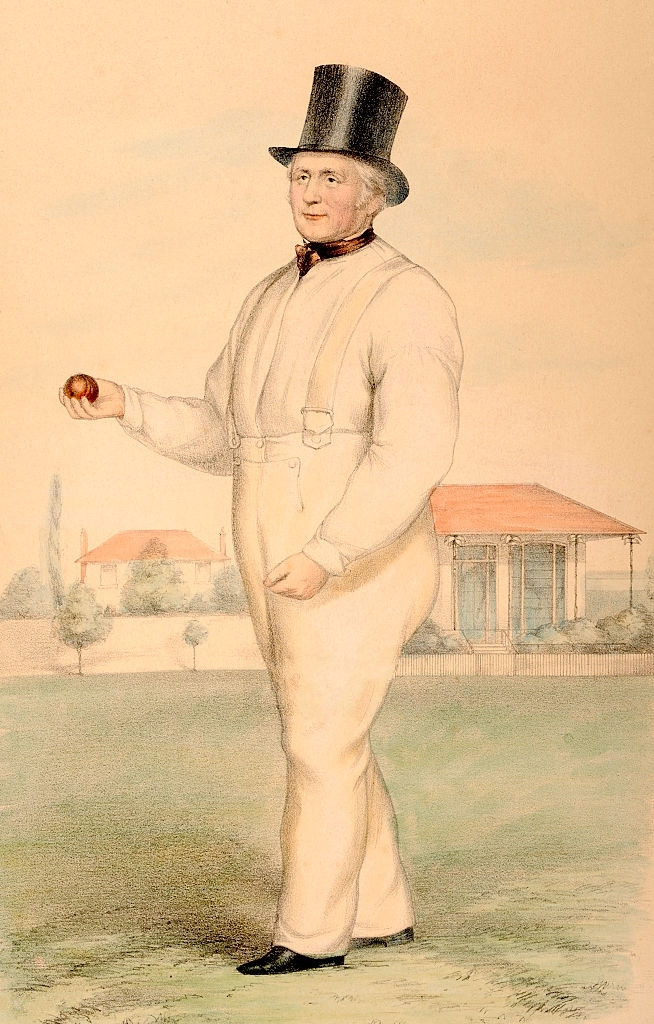
Nicknamed 'the Nonpareil' ('the Unrivalled'), William Lillywhite was one of the Sussex bowlers that helped bring about roundarm bowling

In 1826, Sussex had the best team in England and were acclaimed as the "Champion County" in some quarters. Their success owed much to the prowess of two top-class bowlers William Lillywhite and Jem Broadbridge, both of whom were champions of the roundarm style, when they could get away with it. Lillywhite was one of the all-time great bowlers and was nicknamed "the Nonpareil", while roundarm bowling became known as 'Sussex bowling'. Complaints were made and in 1827 the MCC arranged to test the validity of roundarm bowling by holding three England v Sussex roundarm trial matches. Their purpose was to help the MCC, as the game's lawgivers, to decide if roundarm bowling should be legalised or if the only legitimate style of bowling should be underarm, which had been in use since time immemorial. Sussex won the first two matches but the trial was seen as inconclusive. Although it was many years before roundarm was formally legalised, roundarm was in practice adopted in 1827 as its practitioners, especially Broadbridge and Lillywhite, continued to use it with little, if any, opposition from the umpires.

=== Formation of Sussex County Cricket Club ===
On 17 June 1836, the Sussex Cricket Fund was set up to support county matches, after a meeting in Brighton. This led directly to the formation on 1 March 1839 of Sussex County Cricket Club, England's oldest county club.

In 1851, a Sussex cricketer, William Henty, bowled the first ever ball in a first class cricket match in Australia. In 1864, former Sussex cricketer John Wisden published the 'Wisden Cricketers' Almanack', a cricket reference book that is considered the world's most famous sports reference book.

In 1876 James Lillywhite became the first ever captain of the English cricket team in a Test match, captaining two Tests against Australia in 1876–77.

Also in 1876, Sussex MP third Earl of Sheffield laid out a cricket pitch at Sheffield Park near Haywards Heath. It was used on 12 May 1884 for the first cricket match in England between England and Australia. In 1891, he presented a donation of £150 to the New South Wales Cricket Association which was used to purchase a plate and establish the competition known as the Sheffield Shield, the domestic first-class cricket competition of Australia.

The White Heather Club, the first female cricket club in England was formed in 1887 at Nun Appleton Priory in Yorkshire by eight ladies who thought it "advisable to start a club consequence of the large amount of cricket at Normanhurst, Glynde and Eridge". Although the club was formed in Yorkshire, the eight noblewomen who founded the club were based in Sussex at the country houses of Normanhurst, Glynde and Eridge, which were the seats of the Brassey and Nevill families.

In the late 20th century and early 21st century the County Ground in Hove was used for other cricket matches in addition to matches involving Sussex teams. A One Day International match of the 1999 Cricket World Cup between India and South Africa was staged at Hove. Also, various matches involving England women's cricket team as well as the finals of the 2017 and 2018 Women's Cricket Super League tournaments were held at Hove. The 2019 tournament is also due to be played at Hove.

== Governing body ==
On 1 November 2015, the Sussex Cricket Board (SCB) merged with Sussex County Cricket Club (SCCC) to form a single governing body for cricket in Sussex, called Sussex Cricket Limited (SCL).

== County cricket ==
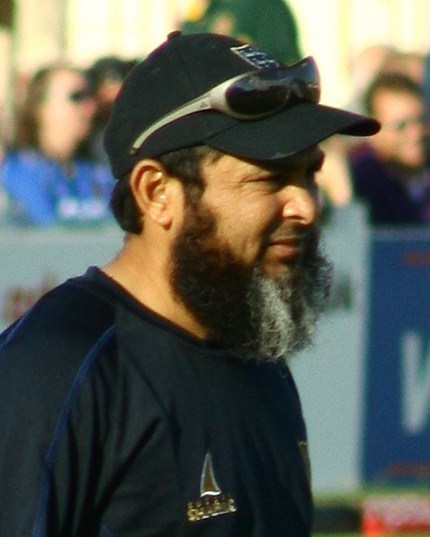
Mushtaq Ahmed played a major role in Sussex's first ever County Championship win in 2003 and the golden era of the 2000s

=== Men ===
It has been suggested that the first county match was the match in 1697 recorded as a "great match" worth 50 guineas was between Sussex and another county. Teams represented Sussex unofficially but it was not until 1836 a meeting took place in Brighton to set up a Sussex Cricket Fund and on 1 March 1839 Sussex County Cricket Club was formally constituted, the first county cricket club in cricket history. Following the formation of the County Championship in 1890, Sussex were runners-up on seven occasions before winning the County Championship in 2003, 2006 and 2007.

==== Limited overs ====
Sussex won the inaugural one-day Gillette Cup in 1963, a feat they repeated the following year and again in 1978. The competition was then known as the NatWest trophy, which they won in 1986 and then the Cheltenham & Gloucester Trophy, which they won in 2006.

Sussex also won the 1982 Sunday League, then winning the 2008 and 2009 editions of the 40-over competition.

==== Twenty20 ====
The Sussex Sharks won the Twenty20 Cup in 2009 and were runners-up in the 2018 t20 Blast.

As winners of the 2009 Twenty20 Cup the Sussex Sharks competed in the 2009 Champions League Twenty20 tournament in India. Sussex suffered defeats at the Feroz Shah Kotla Ground in Delhi to Australia's New South Wales Blues and the Diamond Eagles, from South Africa.

=== Women ===
In the women's game, Sussex have won the Women's County Championship six times, in 2003, 2004, 2005, 2008, 2010 and 2013. With Kent, they have been referred to as being in the 'big two' of the women's game.

=== County cricket grounds ===
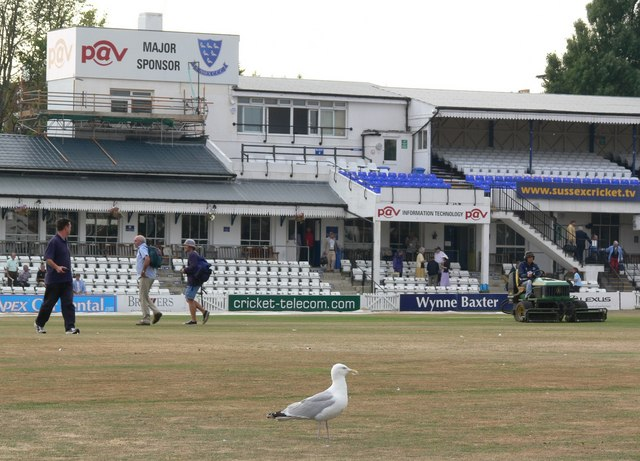
The County Ground in Hove, home of Sussex County Cricket Club

Sixteen different grounds in Sussex have been used for first class county cricket. Sussex's first main ground was Royal New Ground in Brighton to 1847. From 1848 to 1871, Sussex CCC used the Royal Brunswick Ground in Hove, also known as C H Gausden's Ground, and since 1872, the club has been based at the County Cricket Ground, Hove, its present home.

Since Cricketfield Road in Horsham was not awarded any matches for the 2016 season due to financial difficulties. The County Ground and Arundel Castle are the only two grounds two grounds scheduled to host Sussex matches in the 2016 season.

Used annually as an outground by Kent County Cricket Club, the Nevill Ground in Tunbridge Wells straddles the historic boundary between Sussex and Kent. Following administrative changes in 1894 the ground and its surrounding area has been administered as part of Kent.

== Club cricket ==
Founded in 1971, the Sussex Cricket League is the top level of competition for recreational club cricket in Sussex. Since 1999 the Premier Division of the Sussex Premier League has been a designated ECB Premier League. After Sussex clubs voted unanimously to allow Guernsey Sarnians to join the competition, Guernsey joined the Sussex Cricket League from 2016. With nine titles, Preston Nomads are the league's most successful club.

Since November 2018 the Sussex Cricket League is the largest adult cricket league in the world, with 335 participating teams in 34 divisions. In 2018 the Sussex Cricket League saw the integration of the East Sussex Cricket League, Mid Sussex Cricket League, West Sussex Invitation Cricket League and the Sussex Premier Cricket League.

In 1997 Eastbourne Cricket Club became the first Sussex team to have won the ECB National Club Cricket Championship.

Sussex has some of the oldest cricket clubs in the world. Dating from 1704, Arundel is the oldest cricket club in Sussex. Other cricket clubs formed in the 18th century include Steyning (1721), East Grinstead (1731, reformed 1857), Slindon (1740-1754), Battle (1738), Rye (1754), Maresfield (1756), Firle (1758), Rottingdean (1758), Chalvington & Ripe (1762), Broadwater (1771), Henfield (1771), Petworth (1784), Brighton (1790-1839), Southwick (1790) and Wadhurst & Lamberhurst (1790).

== International cricket ==
International cricket took place in Hove in part of the 1999 Cricket World Cup when India played South Africa.

In 1987 and 2005 England played Australia in women's Test matches at Hove. This was followed in 2013 England played Australia twice in One Day Internationals at Hove, and played Australia at Hove in a T20 match in 2015. They are due to play Australia in a T20 match again at Hove in 2019.

== Notable cricketers from Sussex ==
The following people from Sussex have played Test cricket for England:

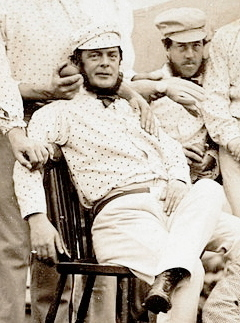
John Wisden in 1859 in North America on the first overseas England tour

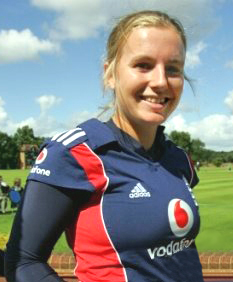
Holly Colvin holds the record for the youngest player to play Test cricket of either sex

=== Men ===
- Jem Broadbridge
- Henry Charlwood
- George Cox Sr
- Mason Crane
- Jemmy Dean
- Ed Giddins
- Jack Hobbs
- James Kirtley
- James Langridge
- James Lillywhite
- John Lillywhite
- William Lillywhite
- Alan Oakman
- Jim Parks (born 1903)
- Jim Parks (born 1931)
- Albert Relf
- John Snow
- James Southerton
- Maurice Tate
- Joe Vine
- Alan Wells
- Colin Wells
- John Wisden

=== Women ===
- Caroline Atkins
- Holly Colvin
- Clare Connor
- Kate Oakenfold
- Barbara Pont
- Charlie Russell (cricketer)
- Alexia Walker
- Elaine Wulcko

== See also ==
- Sport in Sussex
- Cricket in England

== Bibliography ==
- Brabant, Frederick Gaspard (1909). Rambles in Sussex. Sussex: Methuen.
- Collins, Tony, ed. (2005). Encyclopedia of Traditional British Rural Sports. Routledge. ISBN 978-0415352246.
- Doughan, David; Gordon, Peter (2007). Women, Clubs and Associations in Britain. Routledge. ISBN 978-1134204366.
- Duncan, Isabelle (2013). Skirting the boundary: a History of Women's Cricket. Biteback Publishing. ISBN 978-1849546119.
- Gomme, Alice Bertha (1894). The traditional games of England, Scotland and Ireland : with tunes, singing rhymes and methods of playing according to the variants extant and recorded in different parts of the kingdom. London: David Nutt.
- Guttman, Allen (1991). Women's Sports: A History. Columbia University Press. ISBN 978-0231069571.
- Haygarth, Arthur (1862). Scores & Biographies, Volume 1 (1744–1826). Lillywhite.
- Locke, Tim (2011). Slow Sussex and the South Downs. Buckinghamshire: Bradt Travel Guides. ISBN 9781841623436.
- McCann, Tim (2004). Sussex Cricket in the Eighteenth Century. Sussex Record Society.
- McCrone, Kathleen (1988). Playing the Game: Sport and the Physical Emancipation of English Women, 1870-1914. University Press of Kentucky. ISBN 978-0813116419.
- Nauright, John (2012). Sports Around the World: History, Culture, and Practice. ABC-CLIO. ISBN 978-1598843002.
- Tomlinson, Allan (2010). A Dictionary of Sports Studies. Oxford: Oxford University Press. ISBN 978-0199213818.
- Waghorn, H. T. (1906). The Dawn of Cricket. Electric Press. ISBN 978-0-94-782117-3.
- Wigglesworth, Neil (2007). The Story of Sport in England. Routledge. ISBN 978-1134259953.
- Wynne-Thomas, Peter (1997). The History of Cricket: From the Weald to the World. Stationery Office. ISBN 9780117020481.
