= New Zealand women's cricket team in England in 2007 =

	England	New Zealand
- Dates: 8 – 30 August 2007
Captains	Charlotte Edwards	Haidee Tiffen

One Day International series
- Results: New Zealand won the 6-match series 3–2
Most runs	Claire Taylor (205)	Aimee Watkins (193)
Most wickets	Jenny Gunn (9)	Nicola Browne (7)
- Player of the series: Aimee Watkins (NZ)

Twenty20 International series
- Results: England won the 3-match series 2–1
Most runs	Sarah Taylor (118)	Aimee Watkins (88)
Most wickets	Jenny Gunn (4); Lynsey Askew (4)	Amy Satterthwaite (6)

The New Zealand women's national cricket team toured England in August 2008. They played England in 3 Twenty20 Internationals and 6 One Day Internationals. New Zealand won the ODI series 3–2, whilst England won the T20I series 2–1. They also played a T20I against South Africa, who were also touring England that summer, which they won by 97 runs.

== Squads ==
England	New Zealand
Charlotte Edwards (c); Lynsey Askew; Caroline Atkins; Holly Colvin; Lydia Greenway; Isa Guha; Jenny Gunn; Laura Marsh; Beth Morgan; Nicky Shaw; Jane Smit (wk); Claire Taylor; Sarah Taylor (wk)	Haidee Tiffen (c); Suzie Bates; Nicola Browne; Sarah Burke; Rachel Candy; Selena Charteris; Ros Kember; Sara McGlashan; Rowan Milburn (wk); Rachel Priest (wk); Amy Satterthwaite; Sarah Tsukigawa; Aimee Watkins; Helen Watson

== Tour Matches ==
=== 50-over match: Marylebone Cricket Club v New Zealand ===
8 August 2007
Scorecard

New Zealand; 263/9 (50 overs)	v	Marylebone Cricket Club; 158 (46.1 overs)
Rachel Priest 52 (40); Caroline Atkins 2/31 (3 overs)		Beth Morgan 47 (63); Selena Charteris 3/22 (7 overs)

New Zealand Women won by 105 runs
The Wyvern Club, Taunton
Umpires: Charles Puckett (Eng) and David Lawrence (Eng)

- Marylebone Cricket Club Women won the toss and elected to field.

=== 20-over match: England Development Squad v New Zealand ===
10 August 2007
Scorecard

New Zealand; 93/6 (20 overs)	v	England Development Squad; 94/7 (19.4 overs)
Nicola Browne 30 (28); Nicky Myers 2/11 (4 overs)		Alexia Walker 29 (26); Nicola Browne 3/14 (4 overs)

England Development Squad Women won by 3 wickets
Taunton School, Taunton
Umpires: Debbie Beesley (Eng) and Laurie Walker (Eng)

- England Development Squad Women won the toss and elected to field.

== Only T20I: New Zealand v South Africa ==
10 August 2007
Scorecard

New Zealand; 186/7 (20 overs)	v	South Africa; 89 (17.2 overs)
Suzie Bates 62 (37); Johmari Logtenberg 2/35 (4 overs)		Cri-Zelda Brits 23 (25); Helen Watson 3/13 (3 overs)

New Zealand Women won by 97 runs
County Ground, Taunton
Umpires: Charles Puckett (Eng) and John Schofield (Eng)

- New Zealand Women won the toss and elected to bat.
- Suzie Bates, Selena Charteris, Ros Kember, Rowan Milburn (NZ), Susan Benade, Cri-Zelda Brits, Trisha Chetty, Mignon du Preez, Shabnim Ismail, Ashlyn Kilowan, Marcia Letsoalo, Johmari Logtenberg, Sunette Loubser, Alicia Smith and Claire Terblanche (SA) all made their WT20I debuts.

== WT20I Series ==
=== 1st T20 ===
12 August 2007
Scorecard

England; 172/2 (20 overs)	v	New Zealand; 152/6 (20 overs)
Charlotte Edwards 60 (51); Sarah Tsukigawa 2/49 (4 overs)		Aimee Watkins 54* (33); Jenny Gunn 1/18 (3 overs)

England Women won by 20 runs
Bath Cricket Club Ground, Bath
Umpires: Barrie Leadbeater (Eng) and Rob Bailey (Eng)

- England Women won the toss and elected to bat.
- Rachel Candy (NZ) made her WT20I debut.

=== 2nd T20 ===
13 August 2007
Scorecard

New Zealand; 117 (18.1 overs)	v	England; 118/5 (17.4 overs)
Nicola Browne 32 (25); Lynsey Askew 2/13 (3 overs)		Sarah Taylor 52* (50); Nicola Browne 2/28 (4 overs)

England Women won by 5 wickets
Bath Cricket Club Ground, Bath
Umpires: Barrie Leadbeater (Eng) and Trevor Jesty (Eng)

- New Zealand Women won the toss and elected to bat.
- Laura Marsh (Eng) made her WT20I debut.

=== 3rd T20 ===
16 August 2007
Scorecard

New Zealand; 150/6 (20 overs)	v	England; 112 (18 overs)
Sara McGlashan 44 (36); Jenny Gunn 2/25 (4 overs)		Lydia Greenway 29 (23); Amy Satterthwaite 6/17 (4 overs)

New Zealand Women won by 38 runs
County Ground, Taunton
Umpires: Richard Kettleborough (Eng) and Trevor Jesty (Eng)
Player of the match: Amy Satterthwaite (NZ)

- New Zealand Women won the toss and elected to bat.
- Charlie Russell (Eng) made her WT20I debut.

== WODI Series ==
=== 1st ODI ===
17 August 2007
Scorecard

New Zealand; 225/7 (50 overs)	v	England; 204 (48.5 overs)
Suzie Bates 82 (100); Holly Colvin 3/36 (10 overs)		Jenny Gunn 73 (112); Suzie Bates 3/20 (5 overs)

New Zealand Women won by 21 runs
County Ground, Taunton
Umpires: Richard Kettleborough (Eng) and Tim Robinson (Eng)
Player of the match: Suzie Bates (NZ)

- New Zealand Women won the toss and elected to bat.
- Charlie Russell (Eng) made her WODI debut.

=== 2nd ODI ===
19 August 2007
Scorecard

England	v	New Zealand

Match Abandoned
Stratford-upon-Avon Cricket Club Ground, Stratford-upon-Avon
Umpires: Jeff Evans (Eng) and Rob Bailey (Eng)
Player of the match: Sara McGlashan (NZ)

- No toss.
- No play possible due to rain.

=== 3rd ODI ===
23 August 2007
Scorecard

England; 240/3 (50 overs)	v	New Zealand; 243/2 (35.4 overs)
Claire Taylor 110 (133); Haidee Tiffen 1/24 (5 overs)		Sara McGlashan 97* (94); Nicky Shaw 1/42 (6 overs)

New Zealand Women won by 8 wickets
County Ground, Derby
Umpires: Barrie Leadbeater (Eng) and Peter Willey (Eng)

- England Women won the toss and elected to bat.

=== 4th ODI ===
26 August 2007
Scorecard

New Zealand; 239/9 (50 overs)	v	England; 196 (48.5 overs)
Aimee Watkins 111 (130); Laura Marsh 3/49 (7 overs)		Claire Taylor 72 (87); Helen Watson 2/22 (10 overs)

New Zealand Women won by 43 runs
Stanley Park, Blackpool
Umpires: John Holder (Eng) and Richard Kettleborough (Eng)
Player of the match: Aimee Watkins (NZ)

- New Zealand Women won the toss and elected to bat.
- Rachel Candy (NZ) made her WODI debut.

=== 5th ODI ===
27 August 2007
Scorecard

New Zealand; 72 (30.5 overs)	v	England; 73/4 (27.3 overs)
Rowan Milburn 15 (41); Isa Guha 4/11 (7.5 overs)		Sarah Taylor 49* (84); Nicola Browne 3/25 (7 overs)

England Women won by 6 wickets
Stanley Park, Blackpool
Umpires: George Sharp (Eng) and Jeff Evans (Eng)
Player of the match: Jenny Gunn (Eng)

- New Zealand Women won the toss and elected to bat.

=== 6th ODI ===
30 August 2007
Scorecard

New Zealand; 206/8 (50 overs)	v	England; 208/7 (49.5 overs)
Ros Kember 64 (99); Isa Guha 3/27 (10 overs)		Beth Morgan 77 (130); Sarah Tsukigawa 2/30 (6 overs)

England Women won by 3 wickets
Denis Compton Oval, Shenley
Umpires: Jeremy Lloyds (Eng) and Richard Illingworth (Eng)
Player of the match: Beth Morgan (Eng)

- England Women won the toss and elected to field.
