= Hastings United F.C. =

Association football club in England

Hastings United
- Hastings United Club badge
- Full name: Hastings United Football Club
- Nickname: The U's
- Founded: 1893; 133 years ago
- Ground: The Pilot Field
- Capacity: 4,050 (800 seated)
- Chairman: Dean White
- Manager: Ronnie Dolan
- League: Isthmian League South East Division
- 2025–26: Isthmian League South East Division, 17th of 22
- Website: hastingsunited.com
Home colours	Away colours	Third colours

Hastings United Football Club, previously known as Hastings Town, is a semi-professional football club based in Hastings, East Sussex. They currently play in the Isthmian League South East Division and have played their home games at The Pilot Field since 1985, after the demise of the previous Hastings United, whose identity they took on following a name change in 2002.

The club was founded in 1893 as Rock-a-Nore and joined the East Sussex Football League in 1904. They went on to become founder members of the Sussex County Football League in 1920, changing their name to Hastings & St Leonards in 1921, before leaving to join the Southern Amateur Football League in 1927. They had a brief stay in the Corinthian League before becoming founder members of Division Two of the Sussex County League in 1952. They changed their name to Hastings Town in 1976 and took Hastings United's place in the Southern Football League in 1985. They became Hastings United in 2002 and would go on to join the Isthmian League in 2004, where they have remained since.

The club's traditional colours are claret and blue, though for the 2017–18 season their home kit is white with claret and blue trim. Their most successful period was in the 1930s where they won Division One of the Southern Amateur League on four occasions, plus the Sussex Senior Challenge Cup twice. The club also saw success in the 1990s winning the Sussex Senior Cup twice, the Southern League Cup once and the Southern League Southern Division in 1991–92. Their best performance in the FA Cup saw them reach the third round in the 2012–13 season.

== History ==
=== Early years ===
The club was founded in 1893 as Rock-a-Nore and played their home games on the East Hill in Hastings Old Town. They played in local cup competitions winning the Hastings FA run Carlisle Cup on two occasions before becoming inactive between 1899 and 1901, however the club made a return to enjoy more success the local competitions. In 1904 they joined the East Sussex Football League and played at the newly laid out 'Sports Ground' for one season, sharing with St Leonards United, before returning to the East Hill the following season. They won the East Sussex League in the 1907–08 season, however by the years leading up to the First World War, the club were back playing in the local junior leagues.

=== Hastings & St Leonards ===
After the First World War, Rock-a-Nore became founder members of the Sussex County League and moved to the Pilot Field in 1920, after one season in the league they changed name to Hastings & St Leonards FC, to reflect becoming the most prominent team in the town. A merger with local side All Saints was proposed, but the move never went through as All Saints did not want to lose their identity, though several players went on to join Hastings. Not long after the name change, a local team called Old Town United changed their name to Rock-a-Nore, taking on the former identity of the club.

Hastings & St Leonards, often shortened to Hastings, spent seven seasons in the Sussex County League, finishing runners on two occasions before leaving to join the Southern Amateur League in 1927. The team would win Division Two in their first season and were promoted into Division One for the 1928–29 season, where they remained until the outbreak of World War Two. During the 1930s the club enjoyed a highly successful spell, winning the league in 1934–35, 1935–36, 1936–37 and 1938–39, the Sussex Senior Cup in 1935–36 and 1937–38 and the Amateur Football Alliance Senior Cup in 1937–38.

=== Post-war years and new ground ===
After the Second World War, Hastings joined the Corinthian League and played two seasons in the league. However, ahead of the 1948–49 season, the club lost their home ground at the Pilot Field to newly formed professional team Hastings United. The club, now known as Hastings Amateurs were unable to match the rent on the pitch and unable to find a suitable home pitch, forcing them to leave the Corinthian League having only played one league game.

The club returned for the 1949–50 season, playing in the Hastings League and joined the East Sussex League for the 1950–51 season. By now the club were playing their home games on the upper pitch of the Pilot Field, later known as the Firs. Hastings became founder members of Division Two of the Sussex County League in 1952 and would go on to spend nearly thirty years in the league with little success.

=== Hastings Town and the Southern League ===
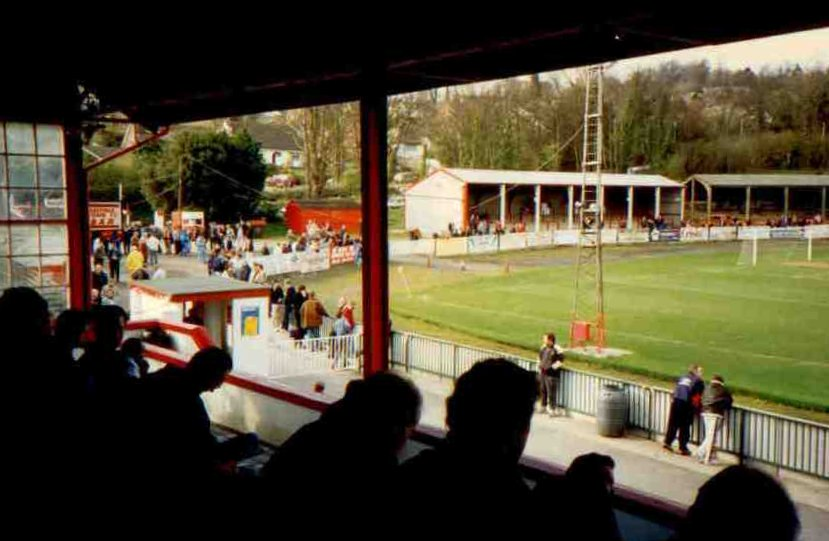
View of the Pilot Field from the main stand, 1990s

In 1976, the club changed name to Hastings Town and part of the late 1970s was spent playing at Bulverhythe, home to Hastings Rangers, whilst the clubhouse and pitch at the Firs was being upgraded. The club won Division Two in 1979–80, winning promotion to Division One where they played until 1985.

Hastings Town applied for membership to the Southern League Premier Division following the folding of Hastings United, but were admitted to the Southern Division following objections from another club. The club negotiated a long-term lease with Hastings Borough Council for the use the Pilot Field and several of old Hastings United players joined the club.

The club's ambition was the win promotion to the Premier Division of the Southern League, but would go onto play several frustrating seasons of top-half finishes. Peter Sillett took charge of the club and built up a side that eventually won promotion, winning the league in 1991–92. The 1990s saw the club enjoy more success winning the Southern League Cup in 1995, beating Leek Town on aggregate and winning the Sussex Senior Cup twice in 1996 and 1998, beating Crawley Town and Burgess Hill Town respectively.

Local lottery winner Mark Gardiner, previously involved at local rivals St Leonards Stamcroft, became involved ahead of the 1997–98 season and made a generous playing budget available to manager Garry Wilson. Even with the healthy budget available, the club found themselves in the bottom half of the table despite the signing of former football league players including Mark Morris and the goal scoring exploits of Stafford Browne. Wilson was sacked after a FA Trophy loss to Bath City and Dean White and Terry White were brought in as joint managers.

Despite a fifth-place finish in the 1998–99 season, the second highest finish in the football league pyramid for the club, there was trouble off the pitch. With Mark Gardiner no longer involved, the club was in administration and also faced the possibility of playing in the Sussex County League, after applying to join the Isthmian League, later changing their mind, but the Southern League had refused their attempt to withdraw their resignation from the League. A consortium led by another local lottery winner Mick Maplesden saved the club from folding and the club were allowed back into the Southern League, but into the Eastern Division. The club finished in the top five for the following two seasons before eventually winning promotion back into the Premier Division after winning the league in 2001–02.

=== Hastings United and the Isthmian League ===
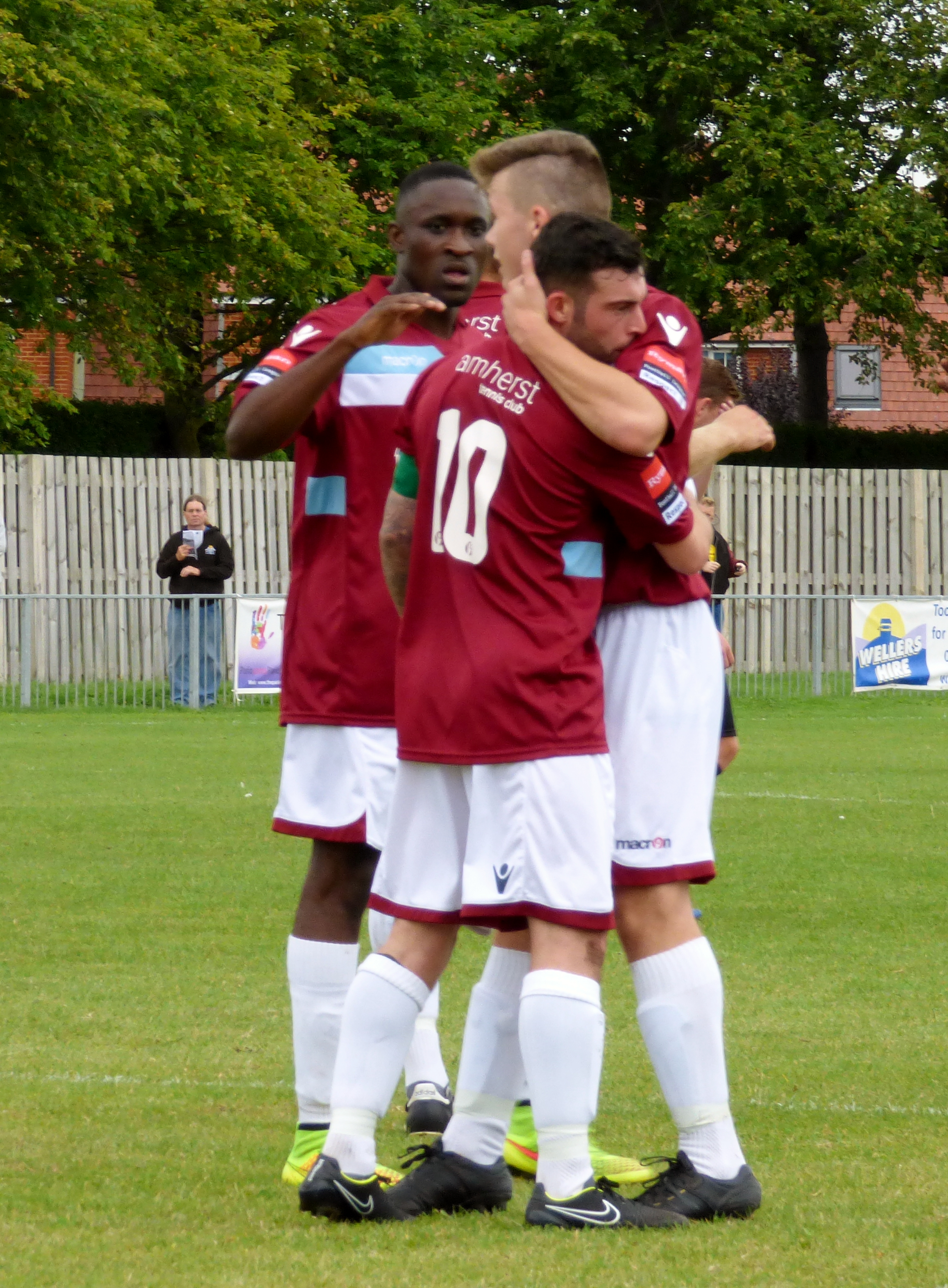
Hastings players celebrate scoring a goal

Hastings Town changed name to Hastings United ahead of the 2002–03 season, taking on the identity of the club formed in 1948. The club enjoyed a decent start to the season and reached the first round of the 2002–03 FA Cup; however the club saw a dip in form and were relegated back to the Eastern Division. The summer ahead of the 2003–04 season saw many changes at the club, with most of the squad leaving, losing many players to Eastbourne Borough and Folkestone Invicta; Dave Walters taking over as chairman and new manager Steve Lovell, having to build a squad that eventually escaped relegation to the county league.

Following the FA's restructure of the football league, the club joined Division One of the Isthmian League for the 2004–05 season. Neville Southall took over as manager in November 2004 following Lovell's resignation and consolidated their place in the league. However Southall's stay was short as he resigned during the 2005–06 season following disagreements with the chairman, seemingly starting the trend of short lived managerial stays for the following seasons.

Nigel Kane and Pat Brown took over from Southall, with the latter stepping down but later returning as goalkeeping coach. For the 2006–07 season, Kane's brother Norman was introduced as assistant manager, but the club seemed destined for another relegation battle, however a turn in form saw the club go on a remarkable run from November, finishing in the play-off places at fifth place. The side went onto beat Dover Athletic in the semi-finals and Tooting and Mitcham United in the final to win promotion to the Isthmian League Premier Division.

The club started off the 2007–08 season well; however a loss in form saw the side fall into the relegation places and the departure of Nigel Kane. His successor, Tony Dolby and assistant Mike Rutherford, were able to steer the club out of the relegation places, finishing in fourteenth place. However, shortly after the end of the season Dolby and Rutherford announced their departures from the club, with several key players also leaving. Former player and current reserve team manager John Lambert was promoted to first team manager, with Wayne Farrier as his assistant. Lambert only lasted until February 2009, when he was suddenly sacked and Tony Dolby returned as manager. Dolby built a strong side for the 2009–10 season and led the club to a seventh-place finish, just outside the play-off places, but after a disappointing run in the 2010–11 season, Dolby departed once more and Jason Hopkinson was brought in as his replacement. Hopkinson's stay at the club was disappointing and short-lived after he departed in November 2011 and replaced by Sean Ray.

=== FA Cup and relegation ===
Player/manager Sean Ray steered the club to safety in 2011–12 and led the club to its best ever performance in the 2012–13 FA Cup. The side beat Bishops Stortford in the first round, to set up a tie against Harrogate Town in the second round. The tie at Harrogate ended 1-1, setting up a replay at the Pilot Field which was televised live by ESPN Sports and witnessed in front of a sell-out crowd. Hastings won the game on penalties and set up an away tie against Middlesbrough in the third round, where the club were knocked out after losing 4–1 in the biggest match in the club's history.

Despite the remarkable cup run, the club's league form left them languishing near the relegation places and the club were eventually relegated after a three-and-a-half month winless streak. Ray departed shortly before the 2013–14 season and John Maggs was appointed in September 2013. Maggs only lasted five months and was replaced by Terry White, who took the club the play-offs, losing to Folkestone Invicta in the semi-final. White resigned in October 2014 and was replaced by Dominic di Paolo, who himself only lasted until News Years Day and was replaced by Nigel Kane.

=== New ownership and academy setup ===
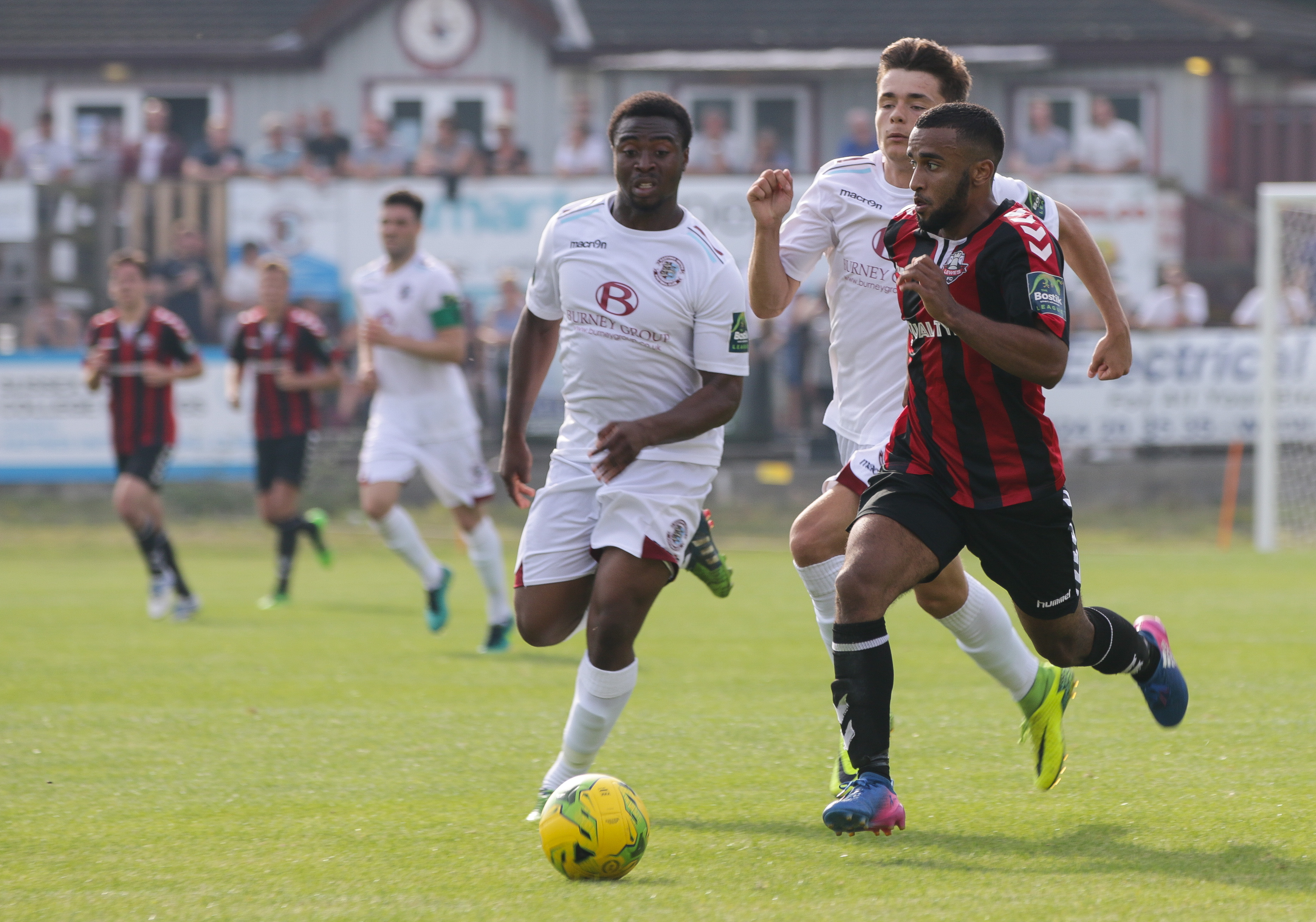
Hastings United (white kit) in action against Lewes

In April 2015 Dave Walters stepped down as club chairman, selling his majority shares to Dave Ormerod. A new board was quickly appointed and Garry Wilson was appointed manager for 2015–16, the club had ambitions to challenge for promotion, however the team ended up in a disappointing seventh place and Wilson resigned. Darren Hare signed a two-year deal to become manager from 2016–17 with Steven Watt as his assistant. Players with Football League experience such as Lenny Pidgeley, Matt Bodkin and Frannie Collin, who scored a record equalling 32 goals, joined the club. After a fifth-place finish in the league, the club lost in the play-off semi-finals to Dorking Wanderers and Hare departed as manager shortly after.

Former Brighton & Hove Albion player Adam Hinshelwood took over as manager, also signing a two-year deal, who alongside his assistant Chris Agutter, would work full-time at the club, also overseeing the academy setup. By now the club were investing a lot more time and resources into the academy side and development squad, with a view to bringing more young local players into the senior side. Hinshelwood left his role in September 2017 and was taken over by Agutter.

In 2019, club owners Daren Burney and Peter Sherlock appointed music agent Billy Wood as chief executive officer with David Nessling, Tony Cosens and David Ormerod departing the club by resignation. With the club under a new wave of momentum attendances rose to consistent levels not witnessed in decades with Chris Agutter's team closing in on the Isthmian South East League championship before COVID-19 sent the league into lockdown and eventually the league was terminated, null and voiding 2019/20. The 2021–22 season saw Hastings claim the league title and secure promotion to the Isthmian League Premier Division.

== Club identity ==
The club's nickname is officially "the U's" despite many believing it to be "the Arrows", which was briefly the official nickname in the early 2000s following a deal with Arrow FM and reflected the story of King Harold taking an arrow to the eye in the Battle of Hastings. The traditional colours of Hastings United are claret and blue, though ahead of 2017–18 season an all white kit, with claret and blue trim was introduced before reverting to claret ahead of the 2019–20 season.

The club's earliest known colours as Rock-a-Nore were blue and white, with the nickname the "Tanfrocks" or "the Rocks". When the club became Hastings & St Leonards their home kit was all white, with the nickname being the "Lilywhites" in reference to the kit or "the Stingers". By the 1930s the club colours were red and white, including a spell in red and white stripes and another spell spent playing in red, white and blue. After changing name to Hastings Town, the club reverted to all white home kits and their nickname become "the Town". Yellow and Blue kits were a common choice of away colours for Hastings Town, a trend which carried on after becoming Hastings United. Though in more recent years, the club have also used white away kits.

The club's former club crest was a variation of the Hastings coat of arms, the club started using the coat of arms in the 1990s with a more simplified version. A silhouette of a player kicking a football surrounded by the letters "HTFC" had previously been used and before that silhouette of Fir trees on a red and black background, reflecting the club colours and home ground at the Firs. In 2020 the club changed their crest to one of a poorly designed Lion, which they found on clip art, symbolising the three on the coat of arms coming together to show the bond between the staff, the players and the supporters. With the rebrand Hastings United went back to the traditional claret home strip.

Supporters groups were disappointed with the move away from the more classic crest design and many refused to purchase new shirts until the club went back to the previous crest.

== Stadium ==
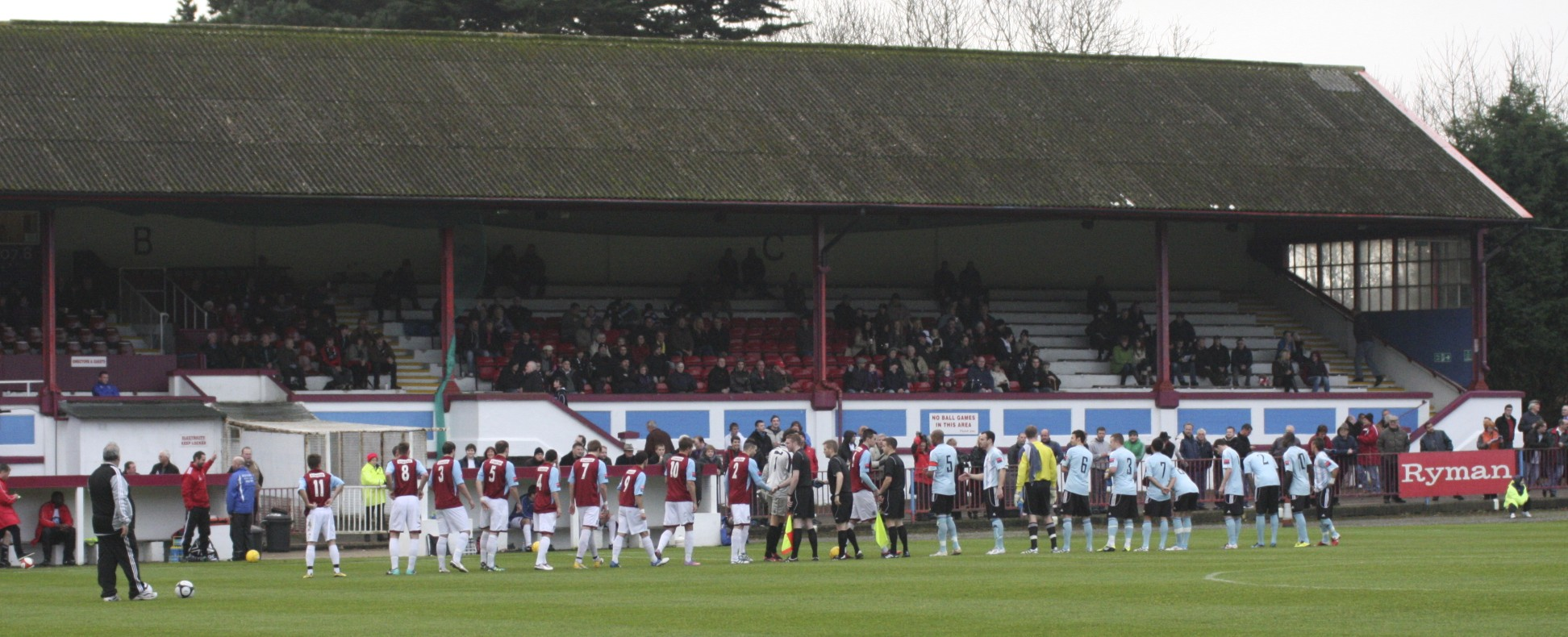
View of the main stand

Hastings United's home ground is the Pilot Field, where the club have been based since 1985 and was also their home between 1920, and 1948, with the original Hastings United using the ground between 1948 and 1985. Before the opening of the Pilot Field in 1920, the club had mostly used the East Hill as their home. The club had also spent a season playing at the "Sports Ground", located on what is now White Rock Gardens and also played home fixtures on the Central Recreation Ground throughout the 1890s and 1900s.

After initially moving to the Pilot Field, facilities were very basic, until the construction of the main stand which was officially opened in 1926, alongside fencing, toilets and parking facilities. The club were forced out in 1948 and after a short spell playing on basic public pitches, the club moved to the upper pitch of the Pilot Field, later known as "the Firs". Facilities at the Firs were sufficient for the club to enter the Sussex County League in 1952 and in the late 1970s the club temporarily moved to Bulverhythe, Hastings Rangers home pitch, whilst the pitch and clubhouse were upgraded.

In 1985 the club moved back to the Pilot Field, which since 1948 had seen the construction of two new stands behind one goal, floodlights and additional catering facilities. A new clubhouse was constructed near the main entrance in 1998 and further extended the following year, the "Cole Warren" stand was erected in 2005 at the far end of the ground and providing covered standing and seating on three sides of the ground.

=== New stadium ===
There had been proposals previously to give the Pilot Field a major upgrade which never came to fruition; however in 2007 the idea of building a new stadium was first mentioned by chairman, Dave Walters. Due to the increasing cost of ground maintenance, particularly on the main stand, Walters expressed an interest in building a new stadium as part of a new sports complex, funded by the selling of the Pilot Field and the neighbouring Firs ground, most of which lay derelict. However the plans never went any further than minimal contact between Hastings Borough Council and the football club.

In November 2016, it was revealed that the directors of Hastings United had been working with the trustees of Horntye Park and Sport England for 18 months on plans to build a new multimillion-pound sports complex named Combe Valley Sports Village. Located in Bulverhythe, used by many amateur teams in Hastings and Bexhill and next to the pitch Hastings Town used for a spell in the late 1970s, the complex would have been home to Hastings United, Hastings Priory Cricket Club and South Saxons Hockey Club. Proposed facilities included a 3,000 capacity stadium for Hastings United, 4g and grass football pitches, cricket pitches, Astroturf pitch and indoor sports complex. The complex would also have contained educational facilities for Sussex Coast College. It was proposed that the development be funded by housing developments built on land next to the complex at Bulverhythe, the Pilot Field and Horntye Park. However the scheme was dropped in 2018 after the housing developer backed out of the proposal.

The club had plans to move to a new sports complex named the Tilekiln Football Park located in Hollington, which would have seen the main stadium, two 3g pitches and a multi-use games area being constructed in phase one. A sports hall, gymnasium and additional facilities were to be constructed in phase two. In March 2022, Hastings Borough Council announced they would not proceed with the sale of the land to the football club and so the plan was terminated.

== Supporters ==
The Hastings United Independent Supporters Club runs fundraising events for club in the clubhouse and Sports and Social Club, such as regular quiz nights and parties. The club charges a membership fee to join and is run by a committee voted for by members.

The clubs average attendance has notably increased within recent seasons, rising from 485 for the 2018–19 season to 1,262 for the 2021–22 season. A new home league attendance record was set during the 2021–22 season for their fixture against Hayward Heath Town.

== Players ==
=== Current squad ===
As of 28 January 2024

Note: Flags indicate national team as defined under FIFA eligibility rules; some limited exceptions apply. Players may hold more than one non-FIFA nationality.

No.	Pos.	Nation	Player
1	GK	ENG	Harry Haines
2	DF	ENG	Matty Cassidy
3	DF	ENG	Archie Cassidy
4	MF	ENG	Robbie Dolan
5	MF	ENG	Sam Pidgeon
6	MF	ENG	Sam King ]]
7	FW	ENG	Tom Chambers Captain (association football)
8	MF	ENG	Ronnie Dolan
9	FW	ENG	Kesna Clarke
10	FW	ENG	Max Walsh

No.	Pos.	Nation	Player
11	MF	ENG	Freddie Legg
12	DF	ENG	Joe Clifford
13	DF	ENG	
14	FW	ENG	Warren Mfula
15	MF	ENG	Elijah Shute
16	MF	ENG	
17	FW	ENG	Ayo Olasimbo
18	DF	ENG	
19	DF	ENG	Sam Pidgeon
20	DF		Sam Adams

=== Former players ===
- For all Hastings United and Hastings Town players with a Wikipedia article see Category:Hastings United F.C. players.

== Management and other staff ==
As of 16 May 2026

Position	Name
First Team Manager	Ronnie Dolan
First Team Assistant Manager	Trevor McCreadie
First Team Coach	Sam Adams
Goalkeeper Coach	TBA
Performance Coach	Bobbi Deegan
Sports Therapist	TBA
Video Analyst	Joseph Knight
Academy Manager	Ben White
Women's First Team Manager	Lauren Skinner-Swain
Girls Academy Lead Coach	Georgia Townsend
Head of Football	Billy Wood

=== Former managers ===
- For all Hastings United and Hastings Town managers with a Wikipedia article see Category:Hastings United F.C. managers.

== Other teams ==
- Hastings United Development who compete in the Isthmian League Development (South) League
- Hastings United Under 18's who compete in the Isthmian League Youth (South) League
- Hastings United Women who compete in the London and South East Women's Regional Football League Division One South

Hastings United Disability Sussex Disability Football League Championship

The club also run an academy and field teams between under 7's and under 18's.

== Honours ==
=== League ===
- Southern League

Southern Division Champions (1): 1991–92
Eastern Division Champions (1): 2001–02

- Isthmian League

Division One South Play-Off Winners (1): 2006–07
South East Division Champions (1): 2021–22

- Sussex County League

Sussex County League Runners-Up (2): 1921–22, 1925–26
Division 2 Winners (1): 1979–80

- Southern Amateur League

Division One Champions (4): 1934–35, 1935–36, 1936–37, 1938–39
Division Two Champions (1): 1927–28

=== Cup ===
- Southern League Cup

Winners (1): 1994–95
Runners-up (1): 1996–97

- Sussex Senior Cup

Winners (4): 1935–36, 1937–38, 1995–96, 1997–98
Runners-up: 1932–33, 1934–35, 1939–40, 1945–46, 1985–86, 1998–99, 1999–00, 2023-24

- Sussex RUR Cup

Winners (1): 1938–39
Runners Up (7): 1907–08, 1924–25, 1926–27, 1939–40, 1946–47, 1979–80, 1982–83

- Amateur Football Alliance Senior Cup

Winners (1): 1937–38

== Records ==
- Record attendance: 4,888 vs Nottingham Forest, 1996
- League attendance: 3,082 vs Haywards Heath Town, 2022
- Transfer fee paid: £8,000 to Ashford Town, for Nicky Dent.
- Transfer fee received: £50,000 from Nottingham Forest, for Paul Smith.
- Most goals in a season: Davide Rodari (2023–24), 34
- Best FA Cup performance: Third round, 1953–54 (replay), 2012–13
- Best FA Trophy performance: Third round, 1979–80, 1980–81 (replay)
- Best FA Amateur Cup performance: Second round, 1972–73
