= Worthing Cricket Club =

Team information
- Established: March 1855; 170 years ago
- Home venue: Manor Sports Ground, Worthing

History
- Notable players: Arthur WF Somerset, Arthur PFC Somerset, Imran Khan, Paul Jarvis, Mason Crane

Worthing Cricket Club is a cricket club in the coastal town of Worthing in West Sussex, England. Founded in 1855, the club's first XI plays in the Sussex Cricket League which is the accredited ECB Premier League for Sussex and is the highest level for recreational club cricket in England and Wales. Its highest score is 228 by Renai Gransult at Manor Road, whilst Dominic Clapp holds the record for its 1st team with 200*.

== History ==
Founded in March 1855 at the Steyne Hotel (now the Chatsworth Hotel) in Worthing, under the patronage of Lord Henry Paget, Marquess of Anglesey, and Lord Alexander Paget. The club first played on Broadwater Green, then the Pavilion Road sports ground until its closure in 1937. The Manor ground then became the club's main cricket ground.

In the 19th century, Colonel Thomas F Wisden of Offington was president of the club. Arthur F Somerset of Castle Goring became captain, his son Arthur PFC Somerset (also of Castle Goring) both played for Sussex and toured the West Indies with the Marylebone Cricket Club.

The club was a founder member of the Sussex League, having been a member since its inception in 1971. In the 20th century, the club was able to attract such high-profile Test match players such as Pakistan captain Imran Khan and England fast bowler Paul Jarvis. Current Hampshire CCC and England leg break bowler Mason Crane was a member of Worthing CC from the age of 10 and played in junior and senior teams, taking 54 wickets for the first XI until county duties with Hampshire took hold of his playing career.

The club's only major honour to date was winning the Sussex League Cup in 1992 under the captaincy of Tim Dunn, who was the Club Chairman.

== Teams ==
- 1st XI Sussex Cricket League Division 2
- 2nd XI Sussex Cricket League Division 5 West
- 3rd XI Sussex Cricket League Division 10 West (South)
- 4th XI Sussex Cricket League Division 11 West (South)

== The club today ==
From 2008 to 2010, the club's first XI was captained by former Sussex, Hampshire and Kent batsman Dominic Clapp. The club appointed Michael Gould as its first XI captain for 2011. Michael is the son of former England, Middlesex, Sussex and Auckland wicket-keeper, Ian Gould, who is now on the Elite Panel of ICC Umpires. The current club captain from 2021 is Harry Dunn and the current chairman is Dominic Clapp. The club has a strong junior section and has England and Wales Cricket Board Clubmark status. The club runs four senior teams in league cricket on a Saturday as well as a Sunday XI.

In 2011 the club won Division 2 of the Sussex Cricket League, and were promoted to the Premier league of the Sussex Cricket league; however, they were then relegated in 2013.

In 2022 the club won Division 3 West, of the Sussex Cricket League, they are now back in Division 2 aspiring for Premier Division Cricket.

== Honours ==
- Sussex Cricket League Division 2
  - Champions 2011 & 2015
- Sussex League Cup
  - Winners 1992

== See also ==
- Sport in Worthing
