= Littlehampton, Clapham and Patching Cricket Club =

English cricket club in Littlehampton, West Sussex

The Littlehampton, Clapham and Patching Cricket Club is a cricket club in Littlehampton, West Sussex, England.

The earliest record of cricket in Littlehampton was of a game on 2 July 1802 on the Littlehampton Green when a match between the Gentlemen of Sussex and the Storrington Club was played. On 3 June 1813 a team from Littlehampton played a team from Lancing and in 1816 the residents played a visitors’ side. By the end of the 1860s an occasional cricket ground was on the Common immediately south of the Roman Catholic Church, where there was ‘a level plateau of perfectly natural formation’, known locally as “The Cow Ground”.

== General ==
The Littlehampton, Clapham & Patching Cricket Club is a member of the Sussex Cricket League, which administers the Sussex Premier League. After being relegated in 2012 they spent four years in the West Sussex Invitation League. In 2017 the 1st XI won Division 1 on the last day of the season against rivals Arundel CC to gain promotion back into the Sussex Cricket League. There are Sunday XI’s that play friendly cricket.

Recently after a period of consolidation LC&PCC has begun gain success. In 2016 the 1st XI won the West Sussex Invitation Cricket League T20 Competition. Also in 2016 the 3rd XI won division 7 on last day of the season backing up their title of division 8 in 2014, while the 2nd XI won the West Sussex Invitation League Division 6 in 2015. Off the field the club were awarded a grant in 2015, to redevelop the Old Pavilion which has now been renamed The Somerset Pavilion.

The Club also entertain a number of mid-week touring sides.

The former Littlehampton Cricket Club won the Sussex Championship League in 1975 and 1977 and was the runner-up in 1976. After this success the Club was accepted into the Sussex Cricket League in 1978. The Club won the Sussex League Cup in 1989 and was the runner-up in 1984. The 1st XI was the League runner-up in 1991 and the 2nd XI achieved this distinction in 1977. In 2003 the 2nd XI won the Division 1 of 2nd XIs and secured promotion. The 1st XI was promoted at the end of the 2004 season.

The former Clapham and Patching Cricket Club was the runner-up in Division 2 of the Sussex Championship League in 1993 and was also the runner-up in the Sussex Championship League Cup in the same year.

In addition, the Club plays in the Worthing and District Knock Out Cup – an evening competition and has been the winner of this Cup on several occasions. The Club has also entered six-a-side teams in the Worthing and Bognor Regis indoor cricket competitions. The Club is the most successful local side by far in these indoor contests and has numerous trophy wins over the past thirty years.

During the 2005 season the club secured the services of Chris Cooke as their overseas player who later signed a contract with Glamorgan CCC.

== Formation of the Club ==
The first record of the formation of a Littlehampton Cricket Club came from the West Sussex Gazette of 29 September 1859 when it was reported – “This is the first season of the Littlehamptonites forming a cricket club, they have played eight matches.” However, there were few reports of subsequent matches, which indicated that the Club had ceased to exist by 1866.

== Reformation of the Club ==
On 15 December 1870 the same paper reported that cricket enthusiasts had got together to form a cricket club for 1871 under the presidency of the Reverend W. B. Philpott. The Duke of Norfolk favourably received an application for the cricket ground on the Common to be permanently established.

In 1873 notice was received from the Duke of Norfolk’s Arundel Estate Office that the cricket pitch on the Common would no longer be available. Arrangements were made in 1875, with the Duke, to rent a field of six acres (2.4 hectares) at the rear of Selborne Road.

== Cricket at the Sportsfield ==
The West Sussex Gazette reported on 20 May 1897

“The Duke of Norfolk has just offered the town the waterworks field as a gift in commemoration of Her Majesty’s reign, to be used as a public recreation and pleasure ground. As it is proposed the present cricket ground (Selborne Road) will before very long be required for building purposes, the acquisition of the new ground will be greatly appreciated.”

The 200 year Sportsfield lease stated – “The Duke has decided to substitute another Field for the said Cricket Field and to vest the same in Trustees for the purpose of Cricket, Football and other sports.” At a meeting in February 1898 it was proposed that the Littlehampton Cricket Club, the Littlehampton Association Football Club, the Littlehampton Swifts Football Club and the Littlehampton Athletic and Cycling Sports Club use the ground.

The ground was prepared for sports with fencing and a pavilion provided in time for the 1900 cricket season. The official opening of the ground was performed by Lady Mary Howard, sister of the Duke of Norfolk, and was commemorated with a two-day cricket match between the Gentlemen of Sussex and the Players of Sussex. The game was drawn.

In 1939 the Littlehampton Gazette reported that the Duke of Norfolk “has decided that the general interest and progress of the town can best be served by the transfer of ownership to those who can give undivided attention to it and are able to carry out expansion on the best lines”. The Sportsfield formed part of the estate of the Duke. In 1940 the sale was confirmed with a private trust company.

Early, in 1962, after previously changing hands a number of times, the Sportsfield was conveyed to Ortem Estates Limited as part of a transaction involving the acquisition of the Beaumont Estate for residential development. On 29 March 1962 the freehold was sold on to Trustees appointed by the Littlehampton Cricket Club for the sum of £10. The West Sussex Gazette reported – “Littlehampton Cricket Club has bought the freehold of the Sportsfield and so ensured that the ground will remain the town’s sports’ centre for all times.” The successor Trustees, appointed in accordance with the terms of the original lease in 1894, were not affected by the purchase. They would continue to be responsible for the administration and maintenance of the ground until the lease terminated in the year 2087 unless the Sportsfield Trustees decided that they could not run the ground. In that case the control of the Sportsfield would be passed to the Cricket Club.

== Cricket in Clapham and Patching ==
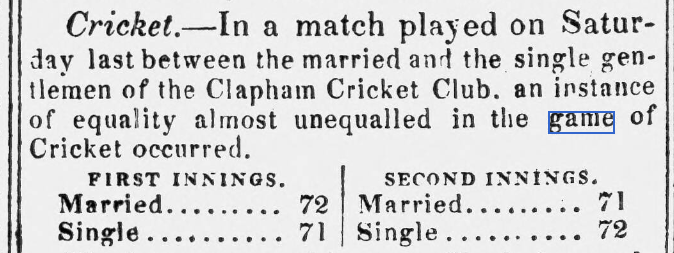
Result of a cricket match played on Saturday 8 July 1820, between the married and single members of Clapham Cricket Club.

The first reference relating to cricket being played by Patching was reported in the Sussex Weekly Advertiser on 22 July 1771 when Hurst played Patching and Portslade at Hurstpierpoint. Clapham and Patching were the runners-up in the Nind Challenge Trophy in 1897. The trophy had been presented by Mr. P.W.Nind for the East Preston Cricket League. Clapham and Patching Cricket Club remained a difficult side to beat into the early 1900s. In 1914 the Club played in the six-a-side Blauw Tournament at East Preston when the performances of Arthur William Fitzroy Somerset and Arthur Plantaganet Francis Cecil Somerset brought about a win for Clapham and Patching. The organisers took exception to this and the Competition was not repeated again for over half a Century.

In the 1930s the Club, which was then known as Patching and Clapham Cricket Club, was linked with the former Durrington Cricket Club and played on a pitch behind the Coach and Horses and used a Southdown Coach as a pavilion. During the course of the Second World War the pitch at Frog’s Hole, Clapham deteriorated into an overgrown field and it took two weeks to relocate the cricket square. The Club constructed a hut to use as a pavilion and this existed until 1978 when the Village Hall was constructed. The freehold of the Ground was owned by the Duke of Norfolk’s Estate and when offered to the Club for £11,000 in 1974 the Chairman rejected the offer without consulting the Club Committee. The Village Hall Management Committee purchased the ground with a covenant that safeguarded the future of cricket at Frog’s Hole in perpetuity.

The village pitch name, Frog's Hole, relates to the large number of frogs that inhabited the wet surroundings. Some romantics have erroneously suggested that the name derives from a nearby prisoner of war camp that existed for the French soldiers during the Napoleonic Wars.

== Club Merging ==
In 1999, the Clapham and Patching Cricket Club merged with the Littlehampton Club which not only secured the future of the village Club but also enabled the new Club to field a 4th XI on Saturdays and consistently to field two Sunday XIs.
