= Sport in Worthing =

A wide variety of sport in Worthing has been played, which has a long and interesting history.

== Current sports ==
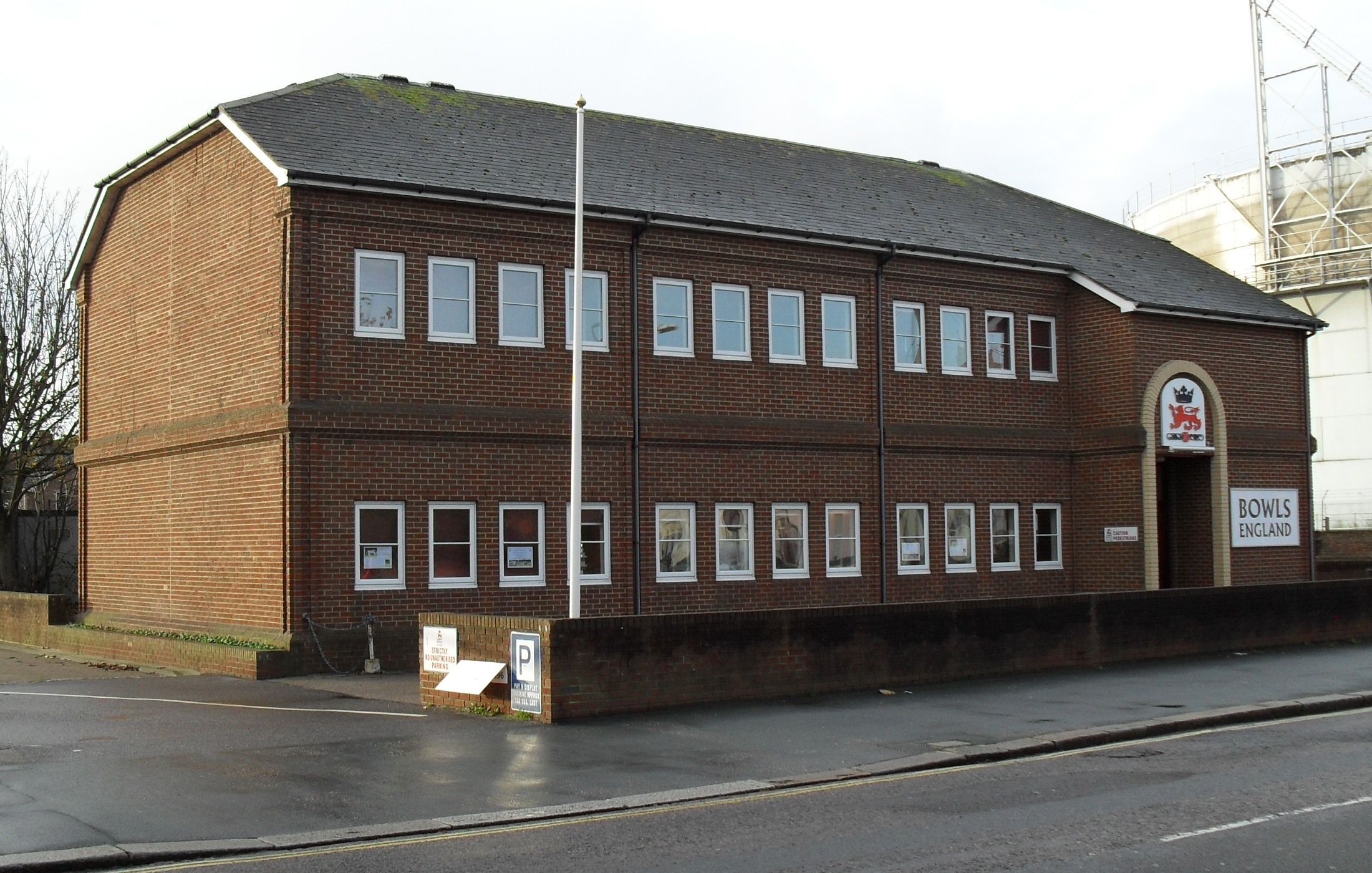
Bowls England previously had their headquarters in Worthing.

Worthing's location between the sea and the downs makes the area a popular location for outdoor recreation. The town's five miles of coastline and its wide open water makes it a popular location for watersports, especially catamaran racing, windsurfing and kitesurfing and the town has held a regatta for rowing since at least 1859. The South Downs is popular for hiking and mountain-biking, with around 22 trail-heads within the borough. The Downs is also the location for the Three Forts Marathon, a 27-mile ultramarathon from Broadwater to the three Iron Age hill forts of Cissbury Ring, Chanctonbury Ring and Devil's Dyke. The Downs is also home to two of Worthing's three golf clubs, including Worthing Golf Club.

Previously home to Bowls England, Worthing is, with Johannesburg, one of only two locations in the world to have hosted the men's World Bowls Championships twice. The five international standard bowling greens at Beach House Park, which is sometimes known as the spiritual home of bowls, was the venue for the National Championships each August until 2013.

A range of motorsports, including stock car racing, banger racing and go-kart racing take place at the Oval Raceway in the outlying village of Angmering. Founded in 2001, Worthing is home to a self-funded wrestling organisation called the Just Wrestling Foundation (JWF), which is currently based at St Richard's Church Hall in Durrington. Worthing has also been a mainstay for wrestling promoter John Freemantle and his Premier Promotions wrestling bouts, held for several years at both the Worthing Pavilion and the Assembly Hall.

== Sports teams ==
The main sports teams representing Worthing are shown below:

Name	Nickname	Sport	League	Home	Founded
Worthing Cricket Club		Cricket	Sussex Premier League	Manor Sports Ground	1855
Worthing Football Club	The Rebels	Football	National League South	Woodside Road	1886
Worthing Hockey Club		Field hockey	Kent/Sussex Div 1	Angmering School	1896
Worthing Rugby Football Club	Raiders	Rugby union	National League 1	Roundstone Lane, Angmering	1920
Worthing United Football Club	The Mavericks	Football	Sussex County League Division 1	Robert Albon Memorial Ground	1988
Worthing Thunder	Thunder	Basketball	English Basketball League	Worthing Leisure Centre	1999
Worthing Swimming Club	W.S.C.	Swimming	Sussex League/ Speedo League	Splashpoint, Worthing	1890
Worthing S.C. Water Polo	Green & Black	Water polo	B.W.P.L./ Sussex League/ South East Regional Trophy	Splashpoint, Worthing	1890

== History ==
=== 18th century ===
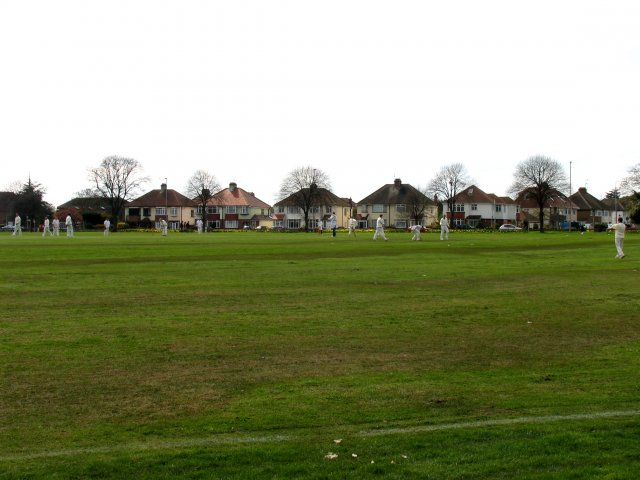
Cricket has been played at Broadwater Green since at least the 1720s

The first recorded sport in Worthing was cricket, which is recorded as having been played on Broadwater Green in the 1720s. Broadwater Cricket Club was the first club to be formed in the modern borough of Worthing. Founded in 1771, the club's first game was also in 1771 when they built Henfield by 30 notches to 15.

=== 19th century ===
Cricket continued to be the area's main sport in the 19th century, although other sports soon grew in popularity. In 1837 Broadwater hosted a match on Broadwater Green between a Sussex XI and an England XI. As the town of Worthing grew separately from Broadwater in the 19th century, Worthing Cricket Club was formed in 1855, Goring Cricket Club in 1877 and Chippingdale Cricket Club in 1897.

In the 19th century horse racing took place along the sands and at Ladies Mile (now Grand Avenue) in West Worthing. A regatta was first recorded in 1849 and a Worthing Regatta Committee was formed in 1859. Annual races have been held since, including the race in 1894 when Oscar Wilde presented the awards. In the early 19th century archery took place at the Liverpool Terrace pleasure gardens and also at the Anchor Inn Public House, now renamed, . By 1861 a Worthing Archery Club was using Steyne Gardens. A Worthing Cycling Club existed by 1882, which was in 1887 superseded by the Worthing Working Men's Excelsior Cycling Club (now the Worthing Excelsior Cycling Club).

The Scarlet Runners were Worthing's first rugby club, who were in existence by 1883, changing their name to Worthing Football Club (RU) shortly afterwards. Together with Brighton and Hastings they were founder members of the Sussex Rugby Football Union. The club folded in 1895.

1886 proved to be a particularly significant year for sport in the town. Worthing's main football club was formed in this year as Worthing AFC (later renamed Worthing FC). Also in 1886, the West Worthing Club opened at Downview Road, West Worthing with tennis and croquet grounds for the new town of West Worthing.

Worthing Swimming Club formed in 1890 at the YMCA Rooms in Warwick Street, with swimming taking place in the sea and at West Worthing Baths (formerly the site of MGM Assurance in Heene Road). In 1898 the club's water polo team appeared in one of the Britain's earliest films. This was one of a number of films made by pioneer William Kennedy Dickson on a visit to Worthing. Also in the 1890s, Worthing got its first bowling green, in Homefield Park.

Worthing Hockey Club formed in 1896 and in 1899 were one of seven founder members of the Sussex County Hockey Association forum.

=== 20th century ===
Worthing FC were founder members of the Sussex County Football League, winning the inaugural title in 1920, and a further seven championships before joining the Corinthian League in 1948, the Athenian League in 1963 and then the Isthmian League in 1977. In 1921, John Chillam founded the Worthing and District Football League as a section of the Brighton League. The Worthing League became independent in 1922.

In 1920, Worthing Rugby Football Club were formed at York House in the town, while in 1921, Worthing's main athletics club, the Worthing Harriers, were formed.

In 1932, Worthing’s International Easter Hockey Festival started when 11 teams participated, including Old Cranleighans, Beckenham, Brighton and Trojans, later increasing to over 50 teams. The festival moved to the Manor Sports Ground in 1939. The Manor Sports Ground, also the home of Worthing Cricket Club, was used for an annual County Championship match for Sussex between 1935 and 1964.

In 1969 Worthing hosted the start of the opening stage of cycling's Milk Race (now the Tour of Britain). Starting at Montague Place, this stage of the race ran along the seafront and on to Swindon, a distance of 164 km. The success of the event was overshadowed by the death of Zdeněk Kramoliš, a cyclist from the Czechoslovakia team, who collided with a lorry. This stage was won by the Polish rider, Kazimierz Jasiński.

In 1969, 1970 and 1974 Worthing's Hill Barn Golf Club on the South Downs played host to the Penfold Tournament, part of the European Tour. Gordon Caygill won the 1969 tournament and Ryder Cup captain Bernard Hunt won the 1970 tournament.

In 1972, Beach House Park in Worthing hosted its first World Bowls Championships, with people from 16 countries competing. Welshman Maldwyn Evans won the Singles championship, while the England team won the Fours. Twenty years later, in 1992, Worthing again hosted the World Bowls Championships, this time with people from 28 countries competing. The 1992 Singles event was won by Tony Allcock, who as of 2011 was the Chief Executive of Bowls England, also based in Worthing. The Fours was won by the team representing Scotland.

In 1974 the West Worthing tennis club moved to a new site in Titnore Lane and its grounds in West Worthing were sold and demolished. In 1982 Dr John Bull of Worthing Hospital started the town's annual Boxing Day charity sea swim, which typically takes place at Splash Point. From 1984 to 1987 the Worthing Marathon was held, and was repeated in 1990 to celebrate the borough's centenary. The Brighton Bears basketball club moved to Worthing in 1984 and as the Worthing Bears played in UK basketball's top league. They won the NBL Division One in 1987/88 and won the British Basketball League Championship in 1992/93. They also won the National Cup in 1993/94. When the Bears returned to Brighton in 1999, Worthing basketball fans established the Worthing Rebels, now Worthing Thunder.

=== 21st century ===
The Worthing Triathlon started in 2004, and is a standard distance triathlon involving a 1.5 km sea swim, 41 km undulating bike and 10 km promenade run, with the option of a Relay Triathlon for novices or those injured. In 2010 the first Birdman swimming race took place near Worthing Pier, with 2 km and 1 km races. The event takes place before the Worthing Birdman event which moved to the town in 2008. In basketball, the Worthing Thunder won back-to-back titles in the English Basketball League in 2006 and 2007. In 2008 Thunder returned to the British Basketball League, bringing top-flight basketball back to Worthing for the first time since 1999.

Worthing's first major kitesurfing event, the Big Air Open Kitesurfing Classic will take place on 14 July 2012 as part of the 2012 Olympic Torch Relay weekend in the town.

In August 2012, the new cyclosportive known as The Devil in the Downs will take place, forming part of Worthing Excelsior Cycling Club 125th anniversary celebrations. Made up of three events, there will be a ride of 125 km (78 mi) known as the Devil in the Downs, a ride of 85 km (53 mi) known as the Little Devil and a ride of 50 km (31 mi), known as the Little Imp. The event replaces Worthing's first sportive, known as the Worthing 125, which had courses of 125 miles and 125 km.

== Famous sportsmen ==
Peter Bonetti and Eric Parsons and Harrison Reed (football), Donald Smith, Arthur Somerset, Neil Lenham and Jason Lewry (cricket), Martin Lee (tennis), David Evans and David Leadbetter (golf), Angela Barnwell (freestyle swimming), David Bryant (bowls), Lisa John (ten-pin bowling), Byron Dafoe (ice hockey), Lewis Crathern (kitesurfing), Alan Warren (sailing).

== Facilities ==
Facilities include the Manor Sports Ground for cricket, Woodside Road for football, Beach House Park for bowls, Worthing Golf Club and Hill Barn Golf Club for golf, and Homefield Park Skatepark for skateboarding and BMX.

== See also ==
- Sport in Sussex

== Bibliography ==
- Elleray, D. Robert (1998). A Millennium Encyclopaedia of Worthing History. Worthing: Optimus Books. ISBN 0-9533132-0-4.
