= Will House (cricketer) =

English cricketer

Personal information
- Full name: William John House
- Born: 16 March 1976 (age 50); Sheffield, South Yorkshire
- Batting: Left-handed
- Bowling: Right-arm medium
- Role: All-rounder

Domestic team information
- Years: Team
- 1996–1998: Cambridge University
- 1996–1999: Kent
- 2000–2002: Sussex
- FC debut: 17 April 1996 Cambridge University v Glamorgan
- Last FC: 6 June 2001 Sussex v Worcestershire
- LA debut: 19 May 1996 British Universities v Middlesex
- Last LA: 3 September 2002 Sussex v Hampshire

Career statistics
Competition	First-class	List A
Matches	37	97
Runs scored	1,443	1,501
Batting average	29.44	20.01
100s/50s	2/8	0
Top score	136	3
Balls bowled	1,463	1,091
Wickets	4	31
Bowling average	241.00	30.06
5 wickets in innings	0	1
10 wickets in match	0	0
Best bowling	1/34	5/58
Catches/stumpings	21/–	22/–
- Source: CricInfo, 12 November 2017

William John House (born 16 March 1976) is an English former professional cricketer. In 1993, three years before the start of his first-class career, House won "The Cricket Society Wetherall Award for the Leading All-rounder in English Schools Cricket". He was born in Sheffield in South Yorkshire.

House started his first-class cricket career playing for Cambridge University. After making his first-class debut in April 1996 against Glamorgan in a university match he won his Blue later the same season in the University Match against Oxford. He played for the university team for three years, making a total of 22 first-class appearances for the team. He played List A cricket regularly for the British Universities team in the 1997 and 1998 Benson & Hedges cup competitions and played one first-class match for the team.

Having first played for the Second XI in 1994, he made his First XI debut for Kent County Cricket Club in the 1996 AXA Equity & Law League, playing four times for the team. In 1997 he made his County Championship debut against Essex in August before appearing for the county against the touring Australians later in the same month. A further Championship appearance followed in 1998 and in 1999 he played in one first-class match against his old University at the beginning of the season and regularly for the Kent List A team.

He was selected by MCC to go on their tour of Bangladesh in January 2000 and at the beginning of the 2000 season House moved to Sussex County Cricket Club. He was a more regular member of the Sussex team for two seasons, especially in List A competitions, playing in nine first-class and 64 List A matches for the county before he retired from professional cricket in September 2002 and took a job in the financial services industry in London.

House played a total of 37 first-class and 97 List A matches in his career, generally as an upper-middle order batsman. In club cricket he appeared for Sevenoaks Vine in Kent and Horsham Cricket Club. He has continued playing cricket for amateur teams such as MCC since his retirement from the professional game.
