= East Grinstead Cricket Club =

English cricket club

Team information
- Established: 1857; 169 years ago
- Home venue: East Grinstead Sports Club, Saint Hill Road, East Grinstead

History
- No. of titles: 1 (SCL 2017)
- Notable players: Will Adkin, Lewis Hatchett, Fynn Hudson-Prentice

East Grinstead Cricket Club is a cricket club based in East Grinstead, in Sussex, England. The club was founded in 1857 and won its first Sussex Cricket League title in 2017.

== History ==
There is a record of an East Grinstead team in 1731. On Monday, 12 July of that year, "the gamesters of East Grinstead" played a match against Surrey at Smitham Bottom, near Croydon. The stakes were 40 guineas a side, and East Grinstead won by four wickets.

East Grinstead Cricket Club was founded in 1857. In 1989, the East Grinstead Cricket Club merged with nearby East Grinstead Hockey Club to create East Grinstead Sports Club Limited. Following the merger the club sold the cricket ground and moved to the site of the hockey club, which owned its own land. Money from the sale was spent on a new pavilion, a new cricket square and an artificial sand pitch (used for hockey). In 2017, the club won the Sussex Cricket League for the first time and reached the semi-finals of the National Club Championship, having beaten Bath in the quarter-finals.

== Honours ==
1st XI

- Sussex Cricket League Premier Division
  - Champions 2017

== Bibliography ==
- ACS (1981). A Guide to Important Cricket Matches Played in the British Isles 1709–1863. Nottingham: ACS. OCLC 85045528.
- Waghorn, H. T. (2005) [1906]. The Dawn of Cricket. London: J. W. McKenzie. ISBN 978-09-47821-17-3.
