= Roffey Cricket Club =

Cricket club in West Sussex, England

Team information
- Established: 1904; 121 years ago
- Home venue: Innes Memorial Ground, Roffey

History
- No. of titles: 6
- Sussex Cricket League title wins: 2014, 2015, 2016, 2018, 2019, 2022

Roffey Cricket Club is a cricket club based in the Roffey suburb of the town of Horsham in West Sussex, England. Founded in 1904, the club's first XI plays in the Premier League of the Sussex Cricket League which is an accredited ECB Premier League, the highest level of recreational club cricket in England and Wales.

The First XI have won the Sussex Premier League 6 times out of the last ten seasons (2014, 2015, 2016, 2018, 2019 & 2022) and were second in 2017. They were unbeaten in the league in the 2019 season.

In addition, the Second XI were Division III champions and have been promoted to Division II for the 2025 season, the highest Division available to them. The Third XI were Division VIII champions and have been promoted to Division VII for the 2020 season.

== History ==
The first known cricket match arranged under the name of Roffey was played in May 1901 against Barns Green. Occasional matches were held during the next three years until Roffey Cricket Club was formed in 1904. The inaugural meeting was held in the Norfolk Arms public house in Roffey, chaired by W. Barnham. In 1932 the 3.3 acre cricket field was left in trust to the people of Roffey in memory of Colonel Innes and the ground officially became the Innes Memorial Ground.

In the mid 1970s Roffey joined the Arun Valley League, which the club went on to win five times before leaving in 1996 to participate in the Sussex Invitation League. In 2001, Roffey were invited to join the Sussex Cricket League.

== Honours ==
1st XI

- Sussex Cricket League Premier Division
  - Champions 2014, 2015, 2016, 2018, 2019

== See also ==
- Horsham Cricket Club, the other prominent cricket club in Horsham
