= Shaun Humphries =

English cricketer (born 1973)

Personal information
- Full name: Shaun Humphries
- Born: 11 January 1973 (age 53); Horsham, Sussex, England
- Batting: Right-handed
- Role: Wicket-keeper

Domestic team information
- Years: Team
- 1993–2000: Sussex

Career statistics
| Competition | First-class | List A |
|---|---|---|
| Matches | 31 | 33 |
| Runs scored | 555 | 85 |
| Batting average | 13.21 | 6.53 |
| 100s/50s | –/2 | –/– |
| Top score | 66 | 16 |
| Balls bowled | – | – |
| Wickets | – | – |
| Bowling average | – | – |
| 5 wickets in innings | – | – |
| 10 wickets in match | – | – |
| Best bowling | – | – |
| Catches/stumpings | 56/3 | 21/13 |
- Source: Cricinfo, 13 March 2012

Shaun Humphries (born 11 January 1973) is a former English cricketer. Humphries was a right-handed batsman who fielded as a wicket-keeper. He was born at Horsham, Sussex.

Humphries made his first-class debut for Sussex against Cambridge University in 1993. Due to the presence of regular wicket-keeper Peter Moores in the Sussex side, which limited his appearances for Sussex, it wasn't until 1996 that Humphries next featured for the county against Cambridge University. Two further first-class appearances followed in 1997, against Oxford University and Pakistan A. Following the retirement of Moores early in the 1998 season, Humphries featured extensively in both the 1998 and 1999 County Championship's. However, with Nicholas Wilton seen as a superior batsman to Humphries, this meant that he featured in just two first-class matches in 2000, against Warwickshire and New Zealand A. In total, he made 31 first-class appearances for Sussex, scoring 555 runs at an average of 13.21, with a high score of 66. This score was one of two half centuries he made and came against Kent in 1998. Behind the stumps he took 56 catches and made 3 stumpings.

Humphries made his debut in List A cricket for the county in 1998, against Glamorgan in the Benson & Hedges Cup. He made 32 further List A appearances for the county, the last of which came against Gloucestershire in the 2000 Benson & Hedges Cup. In his 33 List A appearances for the county, he scored a total of 85 runs at an average of 6.53, with a high score of 16. Behind the stumps he took 21 catches and made 13 stumpings. He left Sussex at the end of the 2000 season.
