= Horntye Park Sports Complex =

Sports venue in Hastings, East Sussex, England

Horntye Park
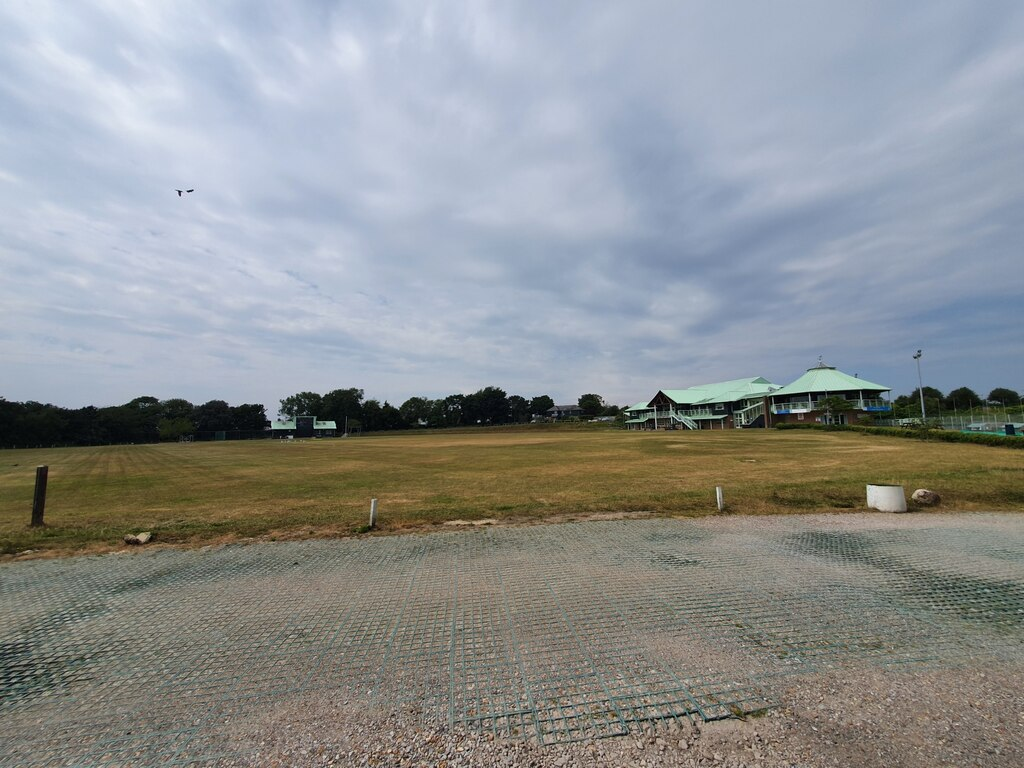

Ground information
- Location: Hastings, East Sussex
- Coordinates: 50.8610°N 0.5640°E
- Home club: Hastings and St Leonards Priory Cricket Club
- County club: Sussex
- Establishment: 1996
- Last used: 4 September 2021

Team information
Hastings Priory	(1996–2021)
Sussex	(2000–2001)
Sussex Cricket Board	(2000–2001)
- As of 17 December 2018; Source: Ground profile

Horntye Park Sports Complex is a sports and conference centre in Hastings, East Sussex, England. Primarily known as a cricket ground, the venue also contains a large indoor sports hall, an all-weather pitch used for football and hockey and a series of rooms used for meetings, conferences and weddings. The venue is the former home ground of Hastings & St. Leonards Priory Cricket Club and currently home to South Saxons Hockey Club.

Horntye Park became the towns' premier cricket ground in 1996 due to the development of Priory Meadow Shopping Centre on the Central Recreation Ground which forced Hastings Priory to move here. The site has been used for sport since the 1880s, primarily for football and was turned into allotments following its purchase by the Hastings Corporation in 1919. The site had been considered as a location for a new community sports ground in 1920 alongside The Pilot Field, with the latter being chosen. In 1982, Hastings Council voted to relocate the Central Recreation Ground to Horntye, then known as Summerfields, and use the ground's current location for a shopping centre with demolition work on the cricket ground and facilities starting in 1996.

Temporary facilities were erected at Horntye before the main pavilion was opened in 2000, later that year Sussex played their first game here in a warm up game against Zimbabwe. Sussex played two more fixtures at the ground in 2001 and were due to return on 26 May 2008 for a Friends Provident Trophy match against Essex. It was to have been the first Sussex match there for eight years. The match was abandoned without any play due to 'torrential rain'.

In November 2016, it was revealed that the directors of Hastings United had been working with the trustees of Horntye Park and Sport England for 18 months on plans to build a new multimillion-pound sports complex named Combe Valley Sports Village. Located in Bulverhythe, used by many amateur teams in Hastings and Bexhill, the complex would have been home to Hastings United, Hastings Priory and South Saxons Hockey Club. Proposed facilities included a 3,000 capacity stadium for Hastings United, 4g and grass football pitches, cricket pitches, Astroturf pitch and indoor sports complex. The complex would also have contained educational facilities for Sussex Coast College. It was proposed that the development be funded by housing developments built on land next to the complex at Bulverhythe, the Pilot Field and Horntye Park. However the scheme was dropped in 2018 after the housing developer backed out of the proposal.

The trustees of Horntye later announced plans to move both the cricket and hockey clubs to new facilities at Claremont School, which would be funded by the sale of Horntye Park to developers. The cricket club played their last game at the venue on 4 September 2021, whilst the hockey club still play their home fixtures here.
