= Manor Sports Ground =

Cricket ground in Worthing, West Sussex, England

Coordinates: 50.825335°N 0.371282°W

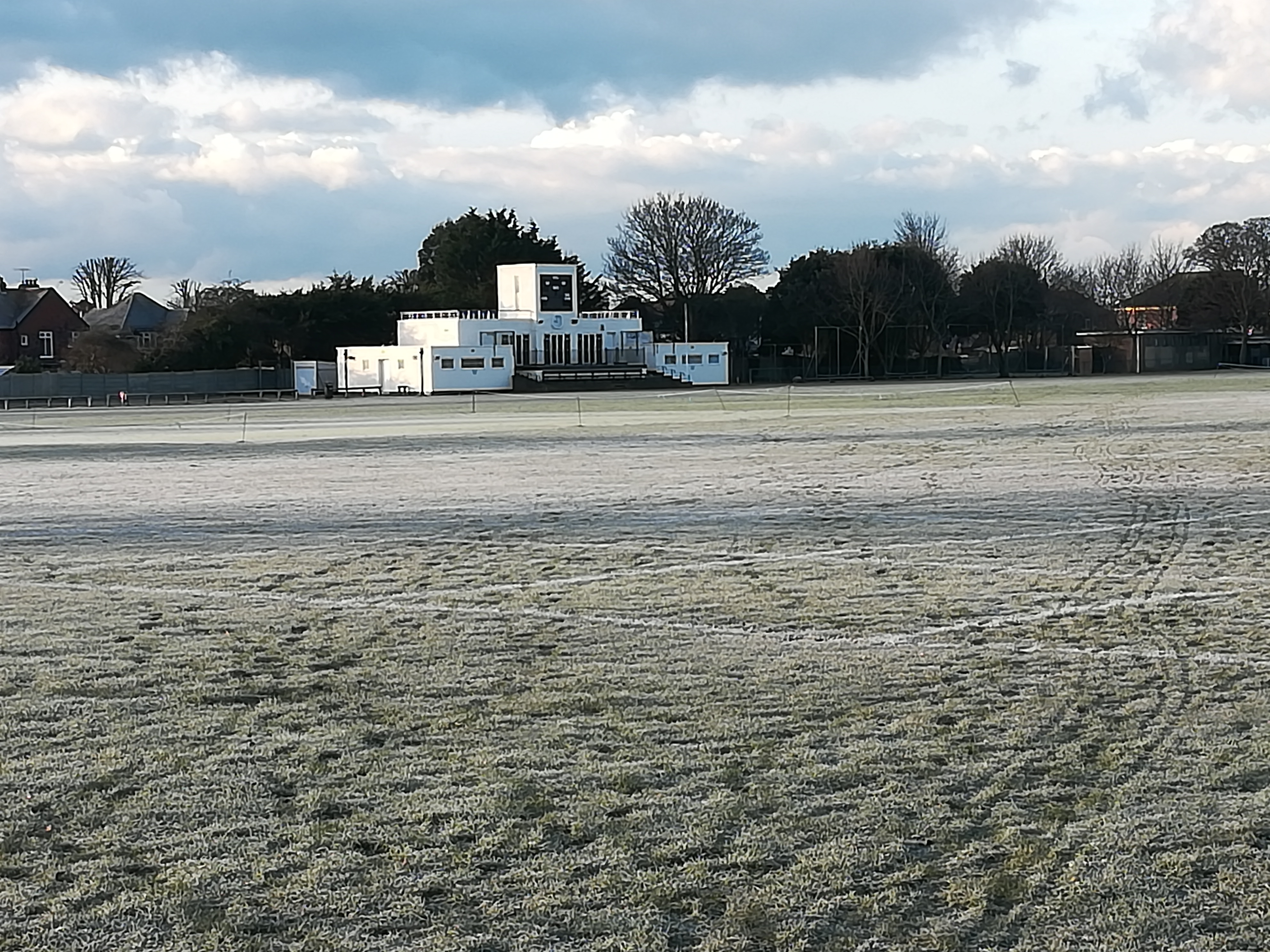
- Interactive map of Manor Sports Ground

Ground information
- Location: Worthing, West Sussex
- Country: England
- Establishment: 1902

Team information
Worthing Cricket Club	(1902 – present)
Sussex County Cricket Club	(1935–1964)
- As of 13 January 2010; Source: CricketArchive

The Manor Sports Ground, is a cricket venue in Worthing, West Sussex, England. It is home to Worthing Cricket Club.

== History ==
One of the earliest recorded cricket matches at the Manor Sports Ground was on 17 July 1902 when Sussex Second XI took on Essex Second XI. Since 1924 it has been owned by Worthing Borough Council (formerly Worthing Corporation) and the ground was laid out in consultation with Sussex County Cricket Club.

The sports ground is named after Broadwater Manor, the manor house of the former manor of Broadwater, which lies some 50 yards to the north.

The Manor Ground hosted 43 first-class matches between 1935 and 1964, all of which involved Sussex County Cricket Club. It is hoped that first class cricket may soon return, as since 1999 minor Sussex matches have been played here.

The Manor Sports Ground has also hosted the internationally famous Worthing Hockey Festival since 1939.

In the 1960s crowds of people attended the Police sports and tattoo event which was held at the ground.

== Location ==
The large expanse of land is enclosed on three sides by housing and the other by a traditional flint wall. The ground lies between two significant north-south routes. The A24 Broadwater Road (the Worthing to London road) runs along the west side of the ground. Along the east side of the ground lies the Quashetts footpath, an ancient track which was originally used as a droveway over the South Downs into the Weald. The track seems to have been the basis of Worthing's grid system during the Romano-British period. The ground's entrance is in Georgia Avenue, a residential road to the south of the ground.

== Records ==
=== First-class ===
- Lowest team total: 23 by Sussex v Warwickshire, 1964
- Highest individual innings: 241 by John Langridge for Sussex v Somerset, 1950
- Most wickets in a match: 15–75 by Ian Thomson for Sussex v Warwickshire,1964

== Facilities ==
The site has two pavilions including one from the inter-war period, 2 cricket pitches, as well as 5 hockey and up to 3 mini football pitches. It takes up an area of 11.55 acres (4.67 ha).

== See also ==
- Sport in Worthing
