= Selena Charteris =

New Zealand cricketer (born 1981)

Personal information
- Full name: Selena Eloise Charteris
- Born: 5 June 1981 (age 45); Timaru, New Zealand
- Batting: Right-handed
- Bowling: Right-arm off break
- Role: Bowler

International information
- National side: New Zealand (2007)
- ODI debut (cap 104): 25 February 2007 v India
- Last ODI: 27 August 2007 v New Zealand
- T20I debut (cap 20): 10 August 2007 v South Africa
- Last T20I: 13 August 2007 v England

Domestic team information
- Years: Team
- 2002/03–2012/13: Canterbury

Career statistics
Competition	WODI	WT20I	WLA	WT20
Matches	5	2	64	6
Runs scored	20	5	135	5
Batting average	10.00	–	12.27	–
100s/50s	0/0	0/0	0/0	0/0
Top score	20*	5*	44*	5*
Balls bowled	96	24	2,152	108
Wickets	1	1	59	6
Bowling average	102.00	17.00	22.44	13.50
5 wickets in innings	0	0	1	0
10 wickets in match	0	0	0	0
Best bowling	1/32	1/17	5/31	2/6
Catches/stumpings	0/–	1/–	22/–	1/–
- Source: CricketArchive, 16 April 2021

Selena Eloise Charteris (born 5 June 1981) is a New Zealand former cricketer who played as a right-arm off break bowler. She appeared in five One Day Internationals and two Twenty20 Internationals for New Zealand in 2007. She played domestic cricket for Canterbury.
