= Hastings and St Leonards Priory Cricket Club =

Hastings and St Leonards Priory Cricket Club (often shortened down to Hastings Priory) is a cricket club in Hastings, East Sussex. The club is based at Horntye Park, where the 1st XI and 2nd XI play their home fixtures.

The club has fifteen teams including five men's teams, one ladies' team, seven boys' teams and two girls' teams. The 1st XI and 2nd XI play in the Sussex Cricket League and play their home fixtures at Horntye Park, the 3rd XI and 4th XI play in the East Sussex Cricket League and play their home fixtures at Ark Alexandra Academy.

== Teams ==
Team	League
1st XI	Sussex Cricket League 1st XI Premier League
2nd XI	Sussex Cricket League 2nd XI Division 5
3rd XI	Sussex Cricket League 3rd XI Division 11
Ladies XI	Southern Women's Championship Division

== Honours ==
- Sussex Cricket League
  - Premier Division champions 1999, 2002, 2003, 2011
