= Roger Marshall (cricketer) =

English cricketer

Personal information
- Full name: Roger Philip Twells Marshall
- Born: 28 February 1952 (age 74); Horsham, Sussex, England
- Batting: Right-handed
- Bowling: Left-arm fast-medium

Domestic team information
- Years: Team
- 1973–1978: Sussex

Career statistics
Competition	First-class	List A
Matches	24	12
Runs scored	315	53
Batting average	14.31	10.60
100s/50s	–/–	–/–
Top score	37	28
Balls bowled	3,365	498
Wickets	49	9
Bowling average	39.32	32.77
5 wickets in innings	–	–
10 wickets in match	–	–
Best bowling	4/37	2/29
Catches/stumpings	6/–	–/–
- Source: Cricinfo, 12 March 2012

Roger Philip Twells Marshall (born 28 February 1952) is a former English cricketer. Marshall was a right-handed batsman who bowled left-arm fast-medium.

Marshall was born at Horsham, Sussex, and educated at Charterhouse School, where he captained the school cricket team in his final year in 1970. He played for the Public Schools at Lord's in 1969.

Marshall made his first-class debut for Sussex against the touring West Indians in 1973. Wisden noted after his debut season that Marshall, "with his flowing ginger hair, brought some colour to the scene".

He appeared infrequently for the county's first eleven over six seasons, making the last of his 24 first-class appearances against Hampshire in the 1978 County Championship. Playing primarily as a bowler, Marshall took 49 wickets in first-class cricket, which came at an average of 39.32, with best figures of 4 for 37 against Glamorgan in 1973. With the bat, he scored a total of 315 runs at a batting average of 14.31, with a high score of 37.

Marshall also played List A cricket for the county, making his debut in that format against Northamptonshire in the 1973 John Player League. He featured in this format even less frequently than he did in first-class cricket, making eleven further List A appearances for Sussex, the last of which came against Kent in the 1978 John Player League. In his twelve List A appearances, he took 9 wickets at an average of 32.77, with best figures of 2/29. With the bat, he scored a total of 53 runs at an average of 10.60, with a high score of 28.
