= Ros Kember =

New Zealand cricketer (born 1985)

Personal information
- Full name: Rosamond Jane Kember
- Born: 28 January 1985 (age 41); Auckland, New Zealand
- Batting: Right-handed
- Bowling: Right-arm leg break
- Role: Batter

International information
- National side: New Zealand (2006–2008)
- ODI debut (cap 103): 22 October 2006 v Australia
- Last ODI: 3 March 2008 v England
- T20I debut (cap 21): 10 August 2007 v South Africa
- Last T20I: 13 August 2007 v England

Domestic team information
- Years: Team
- 2001/02: Northern Districts
- 2002/03–2008/09: Auckland

Career statistics
Competition	WTest	WODI	WLA	WT20
Matches	10	3	89	11
Runs scored	155	22	1,844	155
Batting average	15.50	7.33	22.48	14.09
100s/50s	0/1	0/0	0/11	0/0
Top score	64	15	94	36
Balls bowled	–	–	34	–
Wickets	–	–	1	–
Bowling average	–	–	43.00	–
5 wickets in innings	–	–	0	–
10 wickets in match	–	–	0	–
Best bowling	–	–	1/22	–
Catches/stumpings	3/–	0/–	30/–	1/–
- Source: CricketArchive, 22 April 2021

Rosamond Jane Kember (born 28 January 1985) is a New Zealand former cricketer who played as a right-handed batter. She appeared in 10 One Day Internationals and 3 Twenty20 Internationals for New Zealand between 2006 and 2008. She played domestic cricket for Northern Districts and Auckland.
