= Charlie Russell (cricketer) =

English cricketer (born 1988)

Personal information
- Full name: Charlotte Louise Russell
- Born: 4 February 1988 (age 38); Brighton, East Sussex, England
- Batting: Right-handed
- Bowling: Right-arm off-spin
- Role: Bowler

International information
- National side: England (2007)
- ODI debut (cap 110): 17 August 2007 v New Zealand
- Last ODI: 27 August 2007 v New Zealand
- Only T20I (cap 20): 16 August 2007 v New Zealand

Domestic team information
- Years: Team
- 2006–2011: Sussex
- 2007/08: Northern Districts

Career statistics
Competition	WODI	WT20I	WLA	WT20
Matches	2	1	55	10
Runs scored	4	2	117	54
Batting average	4.00	–	6.88	10.80
100s/50s	0/0	0/0	0/0	0/0
Top score	4	2*	18*	15
Balls bowled	54	24	1,900	174
Wickets	1	0	53	4
Bowling average	45.00	–	20.49	41.25
5 wickets in innings	0	–	1	0
10 wickets in match	0	–	0	0
Best bowling	1/45	–	5/29	2/21
Catches/stumpings	1/–	0/–	7/–	4/–
- Source: CricketArchive, 16 January 2021

Charlotte Louise Russell (born 4 February 1988) is a former international cricketer who made three appearances for the England women's cricket team. She played as an off-spin bowler who gave the ball air and a right-handed lower order batter.

== Early life ==
Russell was born on 4 February 1988 in Brighton, East Sussex.

== Domestic career ==
At county level Russell played for Sussex between 2006 and 2011, helping them to the County Championship title in 2008 and 2010. She also played for Diamonds in the Super Fours competition and for Brighton and Hove in club cricket.

Russell spent part of the 2007/08 winter in New Zealand playing for Northern Districts.

== International career ==
Russell made her England debut in a Twenty20 International against New Zealand at the County Ground, Taunton on 16 August 2007. She made her One Day International debut the following day, also against New Zealand at Taunton. Her only subsequent international match was a One Day International against New Zealand at Stanley Park, Blackpool on 27 August 2007. She took one wicket across her three international appearances.
