= Horsham Cricket Club =

Cricket club in Horsham, England

Coordinates: 51°03′29.70″N 0°20′00.90″W

Horsham Cricket Club is one of the oldest cricket clubs in the world and represents the Sussex market town of Horsham in the Sussex Cricket League, along with Roffey Cricket Club.

Although cricket was played in Horsham before 1768, the first recorded game of a town side was on 8 August 1771, and Horsham Cricket Club was created soon after 1806. The club has played at various locations over the years, before settling at their present ground in 1851.

== Cricketfield Road ==
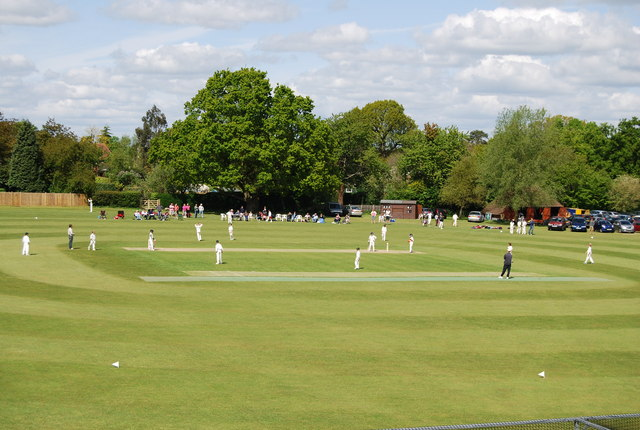

Horsham is on 'Cricketfield Road' and the Ground is known as the Cricketfield Road Ground. The two ends are called the Town End and the Railway End. Horsham's second ground, named after former President Dr. John Dew, lies adjacent to the main square.

== First XI ==
Horsham runs four Saturday men's teams, one Sunday men's and two women's teams. Horsham have won the Sussex League title a record eight times and the Cyril Snell trophy a record 11 times (including six times in seven years between 2001 and 2006); most recently in August 2010 where Horsham beat Stirlands CC to win a tight match by four runs, with two balls remaining. The club's crowning achievement came in 2005 when they won the Cockspur Cup for the first time in their history.

== Sussex CCC ==
Horsham CC annually hosts a week of cricket for Sussex County Cricket Club, being one of three official Sussex outgrounds. A first-class match and a domestic limited overs match is usually part of the week, known as the Horsham Cricket Festival.

== Notable Horsham cricketers ==
Players with first-class caps who have represented Horsham are:

- (England) Tom Haines
- (England) Tom Clark
- (England) Jofra Archer
- (England) Will Beer
- (England) Bertie Foreman
- (England) Shaun Humphries
- (England) Andrew Hodd
- (England) Carl Hopkinson
- (England) Will House
- (England) Robin Martin-Jenkins
- (England) Roger Marshall
- (England) Chris Nash
- (England) Michael Thornely
- (England) Michael Munday
- (Australia) David Hussey
- (Australia) Shane Jurgensen
- (New Zealand) Matt Henry
- (Namibia) Jan-Berrie Burger
- (Pakistan) Naved Arif Gondal
- (South Africa) Mark Sanders
- (Bermuda) Kamau Leverock
- (South Africa) Matthew de Villiers
- In the 1980s, Australian cricketer Tim May spent a season honing his offspin as a 19-year-old.
- In the 1970s Sussex and England cricketer, Paul Parker, lived and went to school in the town after his family arrived in the UK from Rhodesia.
