= South Saxons Hockey Club =

Field hockey club in Hastings, England

- Founded: 1895; 131 years ago
- League: South Hockey League & Martlets Open League
- Based in: Hastings, East Sussex England
- Home ground: Horntye Park Sports Complex
- Colours: Home Kit: Shirt-Pale Blue, Navy and Pink, Shorts-Navy, Socks-Pale Blue, Navy and Pink. Away Kit: Shirt-Red, Shorts-Navy, Socks-Pale Blue, Navy and Pink.

South Saxons Hockey Club is a field hockey club based in Hastings, England. The club was established in 1895 and their home ground is currently located at Horntye Park Sports Complex. The club has a sand dressed astro-turf pitch, clubhouse, changing facilities and cafe bar on-site at Horntye Park.

The men's 1st XI play within the South Hockey League structure in Martlets Mens League Division 1, and the ladies 1st XI play in the Martlets Ladies League Division 1.

The club fields five men's sides, two women's sides, a mixed team, three youth development teams and junior hockey 7s teams.

== Teams ==
=== Men's ===
- 1st XI - Martlets Open League - Division 1
- 2nd XI - Martlets Open League - Division 1
- 3rd XI - Martlets Open League - Division 2
- 4th XI - Martlets Open League - Division 3
- 5th XI - Martlets Open League - Division 4

=== Women ===
- 1st XI - Martlets Women's League - Division 1
- 2nd XI - Martlets Women's League - Division 3

=== Youth ===
- Warriors - Sussex Boys Development League
- Arrows - Sussex Boys Development League
- Bows - Sussex Girls Development League

=== Juniors ===
The club has a mixed junior development section of U10s to U12's. Boys, Girls and mixed teams represent the club in various hockey 7's knockout competitions across Sussex.
