= Preston Nomads Cricket Club =

Cricket club in England

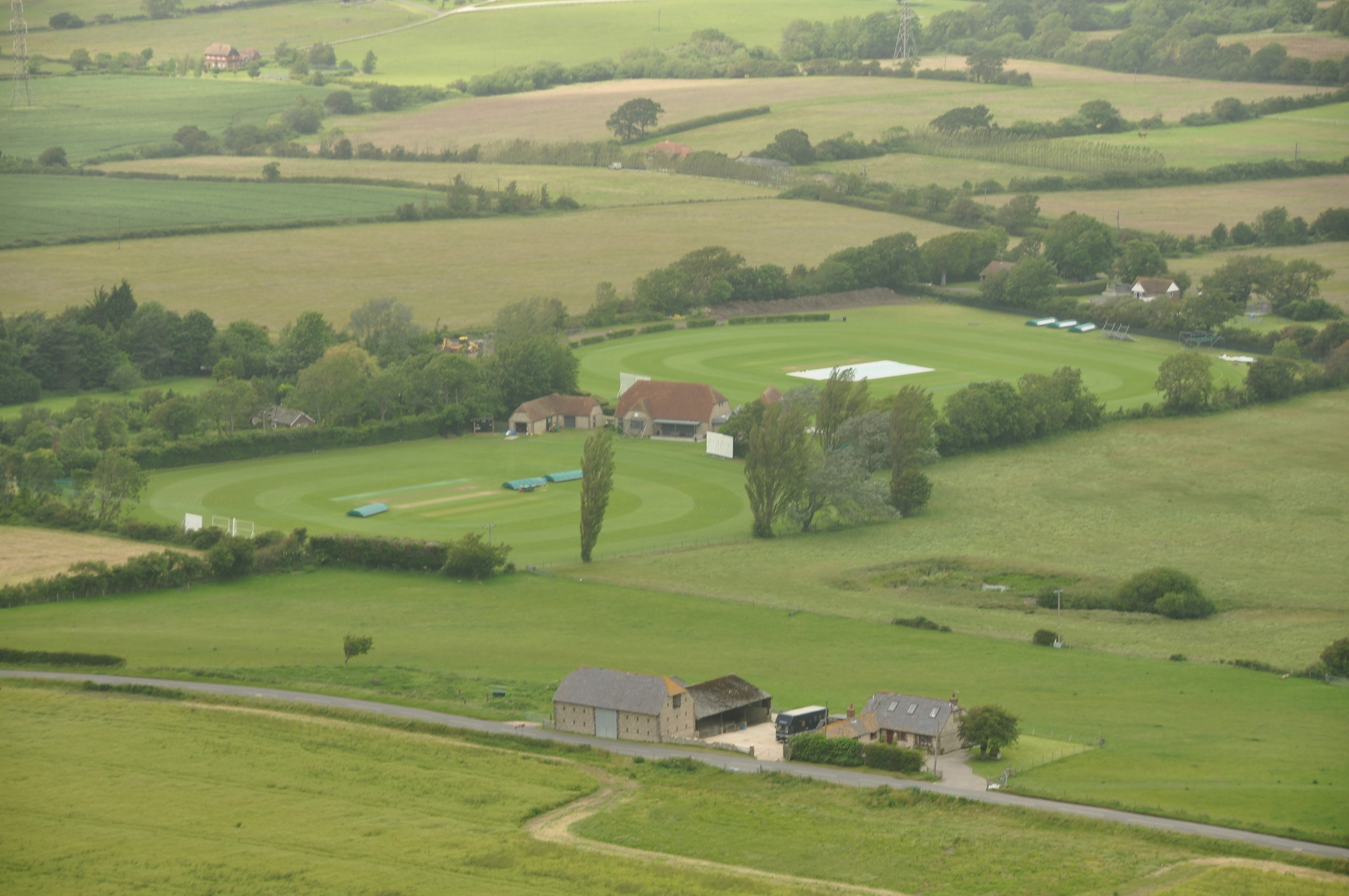

Team information
- Established: 1927; 98 years ago
- Home venue: Spen Cama Memorial Ground, Fulking

History
- No. of titles: 10
- Sussex Cricket League title wins: 1971, 1982, 1988, 2006, 2008, 2009, 2010, 2012, 2013, 2021
- Notable players: Spen Cama, Clare Connor, Luke Wright, Joe Gatting, Richard Montgomerie

Preston Nomads Cricket Club is a cricket club based in the Village of Fulking in West Sussex, England. Founded in 1927, the club's first XI plays in the Premier League of the Sussex Cricket League which is an accredited ECB Premier League, the highest level of recreational club cricket in England and Wales. In the late 2000s and early 2010s, the first XI won the Sussex Premier League six times in eight seasons (2006–13). They last won the Sussex Premier league in 2021.

== Honours ==
1st XI

- Sussex Cricket League Premier Division
  - Champions 2006, 2008, 2009, 2010, 2012, 2013, 2021
- Sussex Cricket League Division One (1st XI)
  - Champions 1971, 1982, 1988
- Sussex Cup
  - Winners 2004
- 20/20 Cup
  - Winners 2008, 2009, 2011,2015
- ECB National Indoor Six-a-side Club Cricket Championship
  - Winners 2009

2nd XI

- Sussex Cricket League Division 1 (2nd XI)
  - Champions 1977, 1997, 2005, 2015
- Sussex League Cup
  - Winners 2007
- 20/20 Cup
  - Winners 2015
