= Brighton and Hove Cricket Club =

Amateur cricket club in East Sussex, England

Brighton and Hove Cricket Club, nicknamed The Mighty Bensons, is an amateur cricket club based in East Sussex, in southern England. Their top team secured the Sussex Cricket League championship in 2000 and in 2007. Based since 1991 at the Nevill Sports Ground in Hove, southern England, the club achieved success in 1979 when it won both the first and second eleven competitions in the Sussex League, while playing at Horsdean.

2010 England wicket keeper and batsman, Matt Prior, has been a member of the club, as has the former England captain, Tony Greig and the New Zealand opening batsman Mark Richardson.

== Club history ==
=== County Ground ===
Brighton & Hove Cricket Club was founded on 22 August 1945, as an amalgamation of Hove Cricket Club (founded in 1918) and Brighton Nondescripts Cricket Club (founded in 1920). The club was based at the County Ground in Hove, Sussex, although all Sunday games had to be played away from home.

=== Withdean Stadium ===
By 1955 it was clear that the club could not remain at the County Ground and in the following year it moved to a very small ground next to the Withdean Stadium in Brighton. Here the club enjoyed a good family atmosphere, but the facilities were primitive and the use of the ground as a rugby pitch during the winter, and even as a collecting ring for a horse show, made playing-conditions dangerous. The Club found a temporary refuge at Longhill School in 1969 before moving to Horsdean.

=== Horsdean ===
At Horsdean, too, there were problems with the use of the playing surface for rugby during the winter, and the clubhouse was hardly suitable to be used as a cricket pavilion. But the square was improved until it became one of the best in club cricket, and this helped the club to achieve an increasing amount of success. The high point came in 1979 when the club won both the first and second eleven competitions in the Sussex League.

At the end of the 1990 season, however, a long-standing threat from the construction of a road bypass became a reality. With no sign of a replacement ground, the club spent 1991 without a venue, playing all Sunday matches away, but fulfilling its League fixtures thanks to the kindness of Brighton Polytechnic, on whose pitch they were allowed to play.

=== Nevill Ground ===
Towards the end of the 1991 season, the club was offered the use of the Nevill Ground by Hove Borough Council, which was in the process of renovating the clubhouse. Ironically, this was one of the grounds the club had considered moving to in 1956 and rejected. The club eagerly accepted the council's offer, work began on the square that autumn, and since then the club enjoyed a happy collaboration with Hove Borough Council. Improvements at the Nevill Sports Arena provided the club with excellent facilities for the 2009 season.

== Achievements ==
With several players having represented their Counties, or attended the University Center of Cricketing Excellence – a scheme set up by the England and Wales Cricket Board – the Club stands as one of the most highly profiled amateur cricket clubs in England and Wales.

The most recent former player with Brighton and Hove Cricket Club to make a name for himself is Matthew Prior, who signed for Sussex County Cricket Club and has since gone on to earn himself many England caps. Another international cricketer to play for The Mighty Bensons is New Zealender Mark Richardson, who has a century against England to his name. Tony Greig, who captained England in the 1970s, has been a member of Brighton and Hove Cricket Club. Also brothers Alen and Colin Wells (Sussex and England) Alan (Sussex) and RP(Roly)Willows (Middlesex and Lords Ground Staff) represented Brighton and Hove during the 1970 and 1980 along with Jerry Morley and Andy Dindar (Middlesex).
