= Sussex Cricket League =

EBC Premier League

- Countries: England
- Administrator: Sussex Cricket Board (Premier Division is accredited by the ECB)
- Format: Limited overs cricket
- First edition: 1971 (Founded); 1999 (ECB Premier League)
- Tournament format: League
- Number of teams: 10 (ECB Premier Division)
- Current champion: Roffey CC
- Most successful: Preston Nomads CC (11 Titles)
- Relegation to: Division 2
- Website: https://sussexcricketleague.play-cricket.com/

The Sussex Cricket League, founded in 1971, is the top level of competition for recreational club cricket in Sussex, England, and since 1999 the Premier Division has been a designated ECB Premier League. The League headquarters is based in Hove, East Sussex. Following a review of club cricket in Sussex the league now has 35 divisions, and no longer are there separate competitions for 2nd and lower XIs.

== Champions ==
- Champions, 1971–1990
  Year	Club
  1971	Preston Nomads
  1972	Eastbourne
  1973	Bognor Regis
  1974	Eastbourne
  1975	Three Bridges
  1976	Horsham
  1977	Horsham
  1978	Hastings and St Leonards Priory
  1979	Brighton and Hove
  1980	Horsham
  1981	Horsham
  1982	Preston Nomads
  1983	Horsham
  1984	Chichester Priory Park
  1985	Hastings and St Leonards Priory
  1986	Lewes Priory
  1987	Eastbourne
  1988	Preston Nomads
  1989	Hastings and St Leonards Priory
  1990	Lewes Priory
- Champions, 1991–2010
  Year	Club
  1991	Horsham
  1992	Chichester Priory Park
  1993	Chichester Priory Park
  1994	Chichester Priory Park
  1995	Eastbourne
  1996	Three Bridges
  1997	Bexhill
  1998	Eastbourne
  1999	Hastings and St Leonards Priory
  2000	Brighton and Hove
  2001	Horsham
  2002	Hastings and St Leonards Priory
  2003	Hastings and St Leonards Priory
  2004	Horsham
  2005	Chichester Priory Park
  2006	Preston Nomads
  2007	Brighton and Hove
  2008	Preston Nomads
  2009	Preston Nomads
  2010	Preston Nomads
- Champions, 2011–present
  Year	Club
  2011	Hastings and St Leonards Priory
  2012	Preston Nomads
  2013	Preston Nomads
  2014	Roffey
  2015	Roffey
  2016	Roffey
  2017	East Grinstead
  2018	Roffey
  2019	Roffey
  2020	no competition
  2021	Preston Nomads
  2022	Roffey
  2023	Cuckfield
  2024	Preston Nomads
  2025	Horsham
  2026	Roffey

=== Championships won ===
- Premier Division Champions
  Wins	Club
  11	Preston Nomads
  9	Horsham
  7	Hastings and St Leonards Priory
  7	Roffey
  5	Chichester Priory Park
  5	Eastbourne
  3	Brighton and Hove
  2	Lewes Priory
  2	Three Bridges
  1	Bexhill
  1	Bognor Regis
  1	Cuckfield
  1	East Grinstead

== Premier Division performance by season from 1999 ==
Key
Gold	Champions
Blue	Left League
Red	Relegated

Performance by season, from 1999
Club	1999	2000	2001	2002	2003	2004	2005	2006	2007	2008	2009	2010	2011	2012	2013	2014	2015	2016	2017	2018	2019	2021	2022	2023	2024	2025	2026
Ansty																			9								
Bexhill	?	9										11		10		8	4	3	10								
Billingshurst																	6	9									
Bognor Regis																							4	8	8	8	7
Brighton and Hove	?	1	4	4	3	2	5	6	1	5	3	3	8	6	9	5	7	8	8	6	2	8	9				
Chichester Priory Park	?	8	8	7	7	4	1	9		10		5	7	7	10												
Crowborough	?	4	3																								
Cuckfield								3	2	6	7	10			6	9	8	2	3	7	8	9		1	5	7	10
East Grinstead			10		5	7	8	5	6	8	2	6	4	4	2	4	2	6	1	4	5	2	2	3	6	10	
Eastbourne	?	7	6	5	8	3	3	7	3	3	6	9	6	9		6	9			2	7	6	8	9			
Hastings and St Leonards Priory	1	2	2	1	1	5	7	2	5	2	8	7	1	3	4	11		5	5	9		7	10		9		9
Haywards Heath		6	9	10							10											10				6	8
Horsham	?	5	1	2	2	1	6	4	7	9	4	2	2	2	3	3	5	4	4	5	9		3	5	2	1	6
Ifield																				10							
Lewes Priory						10			10		11															9	
Littlehampton Clapham & Patching							9																				
Mayfield																					10			10			
Middleton																	10		7	8	4	5	5	4	4	5	2
Preston Nomads	?						2	1	4	1	1	1	3	1	1	2	3	7	6	3	6	1	7	2	1	2	4
Pulborough													10														
Roffey													5	5	8	1	1	1	2	1	1	3	1	7	7	4	1
St James's Montefiore				9		9		10																			
Steyning				8	6	8	10		9																		
Stirlands					11					11																	
Sussex Cricket Board (Note: The Sussex Cricket Board development team was not eligible to be the champions or to be relegated, and withdrew from league cricket after the 2016 season.)					10	11	11	11	11	4	5	4	9	11	5	7	11	10									
Three Bridges	?	3	7	3	4	6	4	8	8	7	9	8	11		7	10					3	4	6	6	3	3	5
West Chiltington & Thakeham																											3
Worthing			5	6	9									8	11			11							10		
References																											

== See also ==
- Cricket in Sussex
