= List of Sussex cricketers to 1838 =

This is an incomplete list of cricketers who played for Sussex before the foundation of the county club in March 1839.

Cricket is widely thought to have evolved from bat-and-ball games played by children in the south-east England counties of Kent and Sussex, particularly in the Weald and the North and South Downs. There are references to cricket in Sussex through the 17th century. In June 1697, the first known newspaper report about what was then called "a great match at cricket" concerned one in Sussex. It was played eleven-a-side for fifty guineas, a colossal sum at the time, indicating that two strong teams were assembled. While this may have been an historically important match, possibly between two county teams, the report is very brief, and details of the match itself were not included.

In the 1720s, more information was recorded, and among the known matches are those organised by the 2nd Duke of Richmond and Sir William Gage. Some of their matches were against each other, but they also opposed patrons from other counties, particularly Edwin Stead of Kent. One of the earliest great players was Thomas Waymark, noted for his "extraordinary agility and dexterity", who was employed by Richmond.

The first match known to involve a team called Sussex was against Kent at Walworth Common on 24 June 1729. After that, Sussex matches were sporadic until the emergence of Brighton Cricket Club around 1790. In the 1820s, Sussex were the flagbearers of the roundarm revolution, and their bowlers Jem Broadbridge and William Lillywhite were key to the new style's acceptance. Sussex remained a strong team into the 1830s. On 17 June 1836, the Sussex Cricket Fund was established to support county matches, and this led to the foundation on 1 March 1839 of Sussex County Cricket Club, England's oldest county club.

This list of players includes those who went on to play for the county club. It does not include any who played for the club, but not for the pre-1839 team. Note also that many of the players appeared for other teams besides Sussex.

== Key ==
- † preceding a player's name means that the original article is now a redirect to this list.

== A ==
- Benjamin Aislabie
- Charles Andrew
- William Ashby
- W. Ayling (Note: W. Ayling was active in 1825 and 1826. It is unknown if he had any connection with William Ayling.)
- Henry Ayres

== B ==
- George Baigent
- James Bray Baker
- John Barnard
- George Barton
- William Battcock
- Charles Bayly
- John Bayton
- Thomas Blake
- Richard Bodle
- John Borrer
- Michael Botting
- H. Bowley
- Thomas Box
- James Bray
- Charles Broadbridge
- Jem Broadbridge
- Robert Broadbridge
- William Broadbridge
- George Brown
- William Brown

== C ==
- Richard Cheslyn
- Silas Cooper
- St Vincent Cotton
- † Courtnay (1826) : Courtnay

== D ==
- James Dale
- George Daniels
- James Dean
- William Dench
- Charles Dilloway
- John Dilloway
- Charles Duff

== E ==
- Etherington

== F ==
- Henry Faithful
- George Faulkner

== G ==
- Sir William Gage.
- George Goad
- William Goring
- James Grinham

== H ==
- John Hammond
- Frederick Haslett
- Charles Hawkins
- Hill
- James Hodson
- William Hodson
- William Hooker
- Henry Howard

== J ==
- William Jenkins
- Jones

== K ==
- William Keen
- Kelsey
- Henry Kingscote
- Henry Knight

== L ==
- William Lambert
- Charles Lanaway
- James Light
- Charles Lillywhite
- William Lillywhite
- George Lister-Kaye

== M ==
- Richard Martin
- William Mason
- George Meads
- Francis Mellersh
- George Millyard
- Henry Morley
- George Murrell

== N ==
- J. Napper

== O ==
- George Osbaldeston

== P ==
- William Pellett
- William Pickett
- George Picknell
- Robert Picknell
- Charles Pierpoint
- Thomas Pierpoint
- Fuller Pilch
- J. Poulet
- James Preston
- Price

== R ==
- 2nd Duke of Richmond
- C. Roots

== S ==
- James Saunders
- Richard Searle
- John Slater
- William Slater
- Richard Stanford
- William Sturt

== T ==
- Henry Tamplin
- Charles Taylor
- James Taylor
- James Thumwood
- Edward Thwaites

== U ==
- May Upton

== V ==
- Philip Vallance

== W ==
- John Wallington
- Henry Warner
- Charles Warren
- Thomas Waymark
- Frederick Wells
- Wilkinson
- Richard Willis
- Earl Winterton
- Edward Woodbridge

== See also ==
- List of Sussex County Cricket Club players
- Cricket in Sussex

== Bibliography ==
- Birley, Derek (1999). A Social History of English Cricket. London: Aurum Press. ISBN 978-18-54107-10-7 – via Internet Archive.
- Bowen, Rowland (1970). Cricket: A History of its Growth and Development. London: Eyre & Spottiswoode. ISBN 978-04-13278-60-9.
- Buckley, G. B. (1935). Fresh Light on 18th Century Cricket. Birmingham: Cotterell & Co. OCLC 23450280.
- Carlaw, Derek (2020). Kent County Cricketers, A to Z: Part One (1806–1914) (PDF). Cardiff: ACS.
- Maun, Ian (2009). From Commons to Lord's, Volume One: 1700 to 1750. Cambridge: Roger Heavens. ISBN 978-19-00592-52-9.
- McCann, Tim (2004). Sussex Cricket in the Eighteenth Century (PDF). Vol. 88. Lewes: West Sussex Record Office. ISBN 978-08-54450-55-8.
- Underdown, David (2000). Start of Play. Westminster: Allen Lane. ISBN 978-07-13993-30-1 – via Internet Archive.
- Waghorn, H. T. (2005) [1906]. The Dawn of Cricket. London: J. W. McKenzie. ISBN 978-09-47821-17-3.
