= James Dean (disambiguation) =

James Dean (1931–1955) was an American actor and racing driver.

James, Jimmy, or Jim Dean may also refer to:

== People ==
=== In music ===
- James Dean Bradfield (born 1969), Welsh singer-songwriter
- James Dean (songwriter) (1943–2006), American songwriter
- Jimmy Dean (1928–2010), American country music singer, entertainer and businessman

=== In sports ===
- Jimmy Dean, English football manager for Scunthorpe United F.C.
- James Dean (cricketer, born 1842) (1842–1869), English cricketer
- Jimmy Dean (baseball) (1925–2000), American baseball player
- Jimmy Dean (American football) (1955–2015), American football player
- James Dean (cricketer, born 1955), English cricketer
- James Dean (footballer) (1985–2021), English footballer
- Jemmy Dean (James Dean, 1816–1881), English cricketer

=== Other people ===
- James Dean, American artist and creator of Pete the Cat
- James Dean, first director of the NASA Art Program
- James Dean (judge), first African American judge elected in Florida after Reconstruction
- James Dean (Georgia politician), American social worker and politician
- James R. Dean (1862–1936), Nebraska Supreme Court Justice
- James Theodore Dean (1865–1939), United States Army officer
- James W. Dean Jr., American academic administrator
- Jim Dean (activist), chairman of Democracy for America

== Film ==
- James Dean (1976 film), a 1976 NBC television film starring Stephen McHattie as Dean
- James Dean (2001 film), a 2001 biographical television film starring James Franco as Dean

== Songs ==
- "James Dean" (song), by the Eagles, 1974
- "James Dean (I Wanna Know)", by Daniel Bedingfield, 2002
- "Jimmy Dean" (song), by Troll, 1989
- "James Dean", by Bleeker, 2018
- "James Dean", by Bonnie Tyler from Silhouette in Red, 1993
- "James Dean", by Goo Goo Dolls from Jed, 1989
- "James Dean", by Kevin McHale, 2019
- "James Dean", by Selma Bajrami, 2012
- "James Dean", by Ufo361 from Ich bin 3 Berliner, 2017
- "James Dean", by The Wrecks from Panic Vertigo, 2018

== Other uses ==
- Jimmy Dean, unseen character in the play and film Come Back to the 5 & Dime, Jimmy Dean, Jimmy Dean
- Jimmy Dean (brand), an American sausage brand owned by Tyson Foods

== See also ==
- James Deane (disambiguation)
- James Deen (born 1986), American pornographic film actor
- The James Dean Story, a documentary film by Robert Altman and George W. George
