= William Hodson =

William Hodson may refer to:

- William Stephen Raikes Hodson (1821–1858), British leader of irregular light cavalry during the Indian Rebellion of 1857
- William Hodson (cricketer, born 1808)
- William Hodson (cricketer, born 1841)
- Bill Hodson (1891–1971), Australian politician
