= David Dean (cricketer) =

English cricketer

Personal information
- Full name: David Dean
- Born: 27 July 1847; Duncton, Sussex, England
- Died: 19 June 1919 (aged 71); Graffham, Sussex, England
- Relatives: James Dean (brother); Jemmy Dean (uncle)

Domestic team information
- Years: Team
- 1871: Sussex

Career statistics
| Competition | First-class |
|---|---|
| Matches | 2 |
| Runs scored | 8 |
| Batting average | 2.66 |
| 100s/50s | 0/0 |
| Top score | 6 |
| Catches/stumpings | 1/– |
- Source: Cricinfo, 14 December 2011

David Dean (27 July 1847 – 19 June 1919) was an English cricketer. Dean's batting and bowling styles are unknown. He was born at Duncton, Sussex.

Dean made two first-class appearances for Sussex against Kent and Surrey in 1871. Against Kent at the Royal Brunswick Ground, Hove, Dean scored 6 runs in Sussex's first-innings before he became one of 9 wickets for George Bennett. Sussex won the match by an innings and 130 runs. Against Surrey at The Oval, Dean was dismissed for a single run in Sussex's first-innings by William Marten, while in their second-innings he opened the batting and was dismissed for the same score by Edward Bray. Sussex won the match by 9 wickets.

He died at Graffham, Sussex on 19 June 1919. His brother James and uncle Jemmy Dean also played first-class cricket.
