= Lily White =

Lily White may refer to:

- Lily White (photographer) (1866–1944)
- Lily White, a character in the Touhou Project video game series
- Lily White, a member of the lily-white movement of the U.S. Republican Party
- Lily White, a sub-unit in the media-mix project Love Live!

== See also ==
- Lillywhite (surname)
- Lilywhites (disambiguation)
