= William Pickett =

William Pickett may refer to:

- William Pickett (cricketer) (1805–1849), English cricketer
- William Pickett (alderman) (died 1796), English goldsmith and local politician, Lord Mayor of London in 1789
- William B. Pickett (born 1940), American historian

== See also ==
- Bill Pickett (Willie M. Pickett, 1870–1932), cowboy, rodeo, Wild West show performer and actor
- Bill Pickett (lawyer), American lawyer
- Wilson Pickett (1941–2006), American singer and songwriter
