= Goad (disambiguation) =

Goad refers to a farming implement used to spur livestock, including:

- Ankus, a goad used for elephants
- Cattle prod, a goad used for cattle

Goad may also refer to:

== People with the name ==
- Alan Goad (born 1954), Australian footballer
- Beattie Goad (born 1997), Australian footballer
- George Goad (cricketer) (1806–1878), English cricketer
- George Goad (died 1671), master of Eton College
- Jim Goad (born 1961), American author and publisher
- Philip Goad, Australian professor of architecture
- Robin Goad (born 1970), American weightlifter

== Other uses ==
- Goad map, Goad plan, or Goad atlas, a navigation resource that incorporates detailed street maps including individual buildings and their uses
