= Jacques Pervititch =

Urban cartographer of Istanbul insurance maps from 1922 to 1945

- The only extant photograph of Jacques Pervititch
- Born: Jakub Pervitić; 17 February 1877; Močići, Austria-Hungary
- Died: 13 November 1945 (aged 68); Istanbul, Turkey
- Resting place: Pervititch family grave, Saint Albert Section, Feriköy Latin Catholic Cemetery, Istanbul, Turkey
- Education: Lycée Saint-Joseph, Istanbul
- Known for: Insurance maps of Istanbul
- Spouse: Josephine Drossa (married 1903)
- Children: 3

Signature
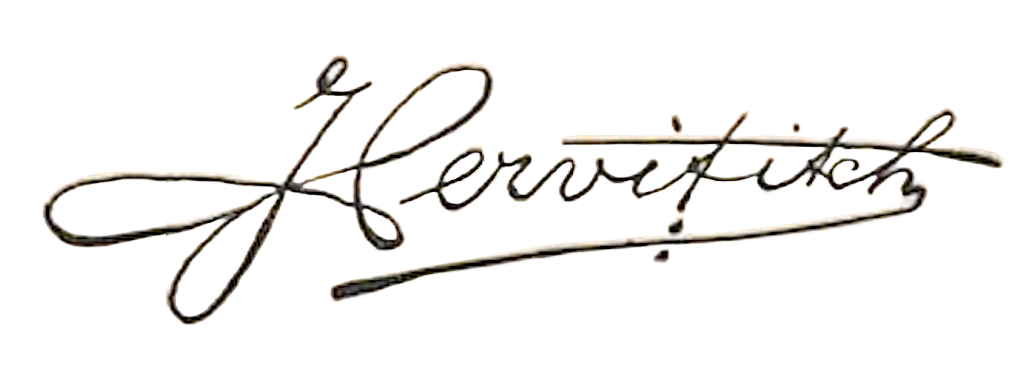

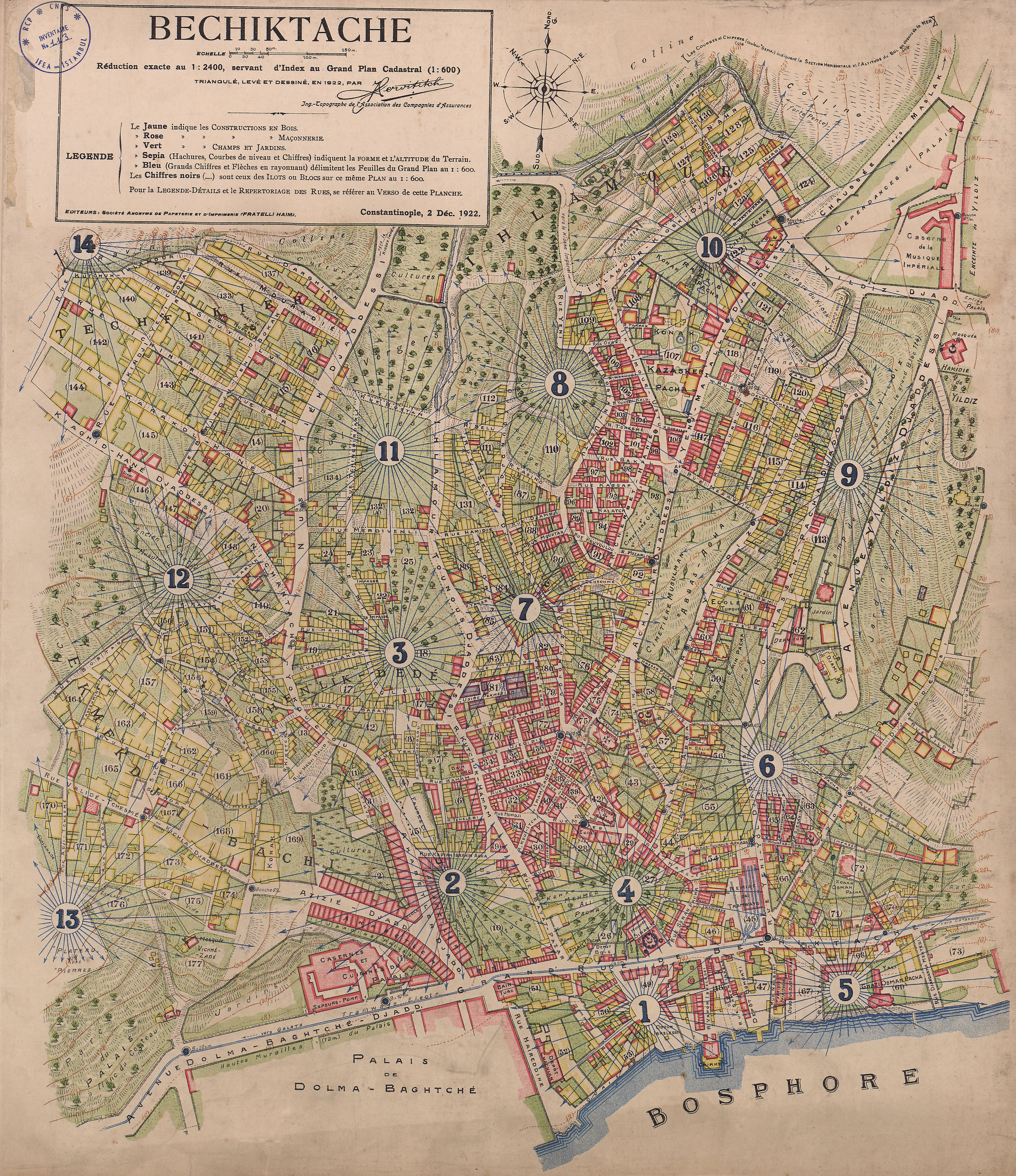
Index Map of the Beşiktaş [Bechiktache] series, 1922, serving as a guide to the individual sections.

Jacques Pervititch (born Jakub Pervitić; (Note: His Croatian surname is gallicized as Pervititch, or alternatively as Pervitich. In maps made after 1940, it is seen phonetically Turkified into "Pervitiç" (Turkish pronunciation: [pæɾ.ˈvi.titʃ]).) 17 February 1877 – 13 November 1945) was a Croatian-born Turkish cartographer and topographical engineer. Pervititch is best known for his series of insurance maps of Istanbul, produced from 1922 to his death in 1945.

== Early life and education ==
Jacques Pervititch was born on 17 February 1877, the first of four children to Pero Pervitić and Marianna Guljelmović, in the Croatian village of Močići, then a part of the Austro-Hungarian Empire. He was raised in a Catholic family who, having moved to Istanbul in 1880, had their children attend French Catholic minority schools in the city. Pervititch graduated from the Ecole Saint-Pierre elementary school and the Lycée Saint-Joseph high school, the latter with distinction in 1895. Little else is known about his early life.

== Pervititch Maps and career ==
Pervititch is known for his eponymous Pervititch Maps (Turkish: Pervititch Haritaları, properly the Plan cadastral d’assurances de la ville de Constantinople), a series of highly detailed cadastral insurance maps depicting urbanised areas of Istanbul. The maps were a continuation of three previous series prepared by Charles E. Goad, an English cartographer and early pioneer of the insurance map, between 1904 and 1906. Like Goad, Pervititch was employed by the Syndicate of Fire Insurance Companies Operating in Constantinople, founded in 1900 by a group of insurance companies which had been established in the aftermath of the Great Fire of Beyoğlu in 1870. Pervititch produced a total of 243 maps over the course of his career, the high level of detail and consistency of which have rendered them a primary source for urban historians of Istanbul.

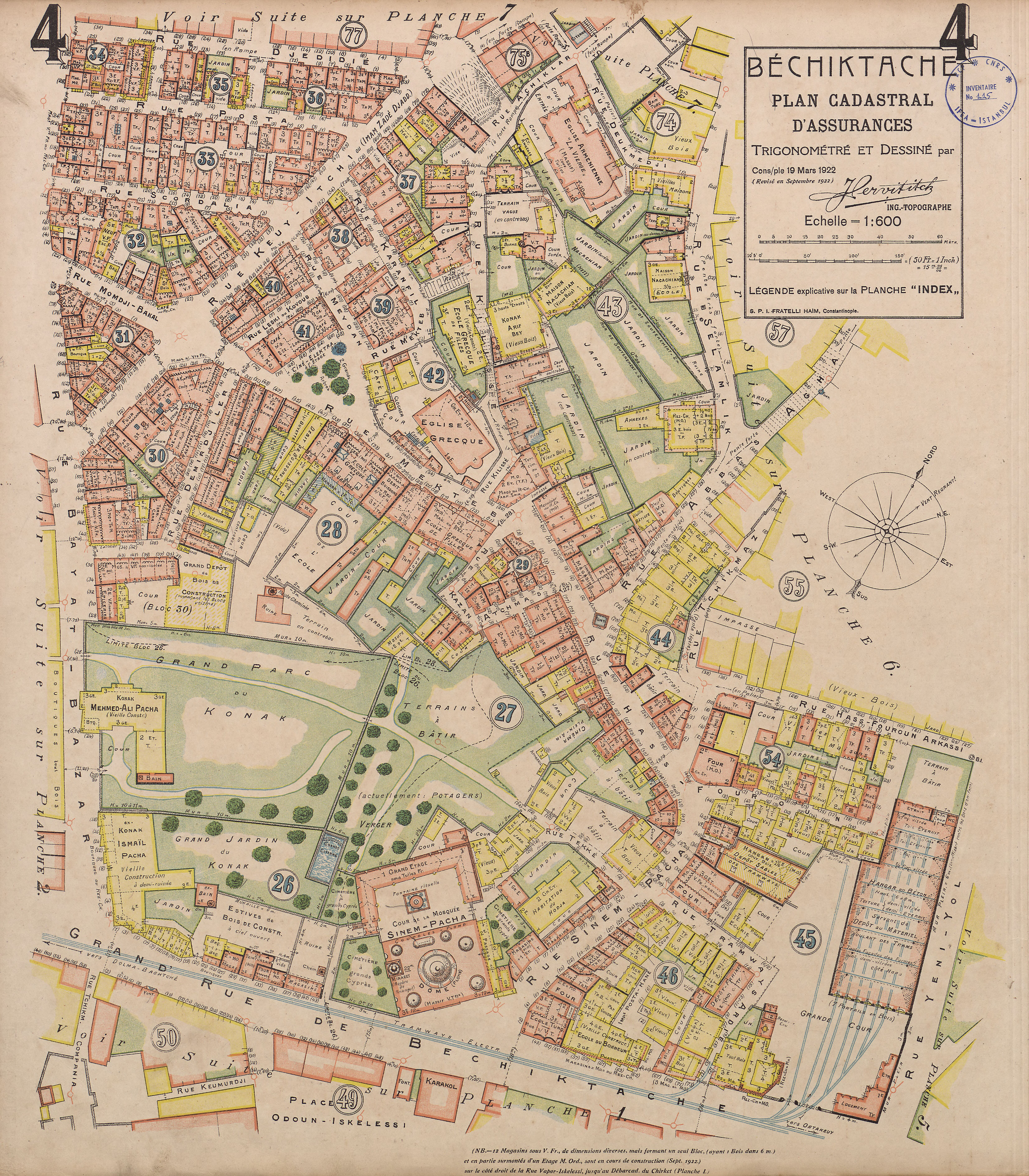
Fourth plate from Beşiktaş [Bechiktache] series, 1922, showing Serencebey.

Pervititch is only known to have produced one map outside of the Istanbul insurance map series.

Following his death, a shorter series of insurance maps were produced by Suat Nirven between 1946 – 1950, intending to complete Pervititch's unfinished work.

== Personal life ==
Pervititch married Josephine Drossa in 1903, with whom he had three children: Marcel (b. 1903), Jeanne (b. 1907), and Henri (b. 1911). Records indicate that the family lived on Aynalı Çeşme Street in Tarlabaşı from at least 1903 to 1907, and moved to a house at Number 7 Yaver Street in Kadıköy before Henri was born. No records exist from this point onwards, until Pervititch's "sudden" death in 1945, at the age of 68, of unknown causes. He is buried at the Pervititch family grave at the Saint Albert section of the Feriköy Latin Catholic Cemetery in Istanbul.

== See also ==
- Charles E. Goad
- History of Istanbul
- Sanborn Maps

== Bibliography ==
- Sabancıoğlu, Müsemma (2000). Jacques Pervititch Sigorta Haritalarında İstanbul [Istanbul in the Insurance Maps of Jacques Pervititch] (in Turkish). Istanbul: Türkiye Ekonomik ve Toplumsal Tarih Vakfı - AXA Oyak. ISBN 979-9757306732.
- Tülek, Murat, Jean-françois Pérouse, ve Funda Ferhanoğlu. 2024. “1922 Öncesinde Jacques Pervititch”. Toplumsal Tarih Akademi, sy 5: 23-58. https://izlik.org/JA85LP99NF.
- Öner, Erhan (2016). A Journey Through Maps from the Ottoman World to the Republic of Turkey from Constantinople to Istanbul: Between the 15th and the 20th centuries, the Cartographic Collection of Erhan Öner. Vol. 4. Istanbul: Eren Yayıncılık. ISBN 978-9756372586.
- Yeltekin, Erman. Şişli bölgesine ait tarihi Pervititch sigorta haritalarının planimetrik doğruluklarının incelenmesi ve bölgedeki alansal değişimin irdelenmesi üzerine bir çalışma / A study on the examination of planimetric accuracy of historical Pervititch insurance maps of Şişli region and the evaluation of the areal change in the region (Masters thesis) (in Turkish). Istanbul Technical University.
