= Courtnay =

Courtnay is both a surname and given name. Notable people with the name include:

- Courtnay (Sussex cricketer), English cricketer
- Frank Courtnay (1903–1980), Australian politician
- Courtnay Pilypaitis (born 1988), Canadian basketball player and coach
