= Picknell =

Picknell is a surname. Notable people with the surname include:

- George Picknell (1813–1863), English cricketer
- Robert Picknell (1816–1869), English cricketer
- William Lamb Picknell (1853–1897), American painter
- Gavin Bruce Picknell, Arachnologist responsible for the discovery of Steatoda nobilis in New Zealand

== See also ==
- Pickrell, surname
