= Pickrel =

Pickrel is a surname. Notable people with the surname include:

- Annalise Pickrel (born 1992), American basketball player
- Clarence Pickrel (1911–1983), American baseball player
- William G. Pickrel (1888–1966), American attorney and politician

== See also ==
- Pickerel (disambiguation)
- Pickrell, surname
- Picknell, surname
- Tamsin Pickeral (born 1971), art historian
