= Bodoe (surname) =

Bodoe is a surname. Notable people with the surname include:

- Lackram Bodoe, Trinidadian politician
- Mahadeo Bodoe, Trinidadian cricketer

== See also ==
- Bodle (surname)
