= Lillywhite =

Lillywhite is an English surname. Notable people with the surname include:

- Barry Lillywhite (born 1946), British modern pentathlete
- Charles Lillywhite (born c. 1804, English cricketer
- Chris Lillywhite (born 1966), English cyclist
- Fred Lillywhite (1829–1866), English cricketing entrepreneur
- Henry Lillywhite (1789–1858), English cricketer
- James Lillywhite (cricketer, born 1793) (1793–?), English cricketer
- James Lillywhite (1842–1929), English Test cricketer, first Test to Australia
- John Lillywhite (1826–1874), English cricketer
- Louis Lillywhite (born 1948), British Army general
- Shae Lillywhite (born 1985), Australian baseball player
- Steve Lillywhite (born 1955), English record producer
- Verl Lillywhite (1926–2007), American football player
- William Lillywhite (1792–1854), English cricketer

== See also ==
- Lilywhite, a song by Cat Stevens, from the album Mona Bone Jakon (1970)
- The Lilywhites, a nickname for Tottenham Hotspur F.C.
- Major Lilywhite, protagonist on the TV series iZombie
