= Charles Lillywhite =

English cricketer

Personal information
- Full name: Charles Lillywhite
- Born: Unknown; Duncton, Sussex, England
- Died: Unknown
- Batting: Unknown
- Bowling: Unknown

Domestic team information
- Years: Team
- 1837: Sussex

Career statistics
Competition	First-class
Matches	1
Runs scored	4
Batting average	2.00
100s/50s	–/–
Top score	4
Balls bowled	–
Wickets	–
Bowling average	–
5 wickets in innings	–
10 wickets in match	–
Best bowling	–
Catches/stumpings	–/–
- Source: Cricinfo, 27 May 2013

Charles Lillywhite (dates of birth and death unknown) was an English cricketer. Lillywhite's batting style is unknown. He was christened at Duncton, Sussex on 11 March 1804.

Lillywhite made a single first-class appearance for Sussex in 1837 against Kent at the Old County Ground, West Malling. In a match which Kent won by 2 wickets, Lillywhite opened the batting in both of Sussex's innings, being dismissed for a duck in their first-innings by Robert Hills and for 4 runs in their second-innings.
