= Battcock =

Battcock is a surname. Notable people with the surname include:

- Gregory Battcock (1937–1980), American art critic and actor in Andy Warhol films - see Eating Too Fast
- Oliver Battcock (1903–1970), English cricketer
- William Battcock, English cricketer
