= Philip Vallance =

Philip Vallance may refer to:

- Philip Vallance (cricketer, born 1803) (1803–1897), English cricketer
- Philip Vallance (cricketer, born 1761) (1761–?), English cricketer
