= Richard Stanford =

Richard Stanford may refer to:

- Richard Stanford (Kent cricketer) (1754–1792), English cricketer
- Richard Stanford (Sussex cricketer), English cricketer
- Richard Stanford (American politician) (1767–1816), U.S. Representative from North Carolina
- Richard Stanford (Stafford MP), Member of Parliament (MP) for Stafford 1382–1402 and relative of Hugh de Stanford
- Richard Stanford (rugby union) (born 1986), rugby union footballer
- Richard Stanford (British Army officer), British general
