= Tamplin =

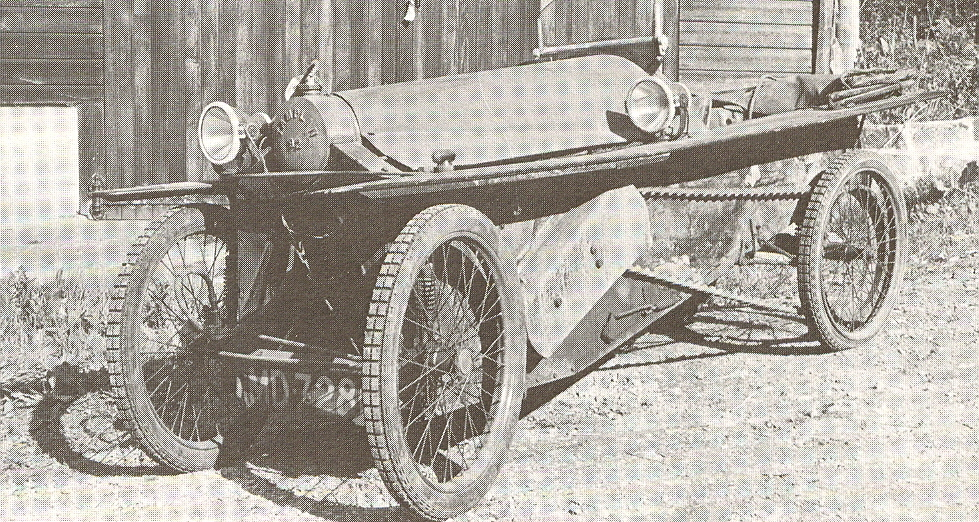
- 1921 Tamplin

Overview
- Manufacturer: Tamplin Motors
- Production: 1919-1924
- Designer: Sir John Carden

Body and chassis
- Class: Cyclecar
- Body style: 2-seat open

Powertrain
- Engine: 980 cc

Dimensions
- Wheelbase: 84 inches (2134 mm)
- Width: 34 inches (860 mm)

Tamplin Light Car

Overview
- Production: 1924-1925

Body and chassis
- Class: Cyclecar
- Body style: 2-seat

Powertrain
- Engine: 964 cc

Dimensions
- Wheelbase: 84 inches (2134 mm)
- Length: 114 inches (2896 mm)
- Width: 42 inches (1067 mm)

The Tamplin was an English automobile manufactured by Tamplin Motors from 1919 to 1923 in Kingston Road, Staines, Middlesex and from 1924 to 1925 in Malden Road, Cheam, Surrey.

Edward Alfred Tamplin, a member of the Sussex brewing family but with no direct involvement in the business, ran the Railway Garage in Staines. He was an agent for the Carden cyclecar and in 1919, after contracting to take the entire output, purchased the rights to manufacture it. The car was powered by a 980 cubic centimetres (60 cu in) JAP V-twin, air-cooled engine mounted on the side of the body and coupled by chain drive to a Sturmey-Archer three-speed-and-reverse gearbox and then by an exposed belt to the rear wheels. To avoid the need for a differential, drive was to the left-side rear wheel. The engine was started by a kick starter from the driver's seat. The clutch pedal, when fully depressed, operated the brakes. The wheels were close together, giving the car a very narrow track. The independent front suspension used coil springs and the rear had quarter elliptical leaf springs. Some cars were fitted with Blackburne engines.

The open body was made of fibreboard which was made waterproof by soaking it in linseed oil. The car seated two people, one behind the other. The body tub also acted as the chassis.

In 1924 a new, more conventional, version was announced with a front-mounted engine and a much wider body, allowing side-by-side seating. A centrally mounted chain replaced the belt drive to the rear axle. The new model also had a separate chassis.

Total production of the cars is uncertain. Tamplin claimed 1896 were made, but this is not supported by known chassis numbers. At the busiest times up to 14 cars a week may have been made.

By 1925 the market for cyclecars was effectively over and Tamplin returned to the garage business becoming a truck dealer.

== See also ==
- List of car manufacturers of the United Kingdom
