= Henry Warner =

Henry Warner may refer to:

- Henry F. Warner (1923–1944), U.S. Army soldier and Medal of Honor recipient
- Henry Warner (English cricketer), English cricketer
- Henry Warner (Trinidadian cricketer) (1854-1929), Trinidadian cricketer
- Henry Lee Warner (1688–1760), English landowner and politician
- Henry L. Warner (1833–1897), American farmer and politician from New York
- Henry M. Warner (1809–1875), member of the Wisconsin State Assembly
- Henry Warner (MP) (c.1551–1617), MP for Suffolk (1597) and Thetford (1601) Parliament constituencies
- H. B. Warner (1876–1958), English film and theatre actor

== See also ==
- Harry Warner (disambiguation)
