= St Giles' Church, Graffham =

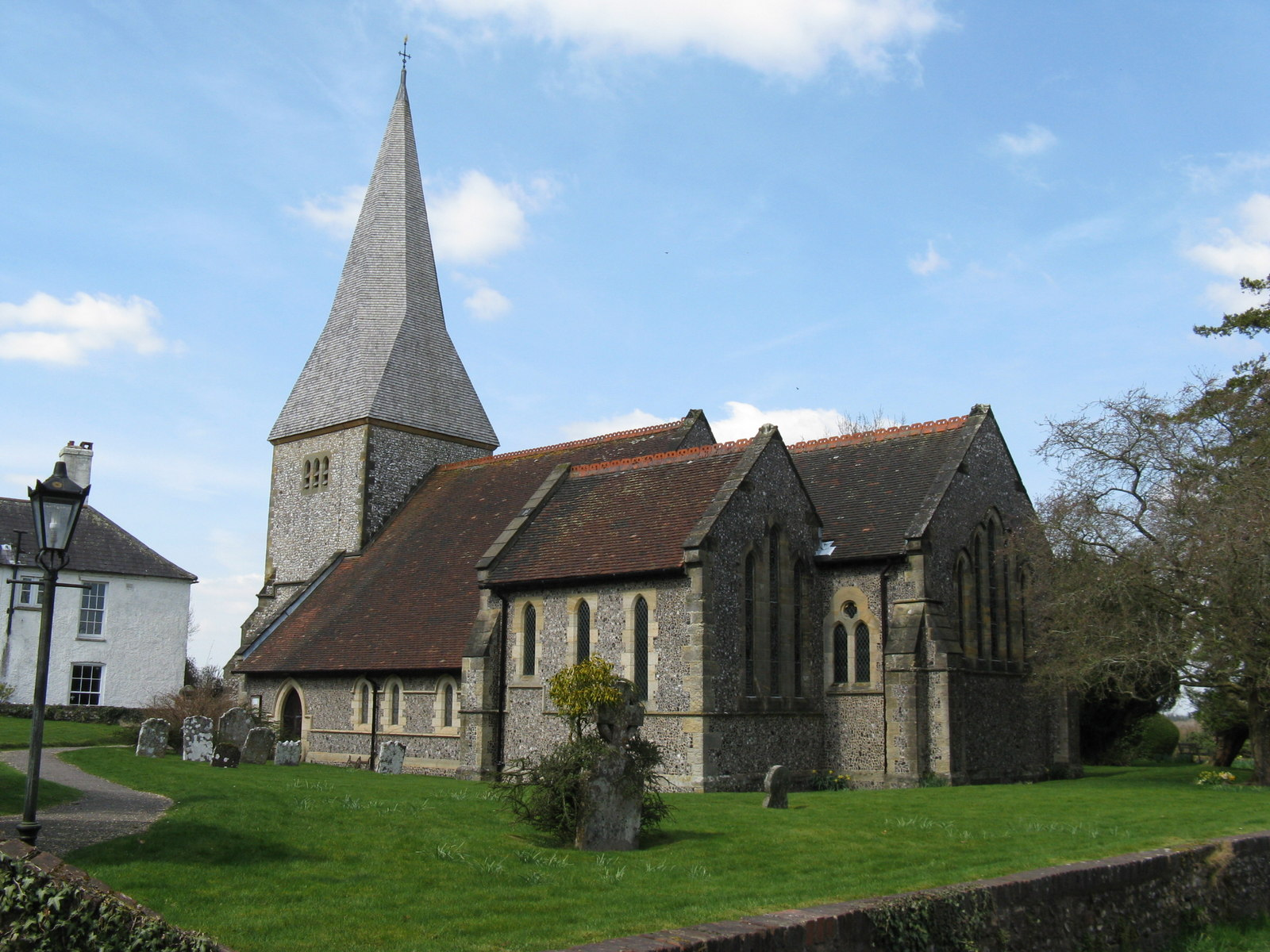
- St Giles' Church viewed from the southeast
- St Giles' Church, Graffham
- 50.9428°N 0.6795°W
- OS grid reference: SU 92869 16756
- Location: The Street, Graffham, West Sussex
- Country: England
- Denomination: Church of England

History
- Status: Grade II listed
- Dedication: Saint Giles

Architecture
- Architect: George Edmund Street (1874 restoration)
- Architectural type: Parish church
- Style: Gothic Revival (incorporating 13th-century fabric)

Specifications
- Materials: Flint with stone dressings; shingled spire

Administration
- Diocese: Chichester
- Archdeaconry: Horsham
- Deanery: Petworth
- Parish: Graffham with Woolavington

St Giles' Church is a Church of England parish church in the village of Graffham, West Sussex, England. It has 12th-century origins and retains some fabric from the medieval era, but it was rebuilt by Victorian architect George Edmund Street beginning in 1874 to commemorate the former Bishop of Oxford and Winchester Samuel Wilberforce, owner of the nearby Lavington Park estate, who had died the previous year and whose grave is in the churchyard. The tower was subsequently rebuilt by his son Arthur, and the church now has a wholly Victorian appearance. Henry Edward Manning served as rector before his conversion to Roman Catholicism. Historic England has listed the church at Grade II for its architectural and historical importance.

== History ==
A church at Graffham was mentioned in the Domesday Book of 1086. The oldest surviving record of its layout dates from the late 12th century, when it had a chancel and a nave with arcaded north and south aisles. A tower was built in the 13th century. In 1817, as part of a survey of churches in the Diocese of Chichester, it was reported that the church was "in good order" structurally.

Samuel Wilberforce, son of the abolitionist William Wilberforce, became Lord of the Manor through his marriage to Emily Sargent, whose father John served as rector of the parish. His brother-in-law, Henry Edward Manning, who had been a curate in the parish, succeeded him as rector in 1833; Manning later converted to Catholicism and became a Cardinal. In 1857, when Victorian restoration of medieval churches was popular, Wilberforce appointed George Edmund Street, one of Britain's leading ecclesiastical architects of the period, to restore the church. Wilberforce had become Bishop of Oxford in 1845 and appointed Street as the diocesan architect five years later. No work was undertaken at this time, though. In 1873, Wilberforce died in a riding accident, and Street was commissioned to rebuild the church as a memorial to him. The scheme cost £2,885, and the church was rededicated on All Saints Sunday in 1875 in a service attended by the Archbishop of Canterbury Archibald Campbell Tait.

In 1885 the original tower, which Street had retained, was found to be unsafe. Street had died in 1881, and his son Arthur rebuilt it, retaining and reinserting the west doorway. The spire was added four years later.

St Giles' Church was listed at Grade II by Historic England (formerly English Heritage) on 18 June 1959; this defines it as a "nationally important" building of "special interest". As of February 2001, there were 3,057 Grade II listed buildings, and 3,251 listed buildings of all grades, in the district of Chichester.

== Architecture ==
The church is Early English Gothic Revival in style with a "crisp" and "robust" exterior made up of high-quality hand-knapped flints of an unusually dark colour, dressed with ashlar. The only surviving external feature from the original medieval church is the west doorway, with "intricate" Early English-style detailing. The church consists of a nave with north and south aisles and arcades, chancel, tower, transeptal vestry on the north side, south chapel, organ chamber, and sacristy. Most of the timbers in the king post roof are ancient. The tower of 1887–89, which is topped with a shingled spire and in which the original doorway is set, holds three bells: one dating from the 15th century, and two others of 1621 and 1642 respectively. Despite its almost complete rebuilding, the church retains "an air of antiquity" and is situated at the end of a lane beneath the South Downs.

The south aisle has an arcade of three arches, of which the easternmost is Victorian; the other two survive from the original church and are 12th-century. They have circular piers, pointed arches with a single chamfer, and scalloped capitals, similar to the arcades of other local medieval churches. The doorway from the chancel to the north vestry was also retained from the medieval church and was reset here, and dates from the 15th century. It has a complex and unusual feature in the form of a lock and bolts with moveable knobs in the form of the heads of a king and a queen wearing a headdress with horns (the Pevsner Architectural Guides series identifies the latter head as a bishop). The font is a plain cylindrical tub-style structure of the early Norman period. There are similar examples in the nearby churches of Didling, Selham and Woolbeding.

== Burials and memorials ==
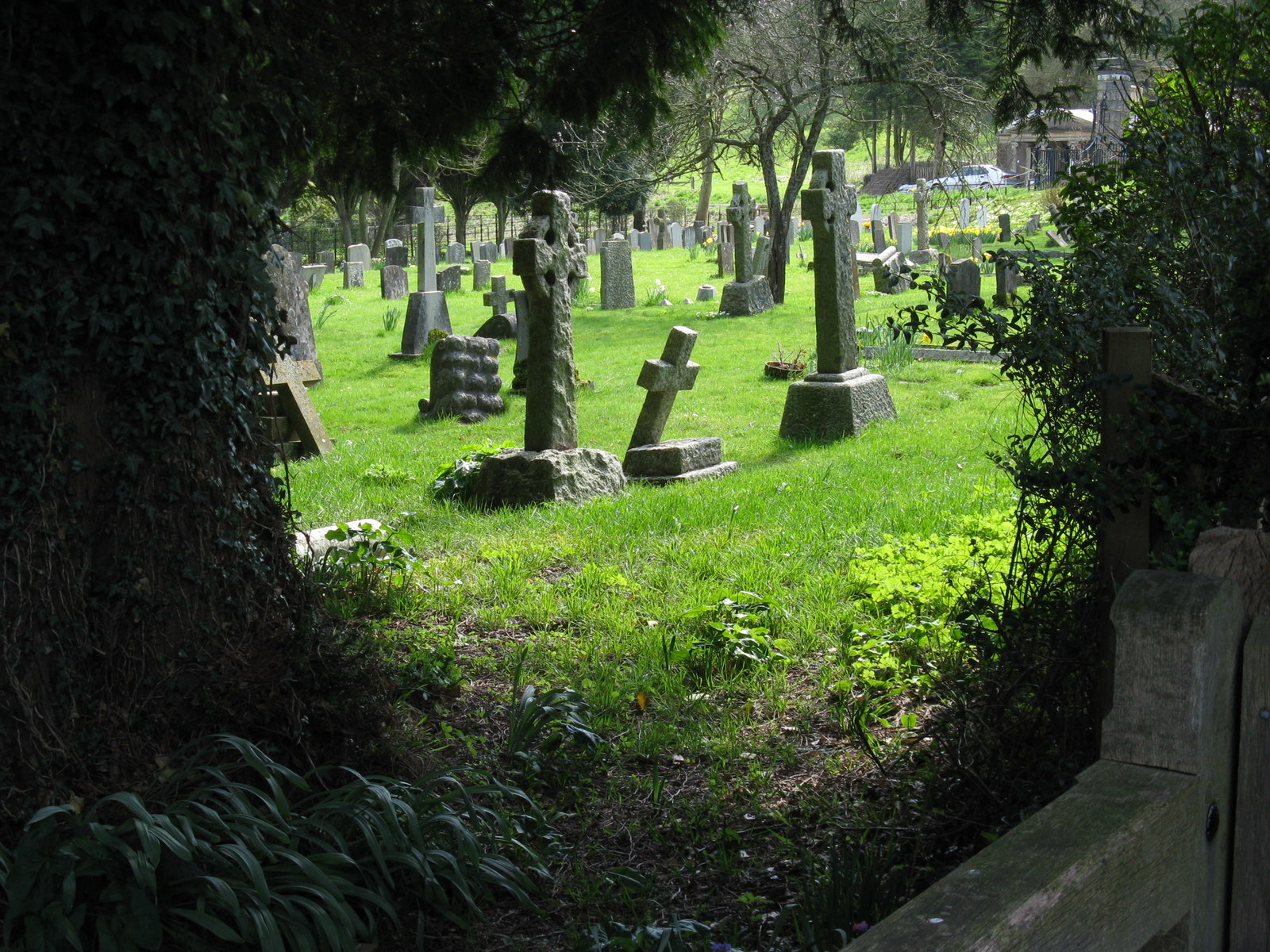
Graves at St Giles’ Church, Graffham

Although the church itself is a memorial to Bishop Samuel Wilberforce, his grave is located at the nearby St Peter's Church on the Lavington estate.

A stone war memorial tablet inside the church honours 25 men from the parish who fell in the First World War and 9 from the Second World War. Graves in the churchyard include that of Sir Geoffrey Hirst Bateman (1906–1998), a British surgeon and Olympic fencer, and the Commonwealth War Graves Commission graves of Sergeant Cyril Ambrose Snook (RAF) and Private Edwin Walter Whitcher (Royal Sussex Regiment), both of whom died in 1918.

== See also ==
- List of current places of worship in Chichester District
