= James Dean (Sussex cricketer) =

English cricketer

Personal information
- Full name: James Dean
- Born: 7 April 1842; Petworth, Sussex, England
- Died: 6 March 1869 (aged 26); Duncton, Sussex, England
- Batting: Right-handed
- Relatives: David Dean (brother); Jemmy Dean (uncle)

Domestic team information
- Years: Team
- 1862–1866: Sussex

Career statistics
| Competition | First-class |
|---|---|
| Matches | 12 |
| Runs scored | 220 |
| Batting average | 12.00 |
| 100s/50s | –/– |
| Top score | 39* |
| Balls bowled | 32 |
| Wickets | 1 |
| Bowling average | 23.00 |
| 5 wickets in innings | – |
| 10 wickets in match | – |
| Best bowling | 1/13 |
| Catches/stumpings | 5/– |
- Source: Cricinfo, 12 July 2012

James Dean (7 April 1842 – 6 March 1869) was an English cricketer. Dean was a right-handed batsman. He was born at Petworth, Sussex.

Dean made his first-class debut for Sussex against the Marylebone Cricket Club at Lord's in 1862. He made eleven further first-class appearances for the county, the last of which came against Kent in 1866 at the Bat and Ball Ground, Gravesend, In his twelve first-class appearances, he scored 220 runs at an average of 12.22, with a high score of 39 not out. With the ball, he took a single wicket.

He died at Duncton, Sussex, on 6 March 1869. His brother, David, played first-class cricket, as did Jemmy Dean, his uncle.
