= William Pellett =

English cricketer

Personal information
- Full name: William Pellett
- Born: 7 July 1809; Duncton, Sussex, England
- Batting: Unknown
- Bowling: Unknown

Domestic team information
- Years: Team
- 1837: Sussex

William Pellett (7 July 1809 – date of death unknown) was an English cricketer. Pellett's batting and bowling styles are unknown. He was born at Duncton, Sussex.

Pellett made his debut for Sussex against Nottinghamshire at the Royal New Ground, Brighton, in 1837. He made two further appearances for the Sussex in that season, against the Marylebone Cricket Club at the Royal New Ground, and a return fixture against Nottinghamshire at the Forest New Ground, Nottingham. In his three matches, he scored a total of just 26 runs at an average of 4.33, with a high score of 12.
