= John Borrer =

English cricketer

Personal information
- Full name: John Hamlin Borrer
- Born: Henfield, Sussex, England
- Died: 1854; Henfield, Sussex, England

Domestic team information
- Years: Team
- 1838: Sussex
- 1837–1838: Oxford University

Career statistics
Competition	First-class
Matches	4
Runs scored	37
Batting average	7.40
100s/50s	0/0
Top score	14
Catches/stumpings	2/–
- Source: Cricinfo, 27 January 2012

John Hamlin Borrer (date of birth unknown – 1854) was an English cricketer. Borrer's batting style is unknown. Though his date of birth is unknown, it is known he was christened at Henfield, Sussex on 2 March 1817.

While studying at the University of Oxford, Borrer made his first-class debut for Oxford University against the Marylebone Cricket Club in 1837. The following season he played a second first-class match for Oxford University against the same opposition, with both matches coming at Lord's. In that same year he made a single first-class appearance for Sussex against Kent at the Old County Ground, West Malling. He batted at number eleven in Sussex's first-innings, scoring 1 not out, while in their second-innings he was promoted to open the batting, scoring 6 runs before he was dismissed by Alfred Mynn. Borrer later made a first-class appearance for Petworth against the Marylebone Cricket Club at Lord's in 1845. He had little success in this match, scoring 2 runs at number eleven in Petworth's first-innings, before he was stumped by William Dorrinton off the bowling of William Lillywhite, while in Petworth's second-innings ended not out on 1.

He died at the village of his christening sometime in 1854. He was the nephew of the botanist William Borrer.
