= Robert Hills (cricketer, born 1813) =

English cricketer

Personal information
- Full name: Robert Hills
- Born: September 1813; Ash-Next-Ridley, Kent
- Died: 25 July 1884 (aged 70); Gravesend, Kent

Domestic team information
- Years: Team
- 1836–1838: Kent

Career statistics
Competition	First-class
Matches	7
Runs scored	51
Batting average	5.66
100s/50s	0/0
Top score	14*
Balls bowled	240
Wickets	13
Bowling average	?
5 wickets in innings	0
10 wickets in match	0
Best bowling	3/?
Catches/stumpings	3/–
- Source: Cricinfo, 28 August 2014

Robert Hills (September 1813 – 25 July 1884) was an English cricketer active in the late 1830s. Born at Ash-Next-Ridley, Kent, he was a batsman and bowler of unknown handedness who made seven known appearances in first-class cricket.

Hills made his first-class debut for Kent against Sussex in 1836 at the Old County Ground, Town Malling. He made a further appearance in 1836 in a return fixture between the teams at Brighton, before making five further first-class appearances in 1837. In seven first-class matches for Kent he scored 51 runs at an average of 5.66, with a top-score of 14 not out. As a bowler he took 13 wickets, though due to incomplete records, his bowling average is not known, but it is known the most wickets he took in a single innings was three.

He died at Gravesend, Kent on 25 July 1884.

== Bibliography ==
- Carlaw, Derek (2020). Kent County Cricketers, A to Z: Part One (1806–1914) (PDF). Cardiff: ACS.
