= Harry Warner (disambiguation) =

Harry Warner (1881–1958), co-founder of Warner Bros.

Harry Warner may also refer to:

- Harry Warner Jr. (1922–2003), journalist, science fiction fan and historian
- Harry Warner (baseball) (1928–2015), American baseball outfielder, coach and manager
- Harry Waldo Warner (1874-1945), English composer and viola player
- Harry Warner (Shortland Street), a character on the New Zealand soap opera Shortland Street

== See also ==
- Harold J. Warner (1890–1982), American attorney and judge in Oregon
- Henry Warner (disambiguation)
