= James Deane =

James Deane may refer to:

- James Deane (drift driver), Irish professional drift driver
- Jim Deane, Australian rules footballer
- Jimmy Deane, British Communist
- James Parker Deane (1812–1902), English judge

== See also ==
- James Dean (disambiguation)
