= Bodle (surname) =

Bodle is a surname. Notable people with the surname include:

- Bruce Bodle (1935–2008), New Zealand cricketer
- Charles Bodle (1788–1835), American politician
- Harold Bodle (1920–2005), British footballer
- Richard Bodle (1816–1869), British cricketer
