= Sarah Ladd =

American photographer

- Born: Sarah L. Hall; April 13, 1860; Somerville, Massachusetts, US
- Died: March 30, 1927 (aged 66); Carmel, California, US
- Known for: Photography, Landscape Photography

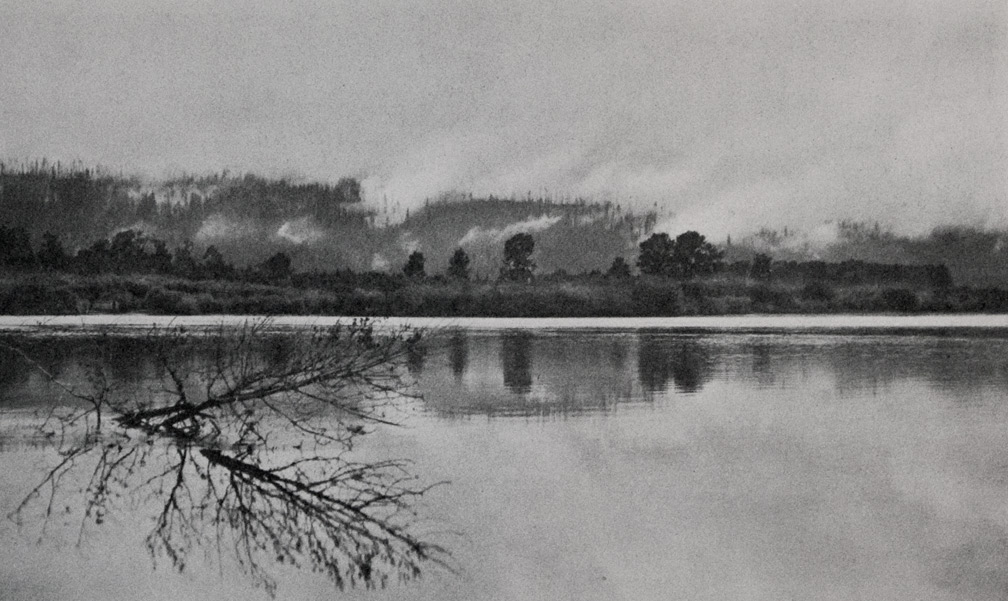
"Early Morning above Vancouver", by Sarah H. Ladd. Published in The Pacific Monthly, Vol 14 No 1, 1905

Sarah Hall Ladd (April 13, 1860 – March 30, 1927) was an early 20th-century American pictorial and landscape photographer.

== Early life ==
Ladd was born Sarah L. Hall in Somerville, Massachusetts, the daughter of John Gill Hall and Sarah Cushing. Little is known about her childhood.

On September 7, 1881, she married Charles E. Ladd, a West Coast businessman and son of early Portland (Oregon) mayor William S. Ladd. She then moved to Portland with her new husband, and they soon settled into a very comfortable life with an elegant home overlooking the Willamette River.

== Career ==
It is not known how Ladd became interested in photography or if she received any formal training. She joined the Oregon Camera Club in September 1899, and by early 1901 a number of her works were exhibited in San Francisco.

In 1902, leading New York photographer Alfred Stieglitz formed the Photo-Secession, a group of American photographers who worked to promote photographic pictorialism, and he listed Ladd as an Associate Member. It is not known how he became aware of her photography or if he had even seen her photographs, since most of those she was then taking did not accord with the pictorial tradition.

In 1903, Ladd began taking extended trips on the Columbia River on her friend and fellow photographer Lily White's custom-built houseboat, the Raysark, which contained a darkroom. Some of her most famous photographs of the river were included in an exhibition in 2008 at the Portland Art Museum, "Wild Beauty: Photographs of the Columbia River Gorge, 1867-1957".

Ladd had become a successful and highly regarded photographer by the early twentieth century, and many of her photographs were published in The Pacific Monthly magazine (founded by her husband). After about 1904, Ladd's other responsibilities took time away from her photography. She assisted her husband when he became involved in the preparations for Portland's 1905 Lewis and Clark Centennial Exposition. In 1910, the Ladds moved to Carlton, Oregon, after Charles became president of the Carlton Consolidated Lumber Company. In spite of these additional obligations, Ladd exhibited fourteen photographs at the 1915 Panama–Pacific International Exposition in San Francisco.

Ladd became prominent in the Christian Science movement from 1911. After her husband died in 1920, she moved to Carmel, California, in late 1924 to join her long-time friend Lily White.

== Death ==
Ladd died in Carmel on March 30, 1927.
