= Ethel Scarborough =

English pianist and composer (1880–1956)

Frances Ethel Scarborough (10 January 1880 – 9 December 1956) was an English pianist, composer, conductor and later a politician. Among her compositions were a Symphony, three piano concertos, solo piano music, choral music and songs.

== Education ==
She was born in Crouch End, London, the third of seven children of Walter Scarborough, a timber merchant, and his wife Matilda. She studied piano with Oscar Beringer at the Royal Academy of Music, but shifted her focus to composition and began studying at Guildhall School of Music and Drama. In 1906, while studying there, Scarborough's Piano Concerto in C minor was performed in a concert. One newspaper reported that "in the opinion of the principal of the school, [the piece is] of exceptional merit”. In 1907 and in 1908 she conducted her own compositions at similar student concerts. She later studied composition and orchestration as a private pupil of Charles Villiers Stanford. In 1907 she was awarded the Worshipful Company of Musicians' silver medal.

== Composer and conductor ==
A Symphony, dated 1909, is mentioned in some sources but there is no record of any performance. But in 1912 she conducted the Brighton Municipal Orchestra in a performance of her overture Aspiration. Two years later her Scherzo for strings was also heard at the Brighton Festival.

In 1922 Scarborough conducted her orchestral fantasy Promise at Henry Wood's Promenade Concerts, Queen's Hall. It was not well received by the critics: The Pall Mall Gazette reported that "There were tedious repetitions, and all of the other things that a composer of to-day should not do. The work was callisthenically [sic] conducted by Miss Scarborough." The Musical Times described the piece as "turgid". However, it was performed again at Bournemouth Symphony Concerts the following year.

With Horace Stevens she performed her songs, piano pieces and poems at a concert devoted to her music in the Aeolian Hall, on 18 April 1923. In the 1930s she contributed songs to the BBC radio programme Children's Hour.

== Later life ==
Scarborough turned away from music towards politics in the mid-1930s. She was active in the Conservative Party, for which she stood in Ebbw Vale against Aneurin Bevan at the 1935 United Kingdom general election, taking second place with 22.2% of the vote. She was a participant in the 1936 Jarrow March protesting against unemployment. Prior to and during World War II she was chairman of Barnet Urban District Council.

Scarborough never married. From the late 1930s she lived at Quiet Court, Perrott Lane, Graffham in Sussex, where a dispute with a neighbour came before the courts in 1945. She died at Graffham in 1956, aged 76, and was buried in the Scarborough family vault in the Lebanon Circle at Highgate Cemetery.

== Selected works ==
- Aspiration, overture (1912)
- 'Farewell', song
- Moods, suite for orchestra (1925)
- Piano Concerto No. 1 (1905)
- Piano Concerto No. 2 (1908)
- Piano Concerto No. 3
- Promise, a fantasy for orchestra (Proms, 1922)
- Scherzo for strings (Brighton Festival, 1914)
- Symphony (1909)
- Two Songs, bass voice with orchestral accompaniment (1908)
  - 'The secret of the sea' (text: Scarborough)
  - 'The De'il's awa' wi' the Exciseman'
