= Robert Picknell =

English cricketer

Personal information
- Full name: Robert Picknell
- Born: 2 June 1816; Chalvington, Sussex, England
- Died: 7 February 1869 (aged 52); Eastbourne, Sussex, England
- Batting: Right-handed
- Relatives: George Picknell (brother)

Domestic team information
- Years: Team
- 1839–1845: Sussex
- 1837: Sussex

Career statistics
Competition	First-class
Matches	18
Runs scored	182
Batting average	5.51
100s/50s	–/–
Top score	23
Balls bowled	–
Wickets	–
Bowling average	–
5 wickets in innings	–
10 wickets in match	–
Best bowling	–
Catches/stumpings	5/–
- Source: Cricinfo, 10 July 2012

Robert Picknell (2 June 1816 – 7 February 1869) was an English cricketer. Picknell was a right-handed batsman. He was born at Chalvington, Sussex.

Picknell made his first-class debut for Sussex against Kent in 1837 at the Old County Ground, West Malling. He made three further first-class appearances in that season, against the Marylebone Cricket Club at Lord's, Kent at the Royal New Ground, and Nottinghamshire at the Forest New Ground. In 1839, Sussex County Cricket Club was formed, with Picknell playing in their inaugural first-class match against the Marylebone Cricket Club at Lord's on 10 June 1839. He made twelve further first-class appearances for Sussex, the last of which came against the Marylebone Cricket Club at Lord's in 1845. In total, he made eighteen first-class appearances during his career, scoring 182 runs at an average of 5.51, with a high score of 23.

He died at Eastbourne, Sussex, on 7 February 1869. His brother, George, also played first-class cricket.
