= George Murrell =

English cricketer

Domestic team information
- Years: Team
- 1826–1828: Sussex

Career statistics
Competition	First-class
Matches	2
Runs scored	0
Batting average	0.00
100s/50s	0/0
Top score	0*
Catches/stumpings	0/–
- Source: Cricinfo, 27 December 2011

George Murrell (dates of birth and death unknown) was an English cricketer. Murrell's batting style is unknown. He was christened at Stoughton, Sussex on 31 January 1790.

Murrell made two first-class appearances for Sussex, both against Kent in 1826 and 1828. In the 1826 match at Hawkhurst Moor, Murrell was dismissed for a duck twice. Firstly in Sussex's first-innings of 23 all out, though the bowler who dismissed him is not recorded, and secondly by Horace Bates in Sussex's second-innings total of 43 al out. Kent, who had been dismissed for 62 in their first-innings won the match by 9 wickets. In the 1828 match at the Vine Cricket Ground, Kent were dismissed for 37 in their first-innings, with Sussex making 35 in response. Murrell was one of seven ducks in the innings when he was dismissed by Ashby. Kent made 53 in their second-innings, leaving Sussex with a target of 56, which they failed to chase down, managing just 23. Murrell was unbeaten on 0. These were his only major appearances for Sussex.
