= AV (cyclecar) =

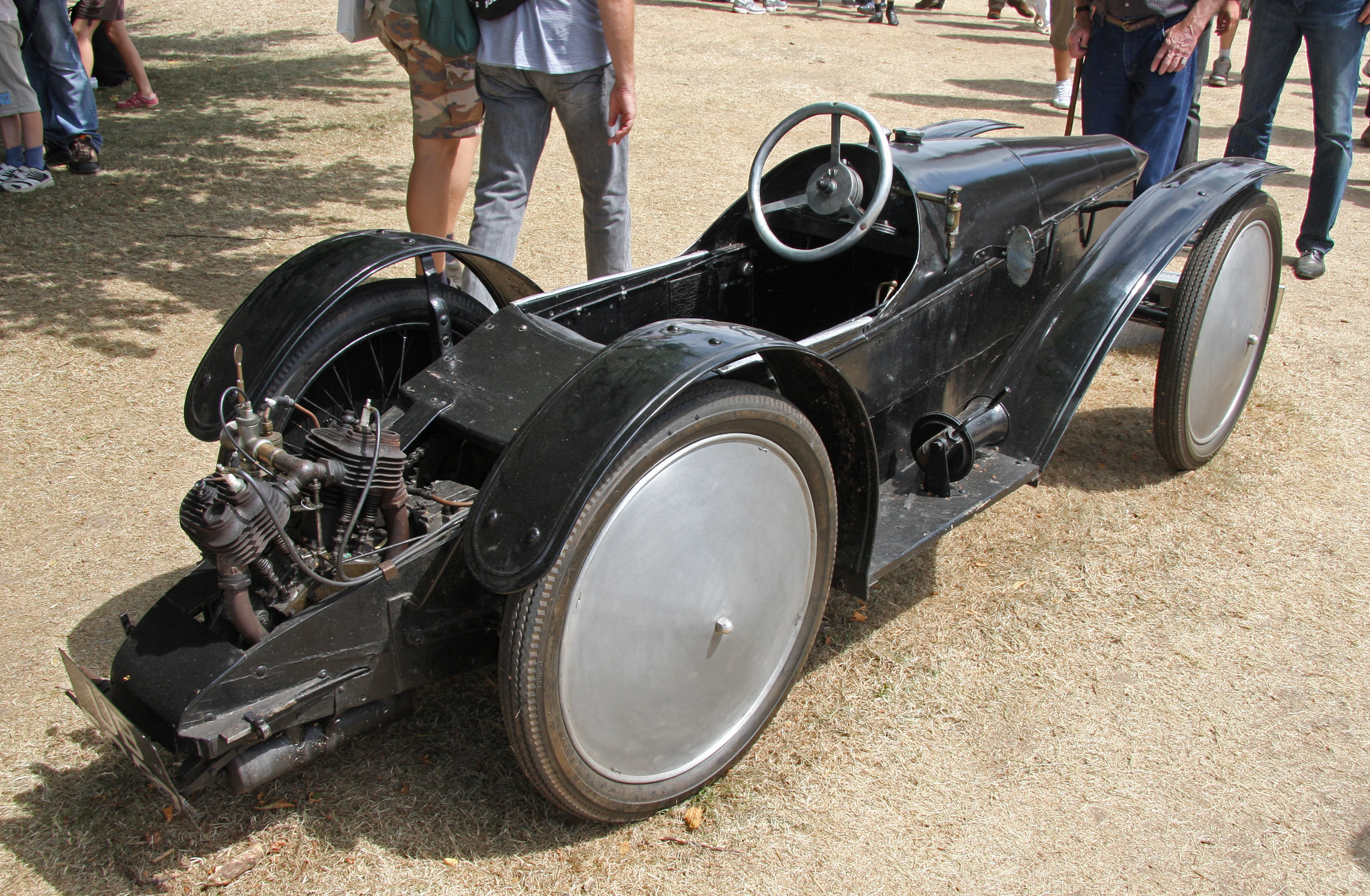
1919 AV Monocar

The AV was a British cyclecar manufactured by Ward and Avey in Somerset Road, Teddington Middlesex between 1919 and 1924.

It was one of the more successful cyclecars and was based on a design bought from Carden and built in the factory that they had previously used. At the peak they had 80 employees.

The first model was a single-seater, the Monocar, only 30 inches (760 mm) wide with bodies built by the Thames Valley Pattern Works out of wood, plywood or even compressed paper. The complete car only weighed about 550 pounds (250 kg). Engines were rear mounted, air-cooled and rated from 5 to 8hp. There was a choice of JAP (most commonly), Blackburne or rarely MAG units. Gearboxes were either a two-speed epicyclic unit with foot-operated change or three-speed Sturmey-Archer with chain drive to the rear axle. Steering was by a wire and bobbin system with the entire front axle being pivoted on early cars. Several hundreds of these cars were made.

The Monocar was described by Ixion of The Motor Cycle as "a low, coffin-shape projectile, moderately attractive in dense fog.

In 1920 a two-seater, the Bi-car, was added with the passenger behind the driver. The width of the car increased to 36 inches. About 50 were made. A more conventional side by side model was added in 1921 called the Runabout with a 42-inch (1,100 mm) body 126 inches (3,200 mm) long. The original Monocar and Bi-car were dropped in 1922 but production of the Runabout continued until 1924 and later to special order.

The company changed its name in 1923 to A.V. Motors Ltd and after the end of car production became Jowett and later Rootes Group dealers.

== See also ==
- List of car manufacturers of the United Kingdom
