= Carden (cyclecar) =

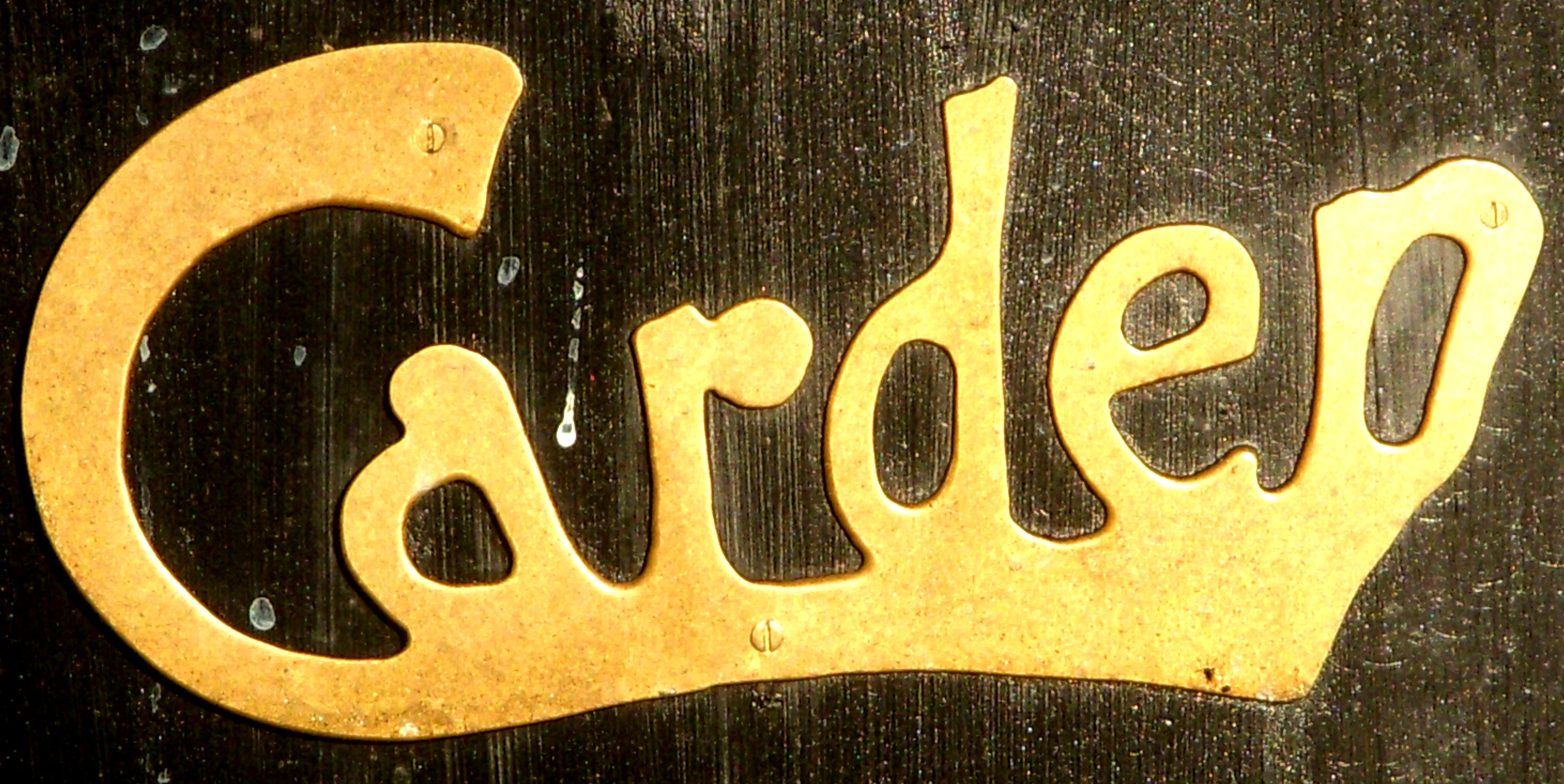
- Carden logo

Overview
- Manufacturer: Carden Engineering
- Production: 1913-1925

Body and chassis
- Class: cyclecar
- Body style: single seat open

Powertrain
- Engine: 480 cc single cylinder JAP or 654 cc V twin

Dimensions
- Wheelbase: 78 inches (1980 mm)
- Length: 120 inches (3050 mm)
- Width: 32 inches (813 mm)

Chronology
- Successor: none

The Carden was a British 4 wheeled cyclecar made from 1914 by Carden Engineering originally based in Farnham, Surrey but moving in 1914 to Teddington, Middlesex and in 1919 to Ascot, Berkshire.

Sir John Carden was a prolific designer who went on to work on tanks but started his career with cyclecars. His first design was a wooden bodied single seater powered by a 481 cc single cylinder JAP engine driving the back axle by belt. There was no gearbox. At first he had built the cars at his home but demand was sufficient to warrant moving to larger premises in Teddington in February 1914.

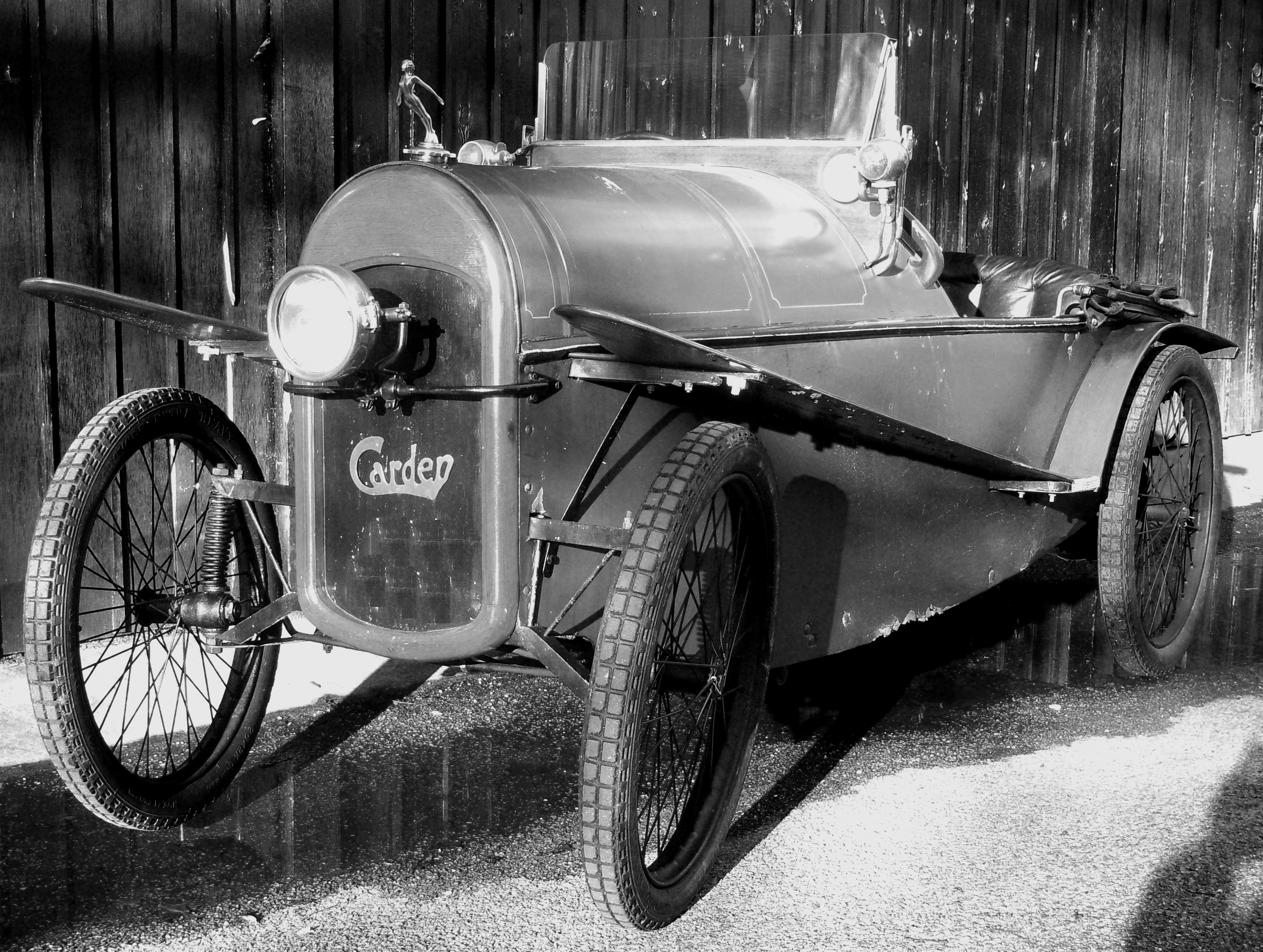
Carden cyclecar

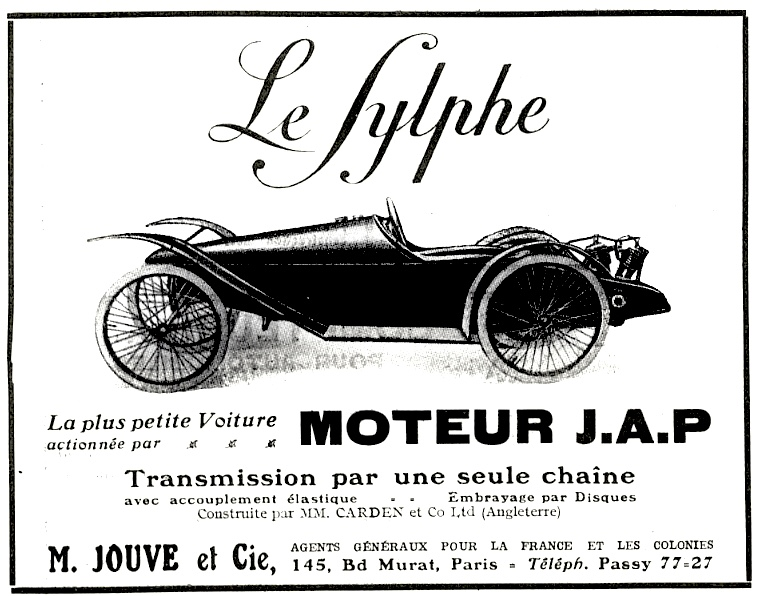
Carden cyclecar „Le Sylphe“ (1914)

In October 1914 The Motor Cycle reported on a Carden Monocar they had on trial. This vehicle (registration MXY1) was powered by an air-cooled 5HP V-twin JAP engine, and had only a single gear, though gears were available on 'other models'. The engine was mounted behind the rear axle and drove it via chain, there being no differential. The optional gear change was a mechanism whereby one chain sprocket was disengaged and another moved to drive the chain.

In 1916 the design and factory was sold to Ward and Avey Ltd who renamed the car the AV and continued manufacture until about 1924.

Production, including those made by AV, may have reached 1000.

Carden went on to design a new cyclecar in 1919 which he sold later the same year to Tamplin and then a further model which he sold to Arnott and Harrison in 1922 who sold it as the New Carden and made the car until 1925.

== See also ==
- List of car manufacturers of the United Kingdom
