= Lilywhites =

(The) Lilywhites is a nickname of many sports teams, typically because they play in white clothing.

== Association football ==
=== England ===
- Berkhamsted Town
- Bromley F.C.
- Cambridge City F.C.
- Faversham Town F.C.
- Fulham F.C.
- Hereford United F.C.
- Leyton F.C.
- Mossley A.F.C.
- Preston North End F.C.
- Tottenham Hotspur F.C.

=== Elsewhere ===
- Dundalk F.C., Ireland
- Clachnacuddin F.C., Scotland
- Rhyl F.C., Wales
- Eastern Suburbs A.F.C, New Zealand

== Other ==
- Kildare GAA, Gaelic games
- Coldstream Guards, British infantry regiment

== See also ==
- Lillywhites, a sports retail store in London
- Lily White (disambiguation)
