= William Jenkins (cricketer) =

English cricketer

Personal information
- Full name: William Jenkins
- Born: 1788; England
- Died: 27 July 1844; Selham, Sussex, England
- Batting: Unknown

Domestic team information
- Years: Team
- 1826–1830: Sussex

William Jenkins (1788 – 27 July 1844) was an English cricketer. Jenkins' batting style is unknown.

Jenkins made his debut for Sussex against a combined Hampshire and Surrey at Petworth Park in 1826. He made two further appearances for Sussex, against the same opponents in a return fixture at Bramshill Park in that same season, and against Surrey at Midhurst in 1830. In his three matches, he scored a total of 52 runs at an average of 10.40, with a high score of 17.

He died at Selham, Sussex on 27 July 1844.
