= Pickrell =

Pickrell is a surname. Notable people with the surname include:

- E. R. Pickrell (1858–1894), American politician
- Ray Pickrell (1938–2006), English short-circuit motorcycle road racer
- Riley Pickrell (born 2001), Canadian cyclist
- Robert Pickrell (1922–2017), American politician
- Tony Pickrell (1942–2015), Welsh footballer

== See also ==
- Picknell, surname
- Pickrel, surname
- Pickrell, Nebraska
- Tamsin Pickeral (born 1971), art historian
