= Lily White (photographer) =

American landscape photographer (1866–1944)

- Born: May 10, 1866; Oregon City, Oregon
- Died: November 14, 1944 (aged 78); Carmel-by-the-Sea, California
- Known for: Photography

Lily Edith White (1866–1944), also known as Lily E. White, was an early 20th-century American landscape photographer. She is best known for photographs taken when she was living aboard her custom-built houseboat, the Raysark, while traveling Oregon's Columbia River with her friend and fellow photographer, Sarah Ladd Hall. White lived and worked for most of her life in Portland, Oregon and the nearby Columbia River Gorge.

== Education and early life ==
White was born into a wealthy and influential Portland family. After finishing her education in a local public school, she studied art at the California School of Design (now the San Francisco Art Institute) and the Art Institute of Chicago.

In 1886, she worked as a clerk for W.B. Aye, a Portland bookseller, stationer, and printer. Between 1889 and 1890, White clerked at J.K. Gill stationers and Olds and King department store. In 1891, she worked as a bookkeeper for the photographer W.H. Hunt. White listed herself as "artist" in the 1892 Portland city directory. However, she engaged in photography for creative expression, not for income.

== Artwork ==
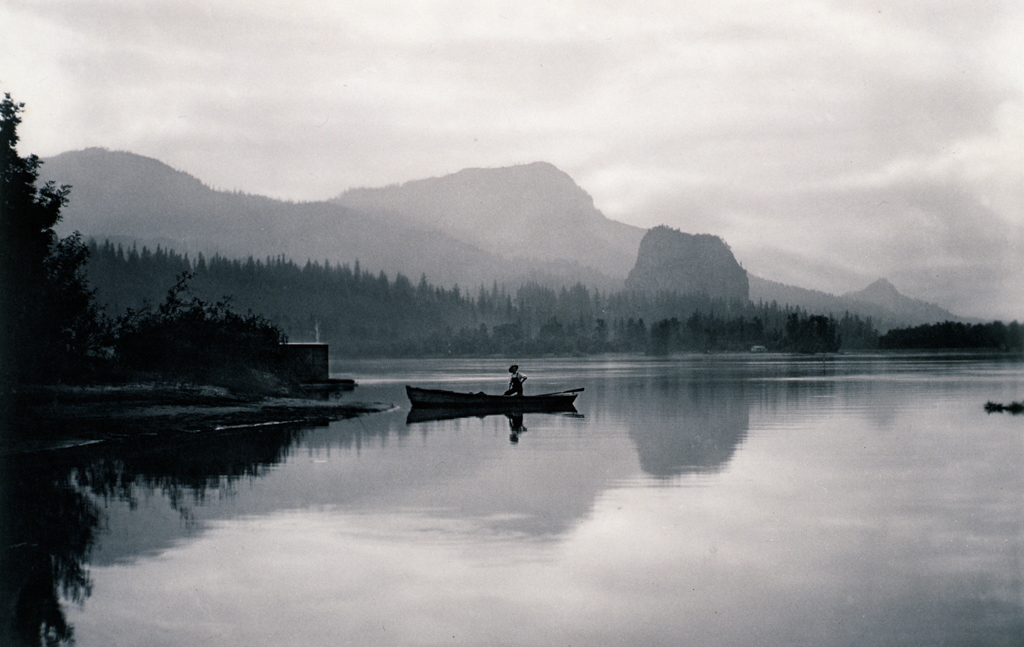
Lily E. White, Evening on the Columbia, 1903/1905, platinum print, collection of the Portland Art Museum

White's photographs are platinum prints in a range of black, brown and gray hues. Her work features natural landscapes, flowers, and Northwest Native Americans.

A representative example is Evening on the Columbia, circa 1903 to 1905. The foreground is a large glassy expanse of calm water. The center shows a relaxed figure standing in a rowboat. Near the boat is a rectangular structure topped by a thin bright reflection and a narrow column of white smoke rising into the air. This structure may be White's houseboat. The background shows a rock monolith and low but rugged tree-covered mountains. The Portland Art Museum owns a print of this photograph, along with a number of White's other photographs.

== Photography career ==
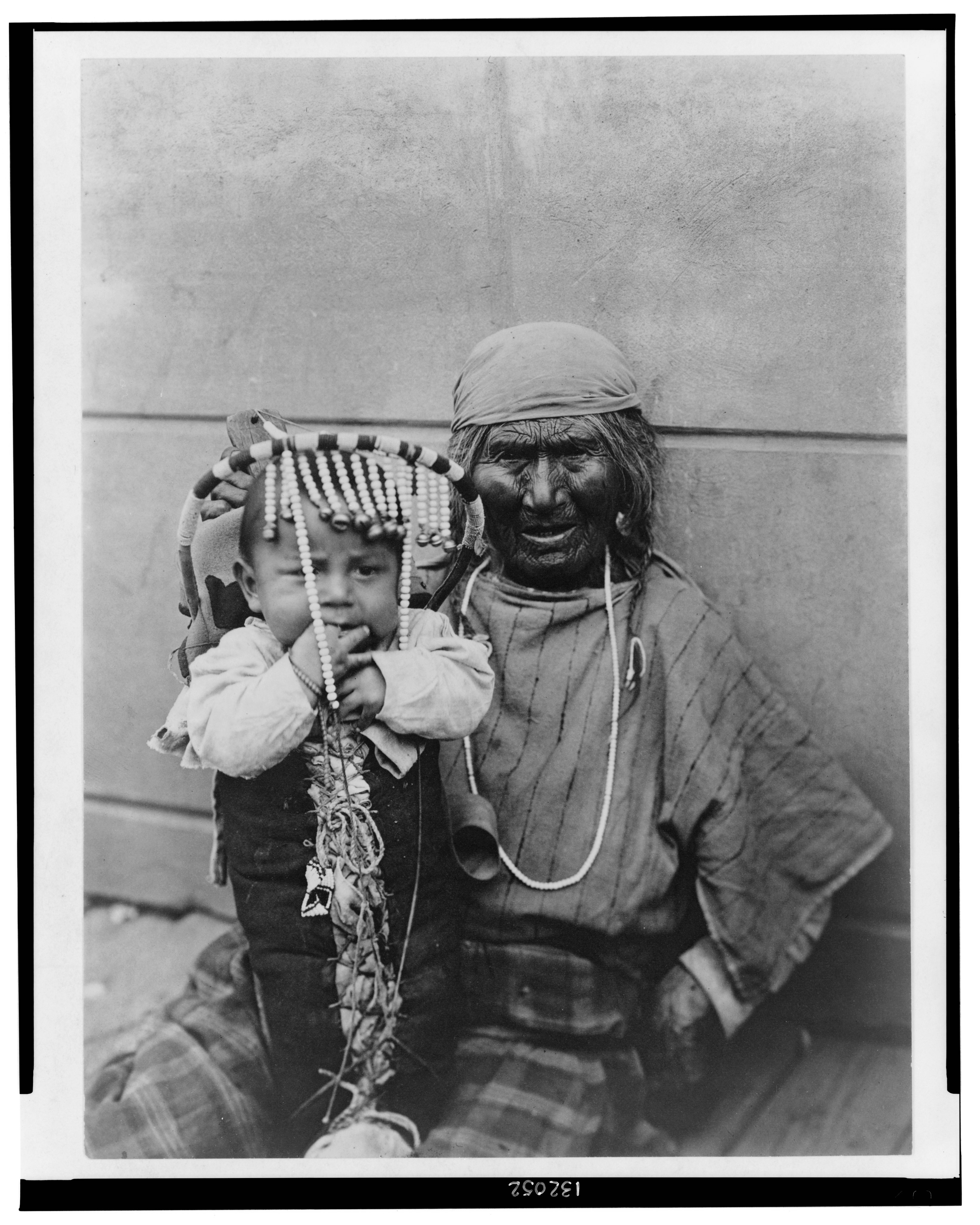
Lily E. White, Periods of time, c. 1902

White was elected a member of the Oregon Camera Club on March 3, 1898. At that time, the club was considered an important factor in the leisure and aesthetic life of Portland, reaching a large number of people who might not otherwise have been interested in photography. The club employed her as the secretary and she held the role of club "demonstrator", meaning teacher.

For unknown reasons, White resigned from the club on June 14, 1904.

Early in 1901, The Camera Club of New York elected White as a nonresident member. Recognition of her work by the photographic power base of New York City, especially Alfred Stieglitz, was important. Stieglitz could influence a photographer's future by accepting or rejecting the person's work in exhibitions and publications. As editor of Camera Notes, the journal of The Camera Club of New York, he was in a position to accept works or return photographs, sometimes with deflating comments.

When Stieglitz formed Photo-Secession, an elite group of American photographers who promoted photography as art, he included White among its first elected associate members on February 13, 1903. The group affiliation enabled her to associate with like-minded photographers and to have the chance to participate in Photo-Secession exhibitions in Europe and America.

In the spring of 1903, White's houseboat, the Raysark, was towed up the Columbia River. Thereafter it was often anchored near Lyle, Washington, a shipping port for wheat and sheep 82 miles (132 km) east of Portland. White had supervised the boat's construction, and the Raysark was built to accommodate her personal needs. The houseboat included cabins for guests and a darkroom for photo development.

== Later life and death ==
The record of White's photographic output diminishes after 1905. Records show active involvement in the Christian Science Church, along with her friend and fellow photographer Sarah Ladd. In 1923, White moved to Carmel-by-the-Sea, California, where Ladd joined her in late 1924. Ladd was diagnosed with cancer and died on March 30, 1927. White remained in Carmel-by-the-Sea until her death on November 14, 1944.
