= William Hodson (cricketer, born 1808) =

English cricketer

William Hodson (christened 20 February 1808) was an English cricketer who played for Sussex. He was born in Brighton.

Hodson made a single first-class appearance, during the 1808 season, against England. Batting in the tailend, Hodson scored a duck in each innings in which he batted.

Another William Hodson, of unknown relation, played first-class cricket between 1860 and 1863.
