= Bill Pickett (lawyer) =

American lawyer

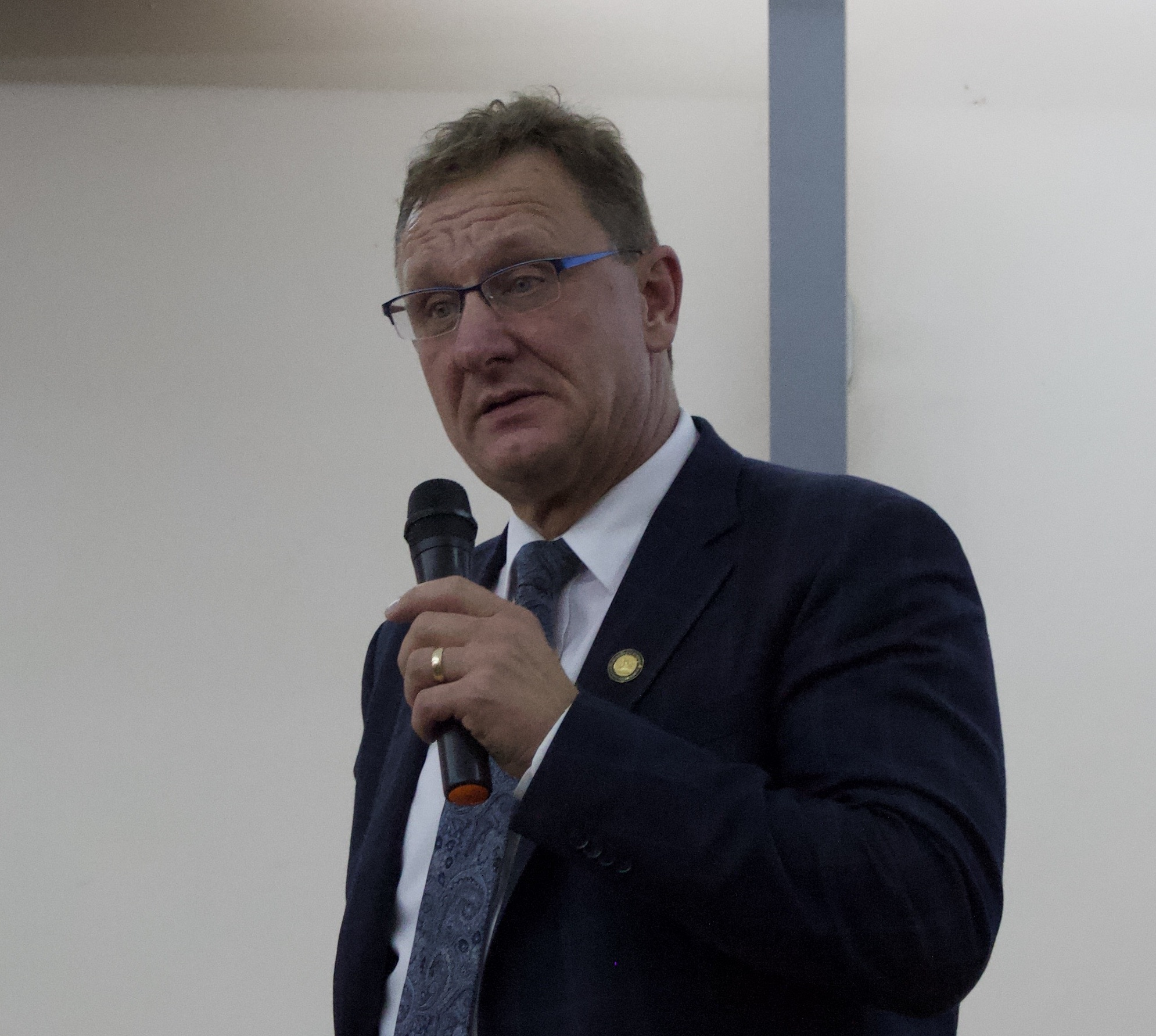
- Born: William Dalson Pickett; December 14, 1963 (age 62); Yakima, Washington, U.S.
- Education: University of Washington (BA); Lewis & Clark College (JD); Temple University (LLM)
- Occupation: Lawyer
- Political party: Republican
- Spouse: Laura Cavanaugh (m. 1990)
- Children: 3

William Pickett (born December 14, 1963) is an American lawyer and former President of the Washington State Bar Association. Pickett has been a licensed attorney since 1997, practicing in personal injury, wrongful death, civil rights, and medical malpractice matters. He is best known for his work in lawsuits and litigation, and personal injury. He is a partner at Larson Griffee & Pickett Law Firm.

== Early life and education ==
Pickett attended the University of Washington, where in 1994 he received a Bachelor of Arts in Society and Justice - making him the first person in his family to graduate from college. He then attended the Northwestern School of Law of Lewis & Clark College, receiving a Juris Doctor in 1997. Much later in life he attended the Temple University Beasley School of Law, receiving a Masters of Law in Trial Advocacy. Most recently in 2012, Pickett attended the Trial Lawyers College in Dubois, Wyoming.

== Legal practice ==
After passing the Washington State Bar Exam in early 1998, Pickett accepted was hired as an associate attorney at the Yakima firm of Lyon, Weigand, & Gustafson. In an interview Pickett said, "The insurer doesn’t come with a story — they just want to protect their money” He continued, “But people come to you with a story. Injured, they can’t work, no money, unable to pay bills and sometimes lose everything as a result.”

== Notable cases ==
He was involved in two high-profile cases: Arias v. Yakima Police Department and Ford v. City of Yakima.

== Personal life ==
Pickett married Laura Cavanaugh on March 10, 1990 at Bethany Presbyterian Church in Seattle, Washington. They have three children: Jack, Grant, and Madeline.
