= Michael Botting =

English cricketer

Personal information
- Full name: Michael Botting
- Batting: Unknown

Domestic team information
- Years: Team
- 1829: Sussex

Career statistics
Competition	First-class
Matches	1
Runs scored	11
Batting average	11.00
100s/50s	–/–
Top score	9*
Balls bowled	–
Wickets	–
Bowling average	–
5 wickets in innings	–
10 wickets in match	–
Best bowling	–
Catches/stumpings	–/–
- Source: Cricinfo, 18 December 2011

Michael Botting (dates of birth and death unknown) was an English cricketer. Botting's batting style is unknown. Although his date of birth is not recorded, it is known he was christened on 8 January 1795 at Wiston, Sussex.

Botting made a single first-class appearance for Sussex against Kent at the Royal New Ground, Brighton in 1829. Kent were dismissed for 96 in their first-innings, in response Sussex were dismissed for 77, with Botting ending the innings unbeaten on 9. Kent were dismissed for just 44 in their second-innings, in response Sussex made 66/8 to win the match by 2 wickets, with Botting scoring 2 runs in that innings, though which bowler took his wicket is not recorded.
