= Horace Bates =

English cricketer

Personal information
- Born: 19 August 1793; Egerton, Kent,
- Died: 14 December 1879 (aged 86); Charing, Kent

Domestic team information
- Years: Team
- 1822–1832: The Bs
- 1823–1826: Kent
- FC debut: 12 August 1822 The Bs v England
- Last FC: 4 June 1832 The Bs v Marylebone Cricket Club (MCC)
- Source: CricInfo, 20 June 2022

Horace Bates (19 August 1793 – 14 December 1879) was an English cricketer who played from 1822 to 1832.

Bates was born at Egerton in Kent in 1793. He was a miller and butcher who played club cricket for Lenham, Leeds and Bearsted. He was described as a "tall, strong and heavily built" man who hit the ball powerfully but was "by no means to be depended upon".

Primarily a bowler, Bates played in a total of nine important matches, five for The Bs and four for Kent. He made his important debut for The Bs against England (Note: During the time Bates played, England teams were not representative of the country. Instead, they were teams composed of players from a range of locations brought together to play against another team. So when Bates made his important debut against England in 1822 he played against a team made up of players from other parts of the country, including Hampshire, Sussex, Surrey and Kent.) in August 1822 at Lord's, and first played for Kent the following season. He took a total of 14 wickets for the B's, playing alongside well-known cricketers such as Billy Beldham and Lord Frederick Beauclerk, although he was less successful in the matches he played for Kent and is known to have taken 20 wickets at important level. (Note: In the period Bates played, wickets taken by bowlers were normally only recorded if they were bowled. Other means of dismissal were not credited to any bowler. As a result the number of wickets he took is uncertain, with the total of 20 being a minimum.) As well as his important matches, Bates is known to have played for the Players of Kent (Note: Players were professional cricketers who were paid to play, as opposed to amateurs who were usually gentlemen who played for sport.) in 1826 and 1827.

Bates married; his wife Elizabeth came from Charing. The couple had seven children. In later life he is described as being an annuitant. He died at Charing in December 1879 aged 86.

== Bibliography ==
- Birley, Derek (1999). A Social History of English Cricket. London: Aurum Press. ISBN 978-18-54107-10-7 – via Internet Archive.
- Carlaw, Derek (2020). Kent County Cricketers, A to Z: Part One (1806–1914) (PDF). Cardiff: ACS.
- Haygarth, Arthur (1996) [1862]. Scores & Biographies, Volume 1 (1744–1826). Kennington: Frederick Lillywhite. ISBN 978-19-00592-23-9.
- Haygarth, Arthur (1997) [1862]. Scores & Biographies, Volume 2 (1827–1840). Kennington: Frederick Lillywhite. ISBN 978-19-00592-23-9.
