= Charles E. Goad =

British cartographer and engineer

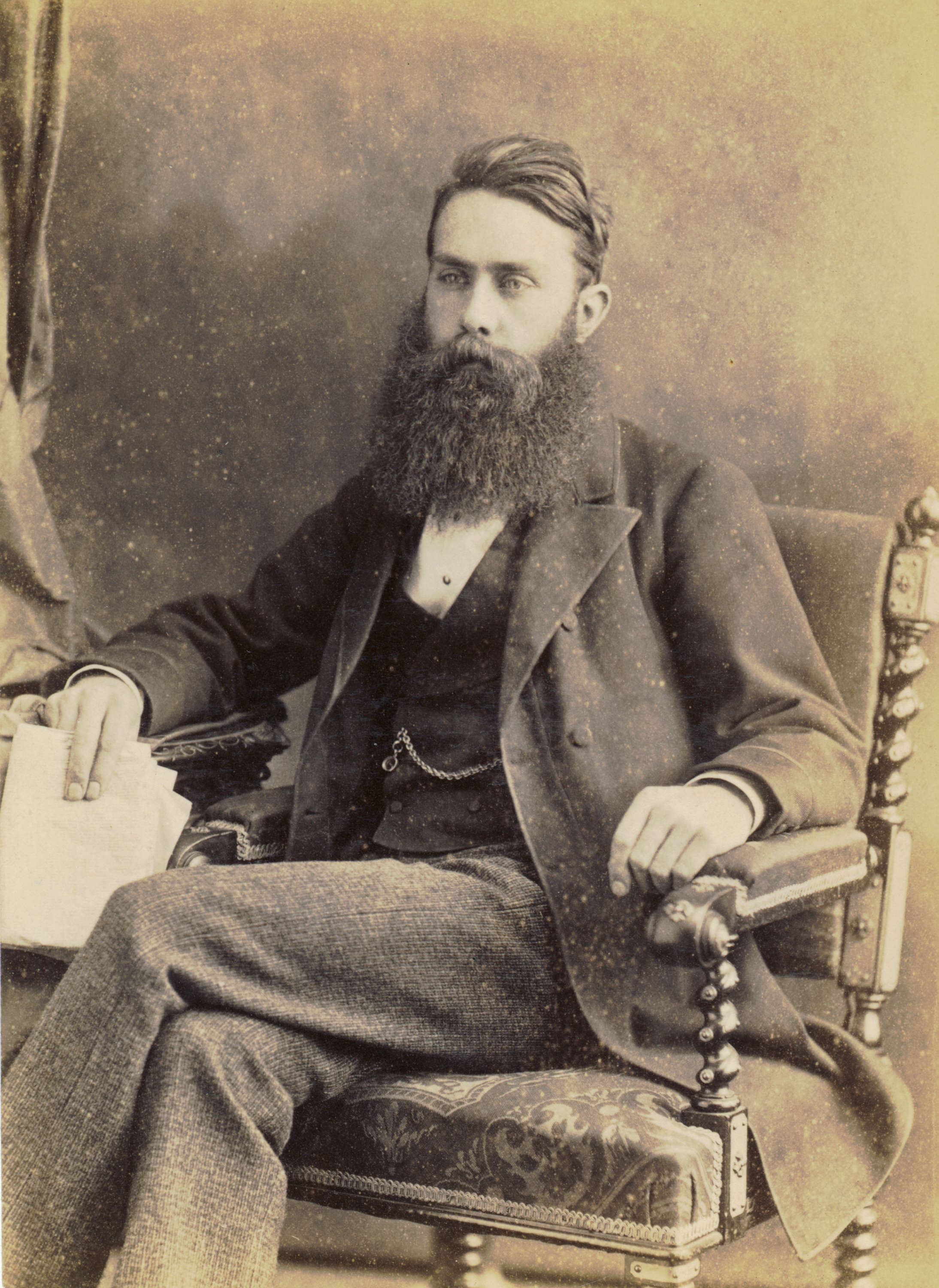
- Born: March 15, 1848; Camberwell, Surrey, England
- Died: June 10, 1910 (aged 62); Toronto, Ontario, Canada
- Occupations: cartographer and civil engineer

Charles Edward Goad (March 15, 1848 – June 10, 1910 ) was a noted cartographer and civil engineer. Goad is most noted for his insurance surveys of cities in Canada, Great Britain, and elsewhere. Fire insurance companies needed to know in detail the nature and size of buildings, width of streets, construction, building materials and the proximity of fire services and water supplies in order to estimate appropriate premiums. Goad established a company (the Charles E. Goad Company) in 1875 in Montreal, Quebec, Canada to produce maps to provide this information. These and like maps are now referred to as Goad maps. Goad returned to England in 1885 and began work in Britain.

Goad was a member of the following societies:

- American Society of Civil Engineers
- Canadian Society of Civil Engineers
- London Chamber of Commerce & Industry
- Engineers' Club of New York
- Statistical Society of London
- Imperial Institute

The Goad trademark is now a part of Experian.

Goad died in Toronto in 1910.

Charles E. Goad Company continued business after Goad's death but stopped insurance work in 1917 and ceased cartographic business in Canada by 1931 when it was acquired by Underwriter's Survey Limited.

== See also ==
- fire insurance maps of England
