= Henry Lillywhite =

English cricketer

Henry Lillywhite (31 December 1789 at Hawkley, Hampshire – 30 January 1858 at Ropley, Hampshire) was an English amateur cricketer who played from 1816 to 1825. He was mainly associated with Hampshire and made seven known appearances in important matches.

== Bibliography ==
- Arthur Haygarth, Scores & Biographies, Volumes 1-2 (1744–1840), Lillywhite, 1862
