= James Dean (Oxford University cricketer) =

English cricketer

Personal information
- Full name: Philip James Dean
- Born: 4 June 1955 (age 71); Skipton, Yorkshire, England
- Batting: Left-handed

Domestic team information
- Years: Team
- 1978: Oxford University

Career statistics
Competition	First-class
Matches	2
Runs scored	75
Batting average	18.75
100s/50s	–/–
Top score	39
Catches/stumpings	8/–
- Source: Cricinfo, 30 May 2020

Philip James Dean (born 4 June 1955) is an English former first-class cricketer and British Army officer.

Dean was born at Skipton in June 1955. Dean later attended the Royal Military Academy Sandhurst. He was commissioned into the 10th Princess Mary's Own Gurkha Rifles as a second lieutenant in June 1974, with him being confirmed in the rank in December of the same year. He was promoted to lieutenant in June 1976. During his commission, he concurrently studied at Mansfield College at the University of Oxford. While studying at Oxford, Dean made two appearances in first-class cricket for Oxford University against Sussex and Glamorgan at Oxford in 1978. He scored a total of 75 runs in these matches, with a high score of 39.

After graduating from Oxford he continued to serve in the Gurkha Rifles, being promoted to captain in December 1980. Dean retired from active service in August 1984, retaining the rank of captain. During his time in the army, he played minor matches for the British Army cricket team.
