= Graffham =

Village and parish in West Sussex, England

Coordinates: 50.94989°N 0.68077°W

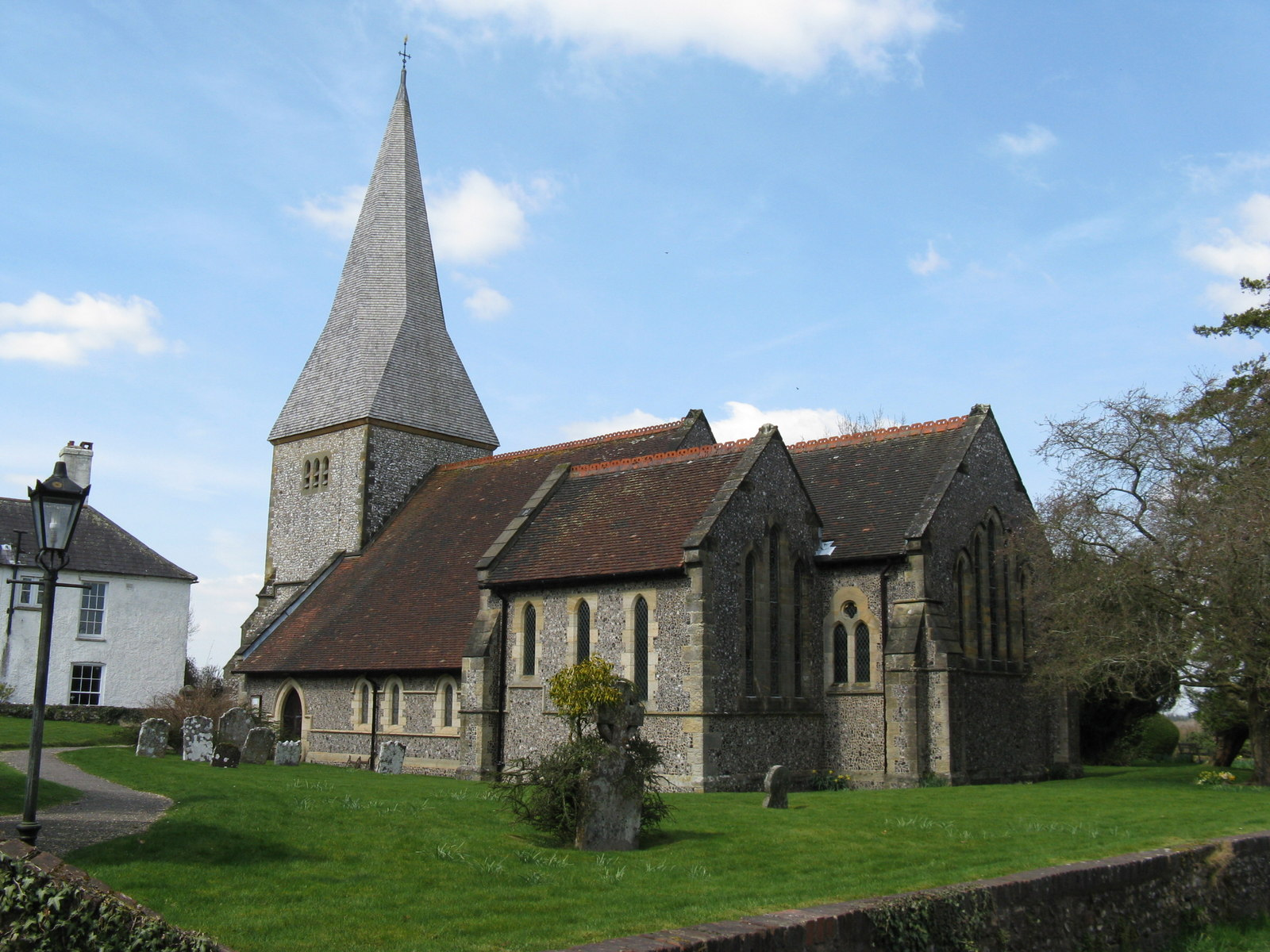
- Parish church of St Giles, Graffham

- Location within West Sussex
- Area: 11.81 km^{2} (4.56 sq mi)
- Population: 516. 2011 Census
  - Density: 43/km^{2} (110/sq mi)
- OS grid reference: SU927175
  - London: 45 miles (72 km) NNE
- Civil parish: Graffham
- District: Chichester
- Shire county: West Sussex
- Region: South East
- Country: England
- Sovereign state: United Kingdom
- Post town: PETWORTH
- Postcode district: GU28
- Dialling code: 01798
- Police: Sussex
- Fire: West Sussex
- Ambulance: South East Coast
- UK Parliament: Arundel and South Downs
- Website: https://graffham-pc.uk/

Graffham is a village, Anglican parish and civil parish in West Sussex, England, situated on the northern escarpment of the South Downs within the South Downs National Park. The civil parish is made up of the village of Graffham, part of the hamlet of Selham, and South Ambersham. It forms part of the Bury Ward for the purposes of electing a Councillor to Chichester District Council.

== History ==
Graffham was listed in the Domesday Book (1086) in the ancient hundred of Easebourne as having 13 households: seven villagers and six smallholders; with land for ploughing, woodland for pigs and a church, the parish's value to the lord of the manor was £8.

In the 1861 census, the parish covered 1,658 acres (671 ha) and had a population of 410. Selham was still a separate parish covering 1,042 acres (422 ha) with a population of 123.

== Demography ==
In the 2001 census, the parish covered 11.81 km^{2} (2,917 acres) and had 229 households with a total population of 510 of whom 229 residents were economically active. The population at the 2021 Census was 517.

== Amenities ==
The village of Graffham contains three pubs The Forester's Arms, The Woodcote (formerly The White Horse), and The Three Moles (just across the parish boundary in Selham), a recreation ground, a village shop, the Anglican parish church of St Giles, which was largely rebuilt between 1874 and 1887, and a primary school. Seaford College, an independent school, is close by.

== Notable people ==
- Timothy Bell, Baron Bell (1941-2019), advertising and public relations executive
- Ann Dally (1926-2007), author and psychiatrist.
- Henry Edward Manning (1808-1892), cleric, curate to John Sargent
- Harry Ricardo (1885-1974), engineer, improver of the internal combustion engine
- John Sargent (1780-1833), clergyman, academic and biographer
- Ethel Scarborough (1880-1956), pianist, composer and politician, lived at Quiet Court.
- Jane Vigor (1699-1783), letter writer, born in Graffham
- Samuel Wilberforce (1805-1873), Church of England bishop
- David Young, Baron Young of Graffham (1932-2022), politician

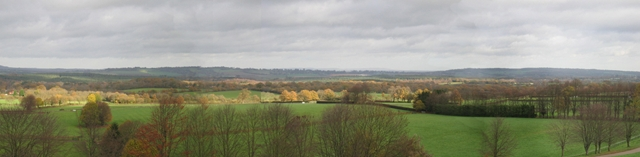

== See also ==
- Cemetery of Saint Giles, Graffham
