= William Battcock =

English cricketer

William Battcock (dates of birth and death unknown) was an English cricketer. The hand with which Battcock batted and his bowling style are also not known. Although where he was born is not known, it is known he was christened on 1 June 1783 at Ford, Sussex.

Battcock made his important debut for G Osbaldeston's XI against Lord F Beauclerk's XI in 1814. His second and final appearance in important cricket came for Sussex in 1817 against Epsom Cricket Club.
