= Goad map =

Goad maps a.k.a. Goad plans or Goad atlases incorporate detailed street maps including individual buildings, their uses and, in some cases, details of construction materials and techniques.

The maps are named for Charles E. Goad who first produced such things for Fire Insurance companies.

Charles Edward Goad was a Civil Engineer who practised in Toronto, London, Ontario, and elsewhere. His major business was the creation of detailed street maps for the inner areas of industrial cities, often as a client of insurance companies. He also produced other larger-area maps e.g. for Ontario.

== Other sources ==
- Rowley, Gwyn, (1984) 'British fire insurance plans'. Charles E. Goad Ltd.
- Rowley, Gwyn and Shepherd, Peter, (1976) 'A source of elementary, spatial data for town centre research in Britain'. Area8 3, 201–208.
- A catalogue of fire insurance plans published by Chas E. Goad 1878–1970. Part A 'British Isles'. Part B 'Foreign'. Goad, 1984.
