= Richard Stanford (Sussex cricketer) =

English cricketer

Personal information
- Full name: Richard Stanford
- Born: Unknown; East Lavant, Sussex, England
- Died: Unknown
- Batting: Unknown
- Bowling: Unknown

Domestic team information
- Years: Team
- 1832: Sussex

Richard Stanford (dates of birth and death unknown) was an English cricketer. Stanford's batting style is unknown. He was christened at East Lavant, Sussex on 27 May 1804.

Stanford made a single appearance for Sussex in 1832 against an England XI at the Royal New Ground, Brighton. In a match which Sussex won by 5 wickets, Stanford batted once, scoring an unbeaten 5 runs in Sussex's first-innings. He also caught Henry Beagley in the England XI's second-innings.
