= Philip Vallance (cricketer, born 1803) =

English cricketer

Personal information
- Full name: Philip Vallance
- Born: 1803; Brighton, Sussex, England
- Died: 3 October 1897; Storrington, Sussex, England
- Batting: Unknown

Domestic team information
- Years: Team
- 1829–1834: Sussex

Career statistics
Competition	First-class
Matches	3
Runs scored	14
Batting average	2.33
100s/50s	–/–
Top score	9
Balls bowled	–
Wickets	–
Bowling average	–
5 wickets in innings	–
10 wickets in match	–
Best bowling	–
Catches/stumpings	1/–
- Source: Cricinfo, 19 December 2011

Philip Vallance (1803 – 3 October 1897) was an English cricketer. Vallance's batting style is unknown. He was born at Brighton, Sussex.

Vallance made his first-class debut for Sussex against Kent in 1829. He made two further first-class appearances for the county, both of which came against England in 1829 and 1834. In his three first-class matches, he scored 14 runs at an average of 2.33, with a high score of 9.

Vallance was also an amateur astronomer who joined the British Astronomical Association at its inception in 1890. His obituary records his cricketing achievements and learning to ride a bicycle at the age of over 80 and becoming keen cyclist.

He died at Storrington, Sussex on 3 October 1897.
