= Richard Bodle =

English cricketer

Personal information
- Born: 23 December 1816; Alfriston, Sussex, England
- Died: 26 January 1869 (aged 52); Southampton, Hampshire, England

Domestic team information
- Years: Team
- 1842–1849: Hampshire
- 1838: Sussex

Career statistics
Competition	First-class
Matches	15
Runs scored	342
Batting average	12.66
100s/50s	0/1
Top score	70
Balls bowled	388
Wickets	15
Bowling average	12.37
5 wickets in innings	1
10 wickets in match	0
Best bowling	5/35
Catches/stumpings	5/–
- Source: Cricinfo, 4 March 2010

Richard Bodle (23 December 1816 – 21 January 1869) was an amateur English cricketer.

Bodle made his first-class cricket debut for Sussex against Kent in 1838. This was Bodles only first-class appearance for Sussex.

Bodle made his debut for Hampshire against the Marylebone Cricket Club in 1842. Bodle played 14 first-class matches for Hampshire from 1842 to 1849, with his final appearance for the county coming against an All England Eleven.

In his 14 matches for Hampshire, he took 15 wickets at a bowling average of 12.37, with one five wicket haul against Petworth in 1845.

Bodle also stood as an Umpire in 2 first-class matches, one in 1842 when Hampshire played an early England side and in 1866 when Hampshire played the Marylebone Cricket Club.

Bodle died at Southampton, Hampshire on 21 January 1869.
