= Selham =

Village in West Sussex, England

Coordinates: 50.97805°N 0.67271°W

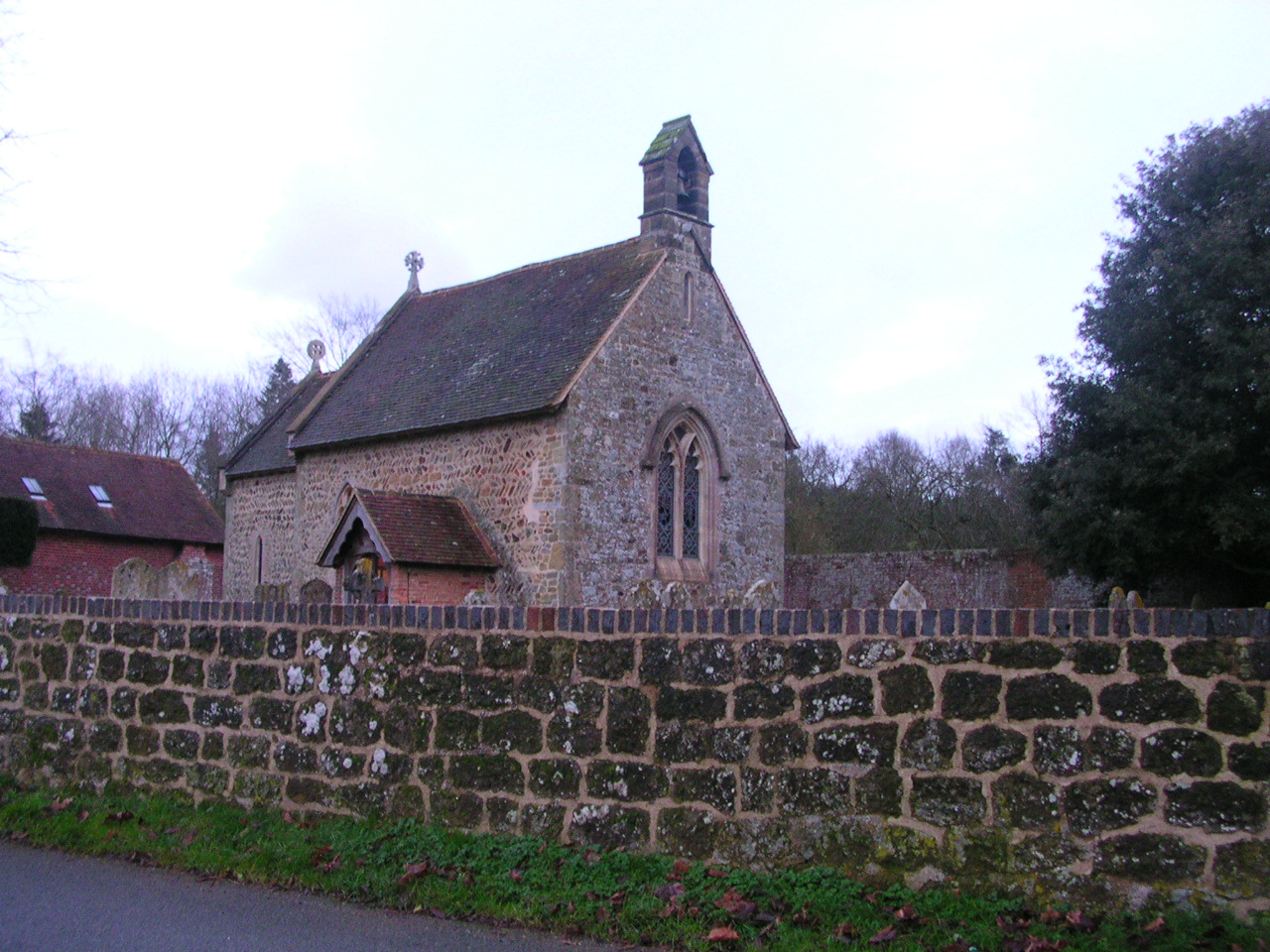
- St. James Church, Selham

- Location within West Sussex
- OS grid reference: SU932206
- Civil parish: Graffham
- District: Chichester
- Shire county: West Sussex
- Region: South East
- Country: England
- Sovereign state: United Kingdom
- Post town: Petworth
- Postcode district: GU28 0
- Police: Sussex
- Fire: West Sussex
- Ambulance: South East Coast
- UK Parliament: Chichester

Selham is a small village and former civil parish, now in the parish of Graffham, in the Chichester district of West Sussex, England. It lies south of the A272 road 3 miles (4.8 km) east of Midhurst. It is mainly in the parish of Graffham, but partly in that of Lodsworth to the north. In 1931 the parish had a population of 65.

== History ==
Selham was listed in the Domesday Book (1086) in the ancient hundred of Easebourne as having six households: two villagers, two smallholders and two slaves; resources included ploughing land, woodland and meadows, and a value to the lord of the manor of just over £3.

In 1861, Selham was still a separate parish covering 1,042 acres (422 ha) with a population of 123. On 1 April 1933 the parish was abolished and merged with Graffham.

In February 2010, James Packer won approval from Chichester District Council for a 327-acre polo complex to be built at Manor Farm on land owned by Lord Cowdray, not far from Great House Farm, the 38-hectare polo complex at Stedham, owned by his father Kerry Packer during the 1980s. Packer withdrew after the 2012 season, with the facilities being taken over by Sheikha Maitha bint Mohammed bin Rashid al-Maktoum.

== Buildings ==
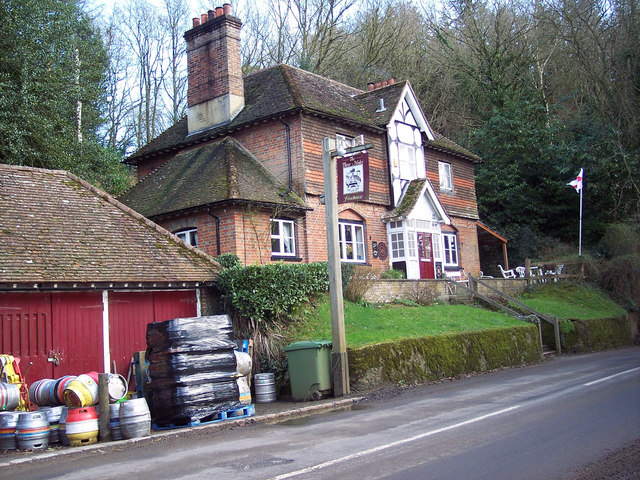
The Three Moles, Selham

Selham's pub is The Three Moles, one of the smallest pubs in Sussex.

The church of St James is largely 11th century, having never undergone any major rebuilding, but it was restored in the 19th century. From 1922–27, Frank Buttle was rector of Selham with South Ambersham.

Nearby the remains of Lodsworth Castle, a large 13th Century motte near Selham at Lodsbridge beside the River Rother. Lodsbridge was a wharf on the Rother Navigation waterway.

There was formerly a railway station on the Pulborough to Petersfield, Hampshire line. Selham Railway Station is now a private house.
