= Henry Warner (English cricketer) =

English cricketer

Personal information
- Full name: Henry Warner
- Batting: Unknown

Domestic team information
- Years: Team
- 1826–1830: Sussex

Career statistics
Competition	First-class
Matches	3
Runs scored	13
Batting average	3.25
100s/50s	–/–
Top score	4*
Balls bowled	–
Wickets	–
Bowling average	–
5 wickets in innings	–
10 wickets in match	–
Best bowling	–
Catches/stumpings	–/–
- Source: Cricinfo, 6 January 2012

Henry Warner (dates of birth and death unknown) was an English cricketer. Warner's batting style is unknown. He was christened at Midhurst, Sussex on 25 March 1799.

Warner made his first-class debut for Sussex against a combined Hampshire and Surrey at Bramshill Park in 1826. He made two further first-class appearances for Sussex, against England in 1829 and Surrey in 1830. In his three first-class matches, he scored a total of 13 runs at an average of 3.25, with a high score of 4 not out.
