= George Goad (cricketer) =

English cricketer

Personal information
- Full name: George Goad
- Born: 4 April 1806; Brighton, Sussex, England
- Died: 1878 (aged 71–72); Brighton, Sussex, England
- Batting: Unknown
- Bowling: Unknown

Domestic team information
- Years: Team
- 1826–1834: Sussex

George Goad (4 April 1806 – 1878) was an English cricketer. Goad's batting and bowling styles are unknown. He was born at Brighton, Sussex.

Goad made his debut for Sussex against Kent in 1826. He made six further appearances for the county, the last of which came against England in 1834. In his six matches, he took 7 wickets, though his bowling average and best figures are unknown due to incomplete records. With the bat, he scored 21 runs at an average of 1.50, with a high score of 6.

He died at the town of his birth in 1878.
