= Henry Tamplin =

English business owner (1801–1867)

Personal information
- Full name: Henry Pagden Tamplin
- Born: 8 February 1801; Brighton, Sussex, England
- Died: 16 December 1867 (aged 66); Pyecombe, Sussex, England
- Batting: Unknown

Domestic team information
- Years: Team
- 1827–1828: Sussex

Career statistics
Competition	First-class
Matches	2
Runs scored	10
Batting average	5.00
100s/50s	–/–
Top score	6
Balls bowled	–
Wickets	–
Bowling average	–
5 wickets in innings	–
10 wickets in match	–
Best bowling	–
Catches/stumpings	–/–
- Source: Cricinfo, 17 December 2011

Henry Pagden Tamplin (1801–1867) was an English business owner, who together with his father founded Tamplin and Son's Brewery, based at the Phoenix Brewery, Brighton, Sussex. He was born at Brighton on 8 February 1801, the son of Richard Tamplin and his wife Elizabeth née Pagden; he died at Pyecombe, Sussex on 16 December 1867.

== Cricket career ==
Tamplin was also a cricketer and made two first-class appearances for Sussex against Kent, one in 1827 and another in 1828. Tamplin's batting style is unknown. In the 1827 match at the Vine Cricket Ground, Tamplin was run out for 3 runs in Sussex's first-innings, while in their second-innings he was wasn't required to bat, with Sussex winning the match by 4 wickets. In the 1828 match at the Royal New Ground, Brighton, he was dismissed for 6 runs in Sussex's first-innings by Timothy Duke, while in their second-innings he ended Sussex's innings unbeaten on 1. The match ended in a draw.

Tamplin's brother-in-law George King, Sr. and nephew George King, Jr. both played first-class cricket.
