= William Hodson (cricketer, born 1841) =

English cricketer

Personal information
- Full name: William Hodson
- Born: 24 January 1841; Cocking, Sussex, England
- Died: 18 May 1896 (aged 55); Preston Park, Sussex, England
- Batting: Unknown
- Bowling: Unknown

Domestic team information
- Years: Team
- 1860–1863: Sussex

Career statistics
Competition	First-class
Matches	15
Runs scored	496
Batting average	21.56
100s/50s	–/1
Top score	50
Balls bowled	36
Wickets	–
Bowling average	–
5 wickets in innings	–
10 wickets in match	–
Best bowling	–
Catches/stumpings	–/–
- Source: Cricinfo, 6 January 2012

William Hodson (24 January 1841 – 15 May 1896) was an English cricketer. Hodson's batting and bowling styles are unknown. He was born at Cocking, Sussex.

Hodson made his first-class debut for Sussex against Kent in 1860. He made thirteen further first-class appearances for the county, the last of which came against the Marylebone Cricket Club in 1863. In his fourteen first-class matches for Sussex, he scored 450 runs at an average of 20.45, with a high score of 50. This score was his only half century and came against Kent in 1863. He also made a single first-class appearance for the Gentlemen of the South against the Players of Surrey in 1863.

He died at Preston Park, Sussex on 15 May 1896.
