= William Pickett (cricketer) =

English cricketer

Personal information
- Full name: William Pickett
- Born: 1805; Streatham, Surrey, England
- Died: 7 December 1849 (aged 43–44); Brighton, Sussex, England
- Batting: Unknown

Domestic team information
- Years: Team
- 1828–1838: Sussex

Career statistics
Competition	First-class
Matches	17
Runs scored	148
Batting average	4.62
100s/50s	–/–
Top score	31
Balls bowled	–
Wickets	–
Bowling average	–
5 wickets in innings	–
10 wickets in match	–
Best bowling	–
Catches/stumpings	3/–
- Source: Cricinfo, 11 February 2012

William Pickett (1805 – 7 December 1849) was an English cricketer. Pickett's batting style is unknown. He was born at Streatham, Surrey.

Pickett made his first-class debut for Sussex against Kent in 1828. He made sixteen further first-class appearances for Sussex, the last of which came against England in 1838. In his total of seventeen first-class matches, Pickett was not noted for his success with the bat, scoring just 132 runs at an average of 4.62, with a high score of 31.

He died at Brighton, Sussex on 7 December 1849.
