= Jemmy Dean =

English cricketer (1816–1881)

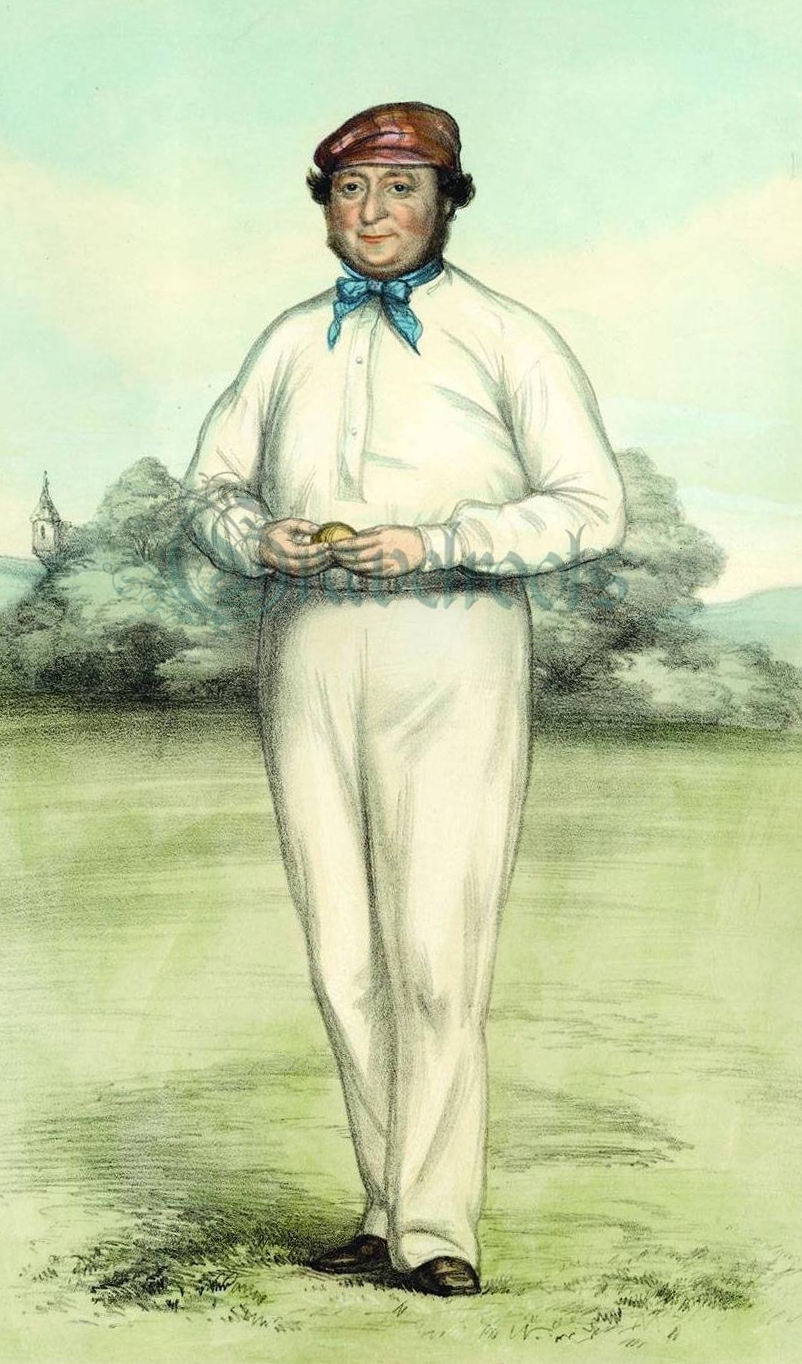

Personal information
- Full name: James Dean
- Born: 4 January 1816; Duncton, Sussex, England
- Died: 25 December 1881 (aged 65); Duncton, Sussex, England
- Batting: Right-handed
- Bowling: Right-arm fast
- Role: Bowler

Domestic team information
- Years: Team
- 1835–1861: Sussex

James Dean (4 January 1816 – 25 December 1881) was an English cricketer with professional status. Mainly associated with Sussex, he is recorded in 305 matches from 1835 to 1861, totalling 5,115 runs at an average of 10.54 with a highest score of 99, holding 206 catches and taking 1,144 wickets with a best analysis of 9/34. Dean achieved 5 wickets in an innings 86 times and 10 wickets in a match 18 times. His nephews David and James, both played.

== Career ==
Dean was a right-handed batsman but was more notable as a bowler. He bowled right arm fast with a roundarm action. A good fielder, he occasionally played as a wicketkeeper. Although primarily a Sussex player, Dean played for numerous other teams but especially for the United All England Eleven (UEE), from 1853 to 1858, of which he was the co-founder with his friend John Wisden. Formerly, from 1848 to 1852, he had represented the All England Eleven (AEE).

In Scores & Biographies, Arthur Haygarth describes Dean as "very stout for a cricketer" because he weighed 12 stone though his height was only 5 foot 7 inches. Dean's pace, says Haygarth, was "always straight and ripping, his balls getting up remarkably quick". He was a sawyer by trade and nicknamed "by some" as "The Ploughboy". Dean was engaged by MCC as a bowler in 1837 and remained in situ till he resigned at the end of the 1861 season. Haygarth, a contemporary, recounts that Dean began the UEE in 1852 "in conjunction with Wisden" and that his likeness, by John Corbett Anderson (see graphic) has been published by Fred Lillywhite.

Harry Altham mentions Dean's "splendid work" for Sussex, Marylebone Cricket Club (MCC) and the AEE before (importantly to Altham) Dean was in 1862 engaged as a coach at Winchester College. Altham then relates that Dean and Wisden founded the UEE in 1852 as a result of "profound dissatisfaction" with William Clarke's management of the AEE. Several leading players such as Jem Grundy and John Lillywhite joined them and Dean and Wisden became the joint secretaries of the UEE. In his Phoenix History, Roy Webber says that interest in the AEE "dropped to reasonable proportions" after the initial sensation and offshoots began to appear, the first being Dean and Wisden's UEE in 1852 with "others to follow".

== Bibliography ==
- Birley, Derek (1999). A Social History of English Cricket. Aurum.
- Major, John (2007). More Than A Game. HarperCollins.
