= George Picknell =

English cricketer

George Picknell (29 November 1813 – 26 February 1863) was an English cricketer active from 1835 to 1854 who played for Sussex. He was born and died in Chalvington, Sussex. He is known to have appeared in 81 first-class matches as a righthanded batsman who bowled right arm fast with a roundarm action. Although records of his time in cricket are incomplete, he accounted for 1,661 runs, with a highest score of 79, and 68 wickets with a best performance of six wickets in one innings. Picknell took part in the 1845 Gentlemen v Players match, as a professional representing the Players.
