= Duncton =

Village and parish in West Sussex, England

Coordinates: 50.9467°N 0.63461°W

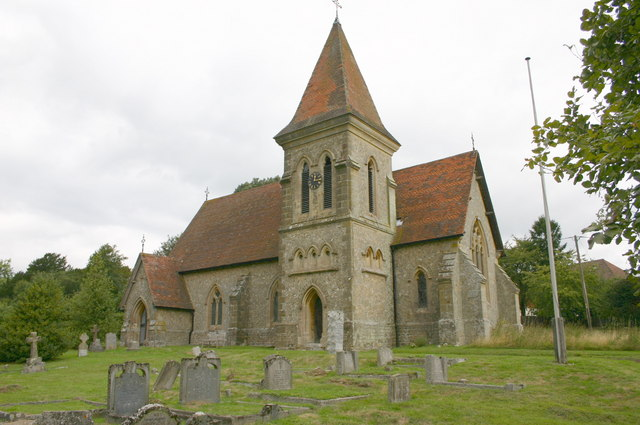
- Holy Trinity parish church

- Location within West Sussex
- Area: 8.00 km^{2} (3.09 sq mi)
- Population: 345 (2011 Census)
  - Density: 44/km^{2} (110/sq mi)
- OS grid reference: SU960172
  - London: 44 miles (71 km) NNE
- Civil parish: Duncton
- District: Chichester
- Shire county: West Sussex
- Region: South East
- Country: England
- Sovereign state: United Kingdom
- Post town: Petworth
- Postcode district: GU28
- Dialling code: 01798
- Police: Sussex
- Fire: West Sussex
- Ambulance: South East Coast
- UK Parliament: Arundel and South Downs
- Website: Duncton

Duncton is a village and civil parish in the District of Chichester in West Sussex, England. The village is in the South Downs 3 miles (5 km) south of Petworth on the A285 road.

The civil parish is about 4 miles (6 km) long north – south and less than 1 mile (1.6 km) wide east – west and has a land area of 800 ha (1,977 acres). The southern part of the parish includes part of Duncton Down, which is 682 feet (208 m) high.

The 2011 Census recorded 345 people living in 182 households, of whom 177 were economically active. The village has a Church of England parish church, a Roman Catholic church. Duncton has a pub, a village hall and two croquet pitches. The parish includes Burton Park, whose stately home and parish church are about 1/2 mile (800 m) east of Duncton village.

Duncton Mill at the foot of the South Downs escarpment was powered by a large spring flowing from the chalk strata. A stable flow of water at a constant temperature throughout the year is ideal for its present use as a trout hatchery.

== Public transport ==
Compass Bus route 99 between Petworth and Chichester serves Duncton six days a week, from Monday to Saturday. There is no service in the evening, or on Sunday or public holidays. On most trips, the bus will call at Duncton only if booked in advance.

== History ==
Prehistoric remains in the parish include a Bronze Age round barrow on Duncton Common in the north of the parish. The remains of a Romano-British villa, including a hypocaust, were found 140 yards northeast of St Mary's parish church and excavated between 1812 and 1816.

The Domesday Book of 1086 records the place-name as Donechitone, and a pipe roll from 1181 records it as Duneketon. The name comes from the Old English words Dunnuca and tūn. Dunnuca was a person's name, and a tūn is a fence or enclosure.

Woollen cloth making was an important local industry in the Middle Ages. Two Duncton clothiers, R Harding and J Goble, left inventories in 1621 and 1622 respectively, with Goble having owned three pairs of finishing shears.

The village has a pub that was built in the 18th century. In 1867 John Wisden (1826 – 1884), the famous Kent, Middlesex, Sussex and England cricketer, who founded Wisden Cricketer's Almanac, bought the pub and leased it to the Sussex cricketer Jemmy Dean (1816 – 1881). The pub is called "The Cricketers" in honour of Dean and another Sussex cricketer, Jem Broadbridge (1795–1843), both of whom lived in Duncton.

Florence de Fonblanque died in Duncton in 1949. She is buried in the churchyard of Holy Trinity parish church. "Originator and leader of the women's suffrage march from Edinburgh to London 1912" is inscribed on her headstone.

== Churches ==
The Church of England parish church of the Holy Trinity is part of the Benefice of Stopham and Fittleworth. Duncton's original parish church, St Mary's, was a medieval building at the foot of Duncton Down, some distance south of the village. In 1864 George Wyndham, 1st Baron Leconfield, of Petworth House, commissioned a new parish church to be built on a more convenient site in the village. It is a Gothic Revival building, designed by James Castle of Oxford and completed in 1866.

A bell from St Mary's, thought to have been cast in Normandy in 1369, was transferred from St Mary's to Holy Trinity. St Mary's was demolished in 1876.

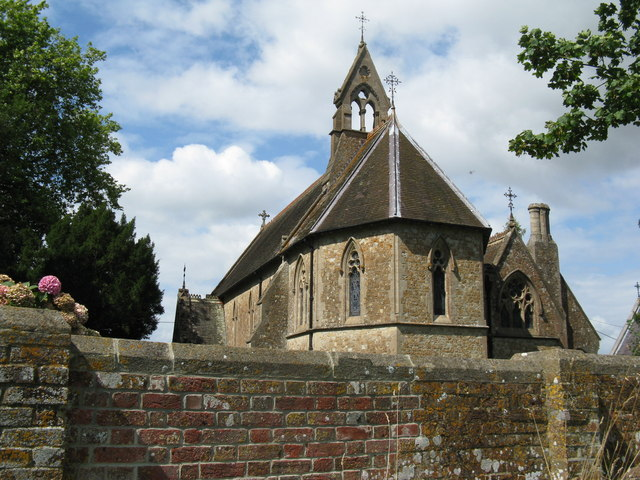
Roman Catholic church of SS Anthony and George

The Roman Catholic church of SS Anthony and George is another Gothic Revival building. It was designed by Gilbert Blount and completed in 1868.

== Bibliography ==
- Crawford, Elizabeth (2004). "Fonblanque, Florence Gertrude de (1864–1949)". Oxford Dictionary of National Biography. London: Oxford University Press.
- Ekwall, Eilert (1960) [1936]. Concise Oxford Dictionary of English Place-Names (4th ed.). Oxford: Oxford University Press. Duncton. ISBN 0198691033.
- Jerrome, Peter (2002). Petworth From the Beginnings to 1660. Petworth: Window Press.
