= Old County Ground =

Cricket ground in Kent

Coordinates: 51.295753°N 0.405293°E

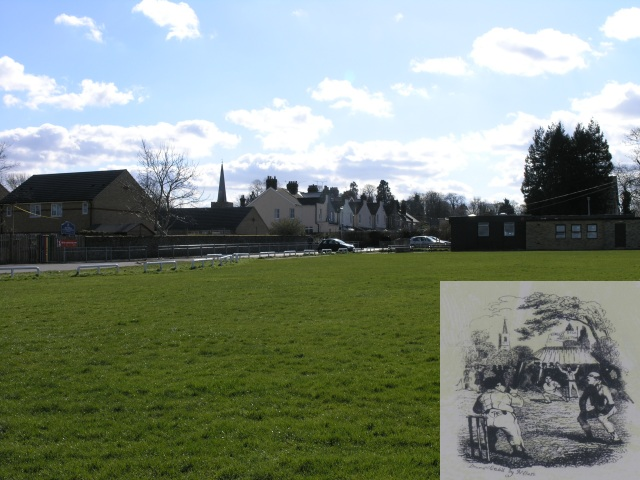
- Interactive map of Old County Ground
- Location: West Malling, Kent
- Home club: Town Malling Cricket Club
- County club: Kent
- Establishment: 1827
- Last used: 1890 (first-class cricket)

The Old County Ground was a first-class cricket ground, located in West Malling, Kent. Known under various names throughout its existence, the ground hosted 14 first-class matches between 1836 and 1890.

== History ==
The ground was first used in 1827, when Town Malling Cricket Club was formed by Thomas Selby and business partner Silas Norton. Originally known as the New Cricket Ground, by 1830 the ground had become known as the "George Field", when a match between Town Malling and Benenden attracted 8000 spectators. The ground acquired the batsman Fuller Pilch as its groundsman in 1835, after a consortium including Selby, Norton and the second Baron Harris had offered him £100 a year to play for the club, manage the ground and the adjoining public house.

First-class cricket was first played on the ground in 1836, when Kent took on Sussex. Pilch himself played for the Kent team, which lost by 32 runs on the second day of the three-day match. First-class matches were played on the ground every year until 1841, including three Kent v England matches. The first of these was a benefit match for Pilch, and saw Kent defeat England by just two runs. However, by 1842 the county club had moved to new headquarters in Canterbury, and first-class cricket would not return to Town Malling until 1878.

When county cricket did return to the Old County Ground, several Kent players were critical of the ground. Francis MacKinnon complained of having to change in an oast house, with access via a stepladder, while William Patterson found "neither the gate nor the accommodation satisfactory". As a result, Kent's match with Sussex in 1890 was the last first-class fixture played on the ground.

== Current ground ==
The ground was purchased by Kent County Council in 1929. It is still in use by Town Malling Cricket Club, who negotiated a 35-year lease with the council in 1987, with the option of purchasing the ground should the council wish to sell it. A new pavilion was opened by Richard Ellison in 1992.

== Notes and references ==
Notes

Bibliography

- Carlaw, Derek (2005). 300 years of cricket at West Malling. Canterbury: Kent County Cricket Club. ISBN 978-09-52792-61-1.
