= List of Sussex County Cricket Club grounds =

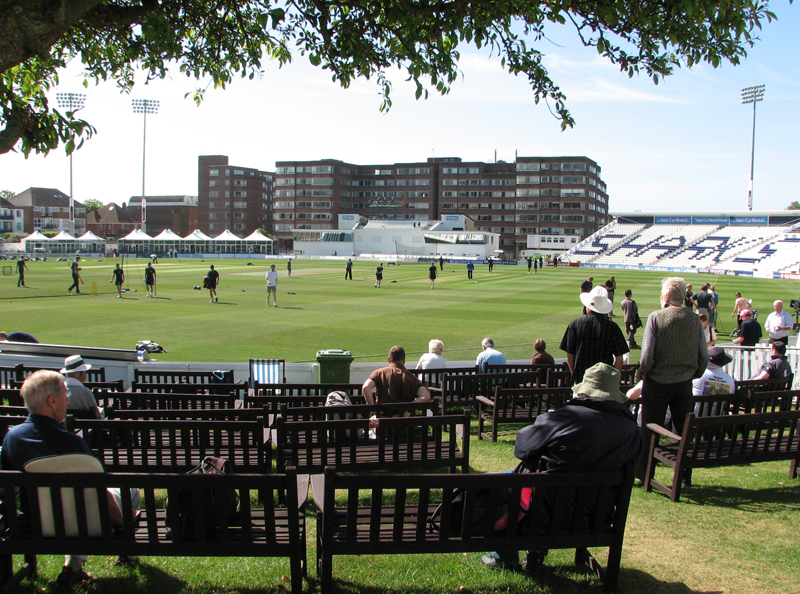
The County Ground, Hove, which was first used in 1872, and has hosted the majority of Sussex's matches.

Sussex County Cricket Club is one of the 18 member clubs of the English County Championship, representing the historic county of Sussex. Although Sussex representative sides had been playing cricket since the mid-eighteenth century and had also played first-class cricket matches since 1815, the County Cricket Club was established on 1 March 1839. They have played first-class matches since 1839, List A matches since 1963, and Twenty20 matches since 2003. (Note: First-class cricket matches are designed to be contested over multiple days, with each team permitted two innings with no limit to the number of overs in an innings. List A matches, also known as limited overs or one-day matches, are intended to be completed in a single day and restrict each team to a single innings of between 40 and 60 overs, depending on the specific competition. Twenty20 matches restrict each team to a single innings of 20 overs.)

Unlike most professional sports, in which a team usually has a single fixed home ground, county cricket clubs have traditionally used different grounds in various towns and cities within the county for home matches, although the use of minor "out grounds" away from the club's main headquarters has diminished since the 1980s. In total, Sussex have played first-class, List A and Twenty20 cricket at 17 different grounds across the county.

The club's first fixture was played at the Royal New Ground, Brighton. The ground was Sussex's main ground until 1848, when the Royal Brunswick Ground in Brunswick, Hove became the main ground. In 1872, the land of the Royal Brunswick Ground was required for the expansion of the town, so the club relocated to the County Ground, which continues to be the main ground for Sussex Cricket Club. The County Ground was the venue where Sussex claimed the 2003 and 2007 County Championships. It is also the only ground in Sussex to have hosted international cricket; in the 1999 World Cup, a One Day International between India and South Africa was played at the ground.

In 1849, the club used a venue outside Brighton for the first time, when they played a first-class match at Petworth Park New Ground; the match against Surrey is notable for being one of Sussex's lowest aggregate scoring matches of all time, with only 287 runs scored. It was also the only time that Petworth Park hosted a Sussex match. Sussex have frequently used out grounds to host some of their matches, typically as part of cricket festivals. In the nineteenth and twentieth centuries, their main out grounds were the Central Recreation Ground in Hastings, The Saffrons in Eastbourne, the Cricket Field Road Ground in Horsham, and the Arundel Castle Cricket Ground (from 1972). After the Central Recreation Ground was demolished in 1996, Sussex also played two List A matches at Horntye Park, Hastings' other cricket ground. (Note: Excludes the match on 26 May 2008 between Sussex and Essex where no plauy was possible.) Eastbourne cancelled its proposed fixture in 2001 and did not host another county match until 2017, whilst Horsham was not awarded any matches for the 2016 season, due to financial difficulties. Due to the COVID-19 pandemic, all of Sussex's matches in 2020 and 2021 were played at the County Ground. In 2020, Hampshire played some "home" fixtures at Arundel, as the Rose Bowl was being used by England.

The County Ground and Arundel Castle are the only two grounds to have hosted Sussex Twenty20 matches.

== Grounds ==
Below is a complete list of grounds used by Sussex County Cricket Club for first-class, List A and Twenty20 matches. Statistics are complete through to the end of the 2020 season. Only matches played by Sussex County Cricket Club since its establishment in 1839 are included in the table. Matches abandoned without any play occurring are not included.

Name	Location	First-class			List A			Twenty20			Refs
Name	Location	First	Last	Matches	First	Last	Matches	First	Last	Matches	Refs
Royal New Ground	Brighton	1 July 1839 v Kent (Note: Excludes matches played by Sussex before it became a County Club.)	27 September 1847 v England	47 (Note: Excludes matches played by Sussex before it became a County Club, 1814 Brighton v Epsom match and 1845 Gentlemen v Players match.)	–	–	0	–	–	0	
Lillywhite's Ground	Brighton	29 August 1842 v England	29 August 1842 v England	1 (Note: Excludes 1839 Gentlemen of Sussex v MCC match.)	–	–	0	–	–	0	
Royal Brunswick Ground	Hove	13 July 1848 v Nottinghamshire	17 July 1871 v Surrey	59 (Note: Excludes 1853 Gentlemen of England v United England Eleven match, two matches played by combined Surrey and Sussex team, one match played by combined Kent and Sussex team, and 1871 Gentlemen v Players match.)	–	–	0	–	–	0	
Petworth Park New Ground	Petworth	19 July 1849 v Surrey	19 July 1849 v Surrey	1 (Note: Excludes three first-class matches played by Petworth Cricket Club.)	–	–	0	–	–	0	
Priory Park	Chichester	7 June 1852 v All England Eleven	28 June 1950 v Glamorgan	16 (Note: Excludes 1882 United Eleven v Australians match, 1886 Lord March's Eleven v Australians match, and 1889 South v North match.)	–	–	0	–	–	0	
E Tredcroft's Ground	Horsham	11 August 1853 v Marylebone Cricket Club	6 August 1855 v Marylebone Cricket Club	3	–	–	0	–	–	0	
The Dripping Pan	Lewes	4 September 1854 v United All England Eleven	9 August 1860 v Marylebone Cricket Club	2	–	–	0	–	–	0	
East Sussex Cricket Ground	St Leonards-on-Sea	10 September 1857 v Marylebone Cricket Club	10 September 1857 v Marylebone Cricket Club	1	–	–	0	–	–	0	
Central Recreation Ground	Hastings	4 September 1865 v Kent	16 August 1989 v Middlesex	143 (Note: Excludes two matches where no play was possible, 39 matches played by the South team, 17 England XI matches, seven Gentlemen v Players matches, two AE Stoddart's XI v The Rest matches, two matches played by a combined Surrey and Sussex team, 1899 Home Counties v The Rest match, 1902 match played by a joint Kent and Sussex team, 1903 The Rest v Lancashire and Yorkshire match, 3 Gentlemen of the South v Players of the South matches, 1912 Gentlemen of the South v South Africans, 1923 Capped v Uncapped match, two Lord Cowdray's XI vs The Rest matches, 1949 Over 30 v Under 30 match, 1951 Over 32 v Under 32 match, 1957 LEG Ames' XI v West Indians, and 8 matches hosted by AER Gilligan's XI.)	8 July 1973 v Yorkshire	20 August 1989 v Middlesex	14 (Note: Excludes two matches where no play was possible.)	–	–	0	
Ashford Road	Eastbourne	22 August 1867 v Kent	25 August 1873 v Kent	2	–	–	0	–	–	0	
County Ground	Hove	6 June 1872 v Gloucestershire	– still in use	1,222 (Note: Excludes seven matches where no play was possible, 1881 Gentlemen v Players match, 1884 Cambridge University Past and Present v Australians match, 1886 South v Australians match, and 1973 Marylebone Cricket Club Touring Team v The Rest match.)	12 June 1963 v Yorkshire	– still in use	399 (Note: Excludes sixteen matches where no play was possible and 1999 Cricket World Cup match between South Africa and India.)	18 June 2003 v Middlesex	– still in use	96 (Note: Excludes three matches where no play was possible.)	
The Saffrons	Eastbourne	1 July 1897 v Middlesex	16 August 2000 v Northamptonshire	159 (Note: Excludes two matches where no play was possible, two matches hosted by the South team, three England XI v Australians matches, 41 matches hosted by HDG Leveson-Gower's XI, five matches hosted by the Gentlemen of England, 1922 RAF v The Rest match, two matches hosted by Harlequins, four matches hosted by DR Jardine's XI, two matches hosted by LC Stevens' XI, and eight matches hosted by DH Robin's XI.)	19 July 1970 v Essex	24 July 2020 v Kent	35	–	–	0	
Cricket Field Road Ground	Horsham	15 June 1908 v Essex	19 July 2015 v Nottinghamshire	104 (Note: Excludes one match where no play was possible.)	16 May 1971 v Leicestershire	9 August 2020 v Gloucestershire	34 (Note: Excludes five matches where no play was possible and 2001 Sussex Cricket Board v Gloucestershire match.)	–	–	0	
Manor Sports Ground	Worthing	26 June 1935 v Oxford University	10 June 1964 v Nottinghamshire	43	–	–	0	–	–	0	
Arundel Castle Cricket Ground	Arundel	25 July 1990 v Hampshire	– still in use	34 (Note: Excludes 2000 West Indians v Zimbabweans match, three matches hosted by the MCC, 2002 Indians v West Indies match, 2003 India A v South Africans match and two Hampshire matches in 2020.)	20 July 1972 v Gloucestershire	– still in use	20 (Note: Excludes two matches where no play was possible. Includes Unicorns v Sussex 2010 Clydesdale Bank 40 match, where Unicorns were home team, and Sussex were away team.)	27 June 2006 v Hampshire	– still in use	7	
Pagham Cricket Club Ground	Pagham	23 June 1976 v Oxford University	27 June 1979 v Oxford University	2	–	–	0	–	–	0	
Horntye Park	Hastings	–	–	0	7 May 2000 v Zimbabweans	6 May 2001 v Kent	2 (Note: Excludes one match where no play was possible and two matches hosted by Sussex Cricket Board.)	–	–	0	
