= 1791 English cricket season =

Cricket season review

The emergence of the Brighton club in the 1791 English cricket season heralded a brief revival of Sussex cricket, which had been prominent during the early 18th century. As with Hornchurch Cricket Club and Essex, the Brighton team was a fair representation of Sussex as a county, and the county name is used where the opposition is another county team or England. The club's venue was the Prince of Wales Ground in Brighton, which had its name changed over the years and was known as Box's Ground in the 19th century. Details of 26 historically important eleven-a-side matches are known. (Note: Any match listed in the ACS' Important Match Guide (1981) is historically important, and therefore of the highest standard, whether or not a scorecard might exist. The same applies to numerous matches discovered by researchers since 1981. For further information, see First-class cricket.)

== Brighton Cricket Club ==
Brighton played Middlesex on the Prince of Wales Ground from 19 to 22 September. Middlesex won by 21 runs. Although Brighton lost to Middlesex, the club's emergence at this time heralded a brief revival of Sussex cricket which had been prominent during the early 18th century. As with Hornchurch/Essex and others, the Brighton team was a fair representation of Sussex as a county, and the county name is sometimes used in the club's matches.

== Nottingham v MCC ==
Marylebone Cricket Club (MCC) ventured north to play Nottingham on King's Meadow. The match took place on 29 and 30 August. MCC won by 10 wickets. The MCC team was good quality, and it is clear that the Nottingham team was representative of its county. The match is historically important, and is also recorded in William North's 1832 book of Nottingham Old Club Match Scores.

MCC played in several more matches this season, including four against Essex, and two each against Kent and Middlesex.

== Hampshire ==
Hampshire lost all five of the important matches they played, four against England and one against Surrey.

== Other events ==
Lord's was the scene of an Old Etonians v Gentlemen match from 30 May to 2 June. This sort of event recurred frequently at Lord's as it established itself within the social scene. The teams were composed mainly of leading amateurs, but they would tend to include professionals as given men. The Gentlemen won this match by 6 wickets.

== Bibliography ==
- ACS (1981). A Guide to Important Cricket Matches Played in the British Isles 1709–1863. Nottingham: ACS. OCLC 85045528.
- Haygarth, Arthur (1996) [1862]. Scores & Biographies, Volume 1 (1744–1826). Kennington: Frederick Lillywhite. ISBN 978-19-00592-23-9.
