= The Level, Brighton =

Public park in Brighton, England

The Level
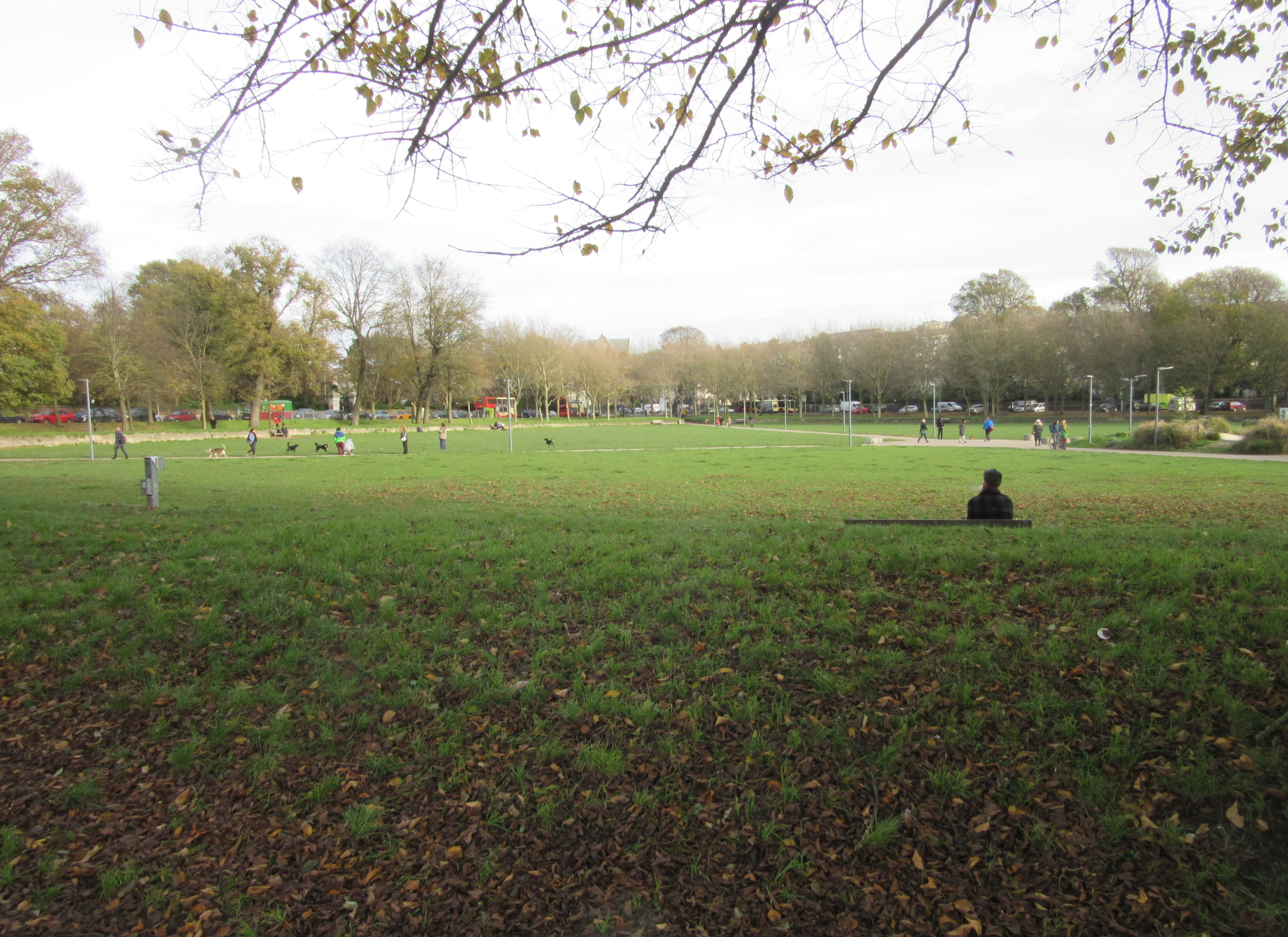
- The northern half of the Level
- Interactive map of The Level
- Type: Public Park
- Location: Brighton, England
- Coordinates: 50°49′50″N 00°08′00″W
- Area: 8.05 acres (3.26 ha)
- Created: 1822
- Operator: Brighton & Hove City Council
- Open: 24 hours
- Status: Open year round
- Awards: Civic Trust Award, Green Flag Award, National Landscape award, National Lottery Heritage Fund, Sussex Heritage Trust
- Public transit: National Cycle Route 20, Buses: 21, 22, 24, 25, 26, 37, 37B, 46, 48, 49, 50, 78 and 79.

The Level is an urban park in central Brighton, on the south coast of England. The park is a triangle of 8.05 acres (3.26 ha) bounded by Union Road to the north, Richmond Terrace (A270) to the east, and Ditchling Road (A23) to the west. In the past, the land has been used as a cricket ground for the Prince of Wales and as a setting for large-scale dinner parties to commemorate events such as the defeat of Napoleon Bonaparte and the coronation of Queen Victoria.

The Level is often used for public meetings and gatherings. These have included May Day events, a 1983 peace camp and the Brighton Urban Free Festival. Present day features of the park include a grassed area with elm trees and outdoor seating, a skatepark, public toilets, a rose garden, a children's playground and a water feature. The park was substantially redeveloped from 2009 onwards.

== Overview ==
The Level is in central Brighton, about 1 mile (1.6 km) north of the seafront. It now covers 8.05 acres (3.26 ha) but was originally much bigger, encompassing the present-day Victoria Gardens and Valley Gardens to the south and the land now occupied by Park Crescent to the north. It forms a rough triangle enclosed by Union Street to the north, Ditchling Road (A23) to the west and Richmond Terrace (originally the southernmost part of Lewes Road) and Richmond Place (A270) to the east.

The park is surrounded by elm trees and is laid out in three sections. The northern part of the urban park is a grassed area. In the middle section is a skatepark. The southern part of the park is a children's playground and also includes a café, public toilets, a pavilion which can be hired for community use, a water feature, a sensory garden and a zone for boccia and pétanque.

Brighton and Hove City Council added the Level to their Local List of Heritage Assets in 2015. The council's assessment described it as a "well-designed municipal public playground, within an early public park ... [which] contributes greatly to the character of the area". The park lies on National Cycle Route 20 and is served by buses 21, 22, 24, 25, 26, 28, 29 37, 37B, 46, 48, and 49.

== Early history ==
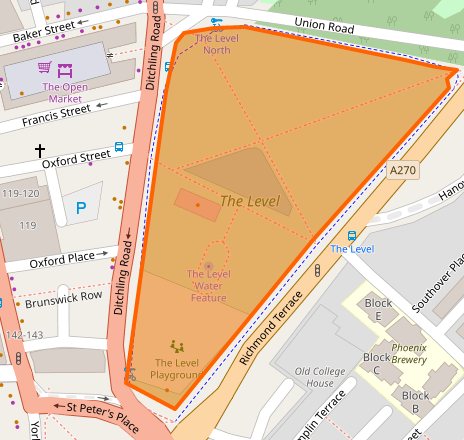
This map shows the bounds of the Level and nearby features

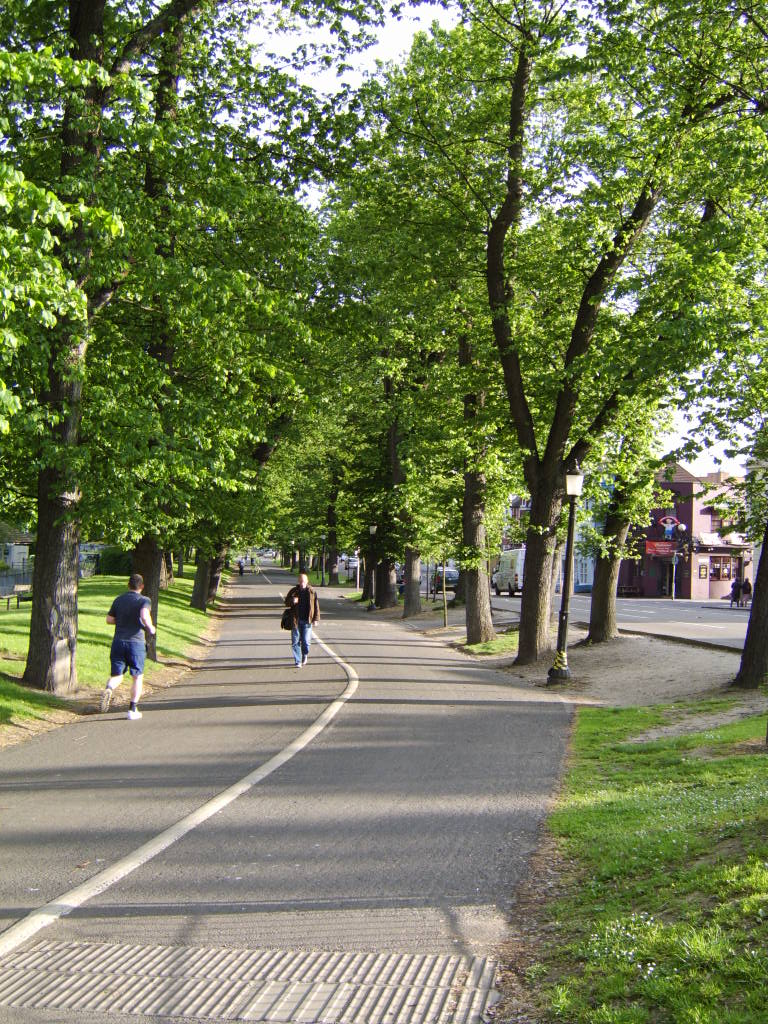
West side of the Level with elm trees, 2006

London Road and Lewes Road, two major routes leading out of Brighton, were built along steep-sided valleys through which winterbournes flowed intermittently. The valleys, and therefore the streams, met where the Level is now and flowed out to sea at the Old Steine. The land was always marshy and swampy and was never built upon. Instead, it became a popular place for public recreation and entertainment as Brighton grew into a fashionable seaside resort in the 18th century. After the town's authorities banned ball games and other traditional entertainments on the Old Steine in 1787, the Level became the focus for the early resort's sporting activities: The Prince of Wales (later George IV of the United Kingdom) then laid out a cricket ground on the northern side in 1791. The Prince of Wales Ground hosted early first-class matches and served as the home of Brighton Cricket Club, later one of the principal founders of Sussex County Cricket Club. In 1822, the cricket ground moved to a nearby site called the Hanover Ground; after another move to the Royal Brunswick Ground on the Brunswick estate, it was established on its present site on Eaton Road in Hove in 1872. The Bat and Ball pub on Ditchling Road, facing the west side of the Level, commemorates the ground. Other popular events included the town's annual bonfire celebrations on Guy Fawkes Night, regular circuses and fairs, and traditional activities such as bat and trap and skipping. Writing in 1883, a contributor to the Sussex Archaeological Collections journal noted that the local Good Friday tradition of skipping was still maintained at the Level, where "scores of skippers" could be seen.

As well as these informal recreational events, the Level (especially the southern part, closest to the town centre) was used for formal, town-wide events and commemorations, such as the Prince's birthday celebrations. The Allied Powers' defeat of Napoleon Bonaparte was celebrated in Brighton by the Great Peace Festival of August 1814. A mass dinner of roast beef and plum puddings was served at 75 double rows of tables for more than 7,000 people, and the town's authorities organised activities such as running races, stoolball, dancing and kiss-in-the-ring. The coronations of King George IV and Victoria, and the ends of both the Napoleonic Wars and the Crimean War were celebrated with similar large-scale public feasts.

On 22 April 1822, the 8.05 acres of land that today form the Level was given in trust to Brighton by Thomas Read Kemp and other landowners. Thereafter, apart from 105 acres (42 ha) of downland near Brighton Racecourse, far out of town on top of Race Hill, The Level was the only area of common land available to the town's residents. In the same year Union Road was built to connect the Ditchling and Lewes Roads, marking the northern edge of the Level, and the land to the north of it was sold. Local entrepreneur James Ireland established the Royal Gardens on this section, but the venture failed and the land was later sold again; Park Crescent was built on it from 1849. Also in 1822, the Level itself was designed and laid out by architect Amon Henry Wilds and horticulturist Henry Phillips. The elm trees, a gift to the town from Henry Pelham, 3rd Earl of Chichester, were planted in November 1844. Many were uprooted in the Great Storm of 1987, although at the time Brighton Borough Council was considering felling many of them because of an outbreak of Dutch elm disease.

By the time Victoria became Queen in 1837, the Level was an important part of the growing resort of Brighton: the town extended for 1 mile (1.6 km) northwards from the seafront, encompassing a "splendid boulevard" formed by the green spaces of the Old Steine, Valley Gardens (with St Peter's Church as the centrepiece) and the Level itself. Also at this time, when the success of Britain's first inter-city railway encouraged investment and speculation in the new form of transport, six routes were suggested for a railway line between London and Brighton. The shortest and most direct, covering 47.5 miles (76.4 km) but requiring the most expensive construction work, would have terminated just north of the Level on the site of James Ireland's pleasure gardens. After a line was built slightly further west in 1841, Brighton's population grew rapidly and its character changed. One feature of the mid- to late 19th century was a rapid growth in prostitution; it was common at the Level, when at night "the scenes ... were said to beggar all description". A police station was established in a small building at the southern end of the park in 1865. In 1919 it became the headquarters of the Brighton Parks and Gardens Department, and was later converted into a café.

Political gatherings were also a feature of the Level. Among the regular events held there was the annual May Day rally and demonstration by the Brighton Trades Council, which was formed in 1890. These events "became well known nationally"; members included Margaret Bondfield, who was employed as a draper's assistant in Brighton at the time and who later became the first female cabinet minister in the United Kingdom. Later, local resident Harry Cowley was an organiser of the barrow boys—many of whom had been in the armed forces during World War I—on nearby Oxford Street. In the early 1920s he negotiated permission for them to sell fruit and vegetables alongside the rose garden on the Level. This went on until the Open Market was built on the opposite side of Ditchling Road in 1926, when the boys moved there instead. In the 1930s, Cowley and his associates broke up a meeting of the Fascist League at the Level. There was again a clash with fascists in June 1948, when members of the 43 Group and Brighton locals prevented a meeting of Oswald Mosley's Union Movement. What became known as the Battle of the Level ensured no fascists returned to Brighton until the 1960s.

The children's playground was first constructed in 1927 by Bertie Hubbard MacLaren (Superintendent of Parks and Gardens). He added a boating pond and a pergola. The pond has since been made smaller. During World War II, the Royal Engineers requisitioned the Chichester Diocesan Training College for Schoolmistresses at Ditchling Road; they put up several Nissen huts on the Level to give them more space, and these temporary buildings stayed until well into the 1950s.

== Recent history ==
=== Peace camp ===
Brighton Women's Peace Camp was set up on the Level on 15 February 1983, in support of the Greenham Common Women's Peace Camp. At RAF Greenham Common, women were protesting against cruise missiles from the US being placed on British soil. The Brighton camp was one of many short-lived satellite camps that appeared around the United Kingdom in early 1983. In contrast to the heavy-handed treatment of campers at Greenham by the authorities, Brighton participants said "The Brighton Corporation have been very good. And the police have been very good."

=== BUFF ===
The Brighton Urban Free Festival (BUFF) was held on the Level for the first time on 1 September 1984. It was a free music festival which aimed to promote local bands. It occurred again in 1985, then moved to Preston Park in 1986, before returning to The Level in 1987, 1988, 1991 and 1992. Bands which played included Peter and the Test Tube Babies, These Animal Men and the Levellers.

== Skatepark ==
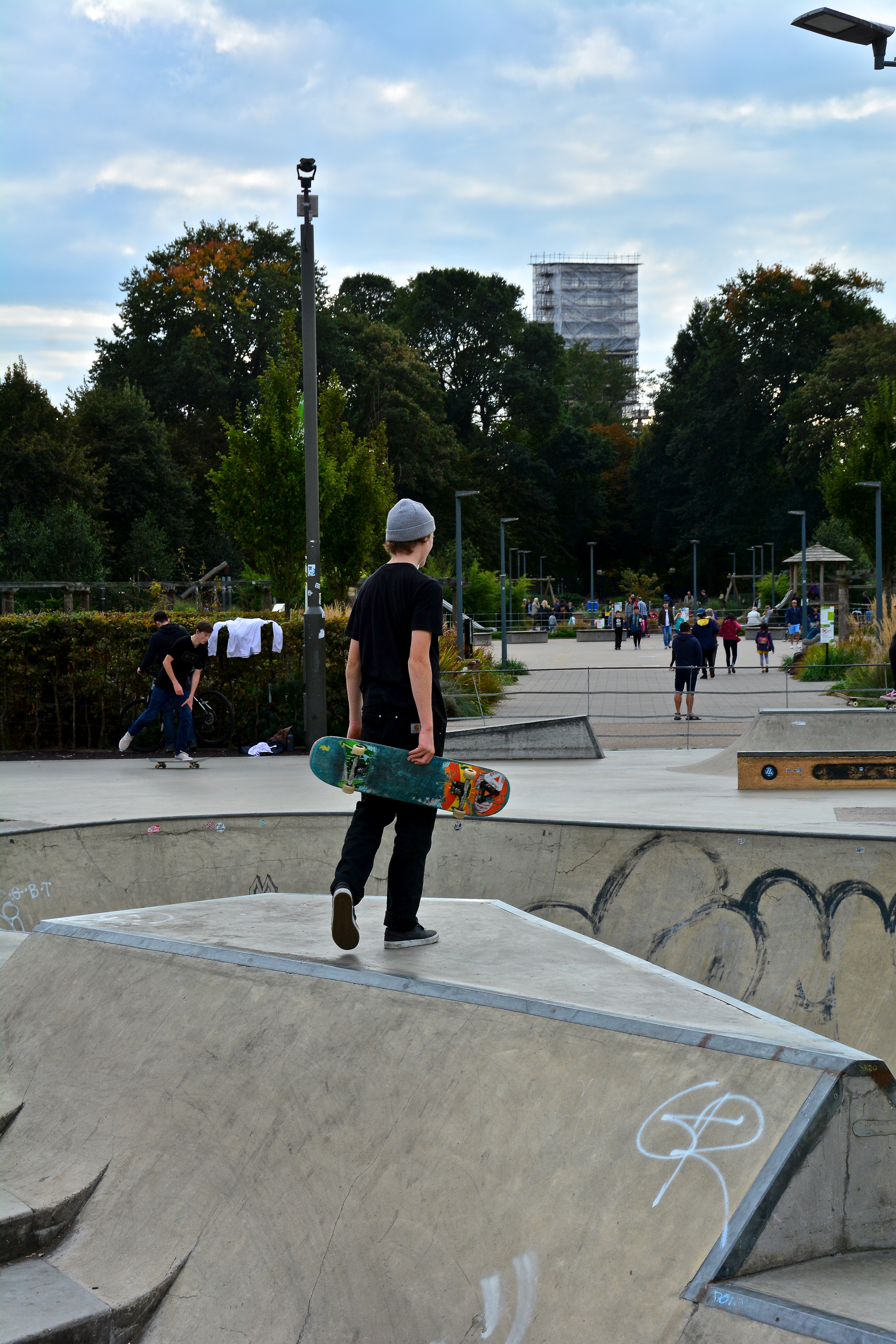
The redeveloped skate park

The first skatepark was designed by architects Murrin and Partners and built on the Level in 1978. There was a nearby skateshop called Pig City and in the 1990s there were regular skate competitions. In the early 2000s, an elm tree next to the skatepark became famous for having many shoes thrown into its branches. It then had to be felled in 2018 after catching Dutch elm disease from elms on the other side of the cycle path.

The council received a lottery grant of £2.2 million to build a new park, which was designed by Freestyle. The new park opened in June 2013.

== Redevelopment ==
Following a successful National Lottery Heritage Fund grant request, the Level was substantially redeveloped from 2009 onwards, expanding MacLaren's original design: the skatepark was moved and rebuilt, taking up what had previously been a grassed area; the pavilions were regenerated; the model boating pond was restored with a fountain; the playground was reconfigured; a sensory garden was added; an area for boccia and pétanque was provided.

The park won a Sussex Heritage Trust award in 2016 and is now Green Flag Award accredited. It also won a Civic Trust Award and National Landscape award.

== Bibliography ==
- Antram, Nicholas; Morrice, Richard (2008). Brighton and Hove. Pevsner Architectural Guides. London: Yale University Press. ISBN 978-0-300-12661-7.
- Clunn, Harold P. (1953). The Capital-by-the-Sea. Brighton: The Southern Publishing Co Ltd.
- Collis, Rose (2010). The New Encyclopaedia of Brighton. (based on the original by Tim Carder) (1st ed.). Brighton: Brighton & Hove Libraries. ISBN 978-0-9564664-0-2.
- Erredge, John Ackerson (1862). History of Brighthelmston, or Brighton as I view it and others knew it.
- Dale, Antony (1976). Brighton Town and Brighton People. Chichester: Phillimore & Co. Ltd. ISBN 0-85033-219-2.
- Fines, Ken (2002). A History of Brighton & Hove. Chichester: Phillimore & Co. ISBN 1-86077-231-5.
- Gilbert, Edmund M. (1975) [1954]. Brighton: Old Ocean's Bauble. Hassocks: Flare Books. ISBN 0-901759-39-2.
- Seldon, Anthony (2002). Brave New City: Brighton & Hove Past, Present, Future. Lewes: Pomegranate Press. ISBN 0-9542587-1-1.
- Trimingham, Adam (1999). Trimingham's Brighton. Westmeston: Pomegranate Press. ISBN 0-9533493-2-2.
- Underwood, Eric (1978). Brighton. London: B.T. Batsford Ltd. ISBN 0-7134-0895-2.
