= William Humphry =

English cricketer

Personal information
- Full name: William James Humphry
- Born: 5 November 1814; Lavant, Sussex, England
- Died: 30 July 1865 (aged 50); Donnington, Sussex, England
- Batting: Unknown
- Bowling: Unknown
- Relatives: George Humphry (brother)

Domestic team information
- Years: Team
- 1848–1854: Sussex

William James Humphry (5 November 1814 – 30 September 1865) was an English cricketer. Humphry's batting and bowling styles are unknown. He was born at Lavant, Sussex.

Humphry made his debut for Petworth against Hampshire at Petworth Park New Ground in 1845. He played two further matches for Petworth in 1845, against the Marylebone Cricket Club at Petworth Park New Ground, and a return fixture against Hampshire at Day's Ground, Southampton. In that same season he also made a single appearance for the Gentleman against the Players at the Royal New Ground, Brighton. His next appearance came in 1848, when he made his debut for Sussex against the Marylebone Cricket Club at Lord's. He made seven further appearances for the county, the last of which came against a United All-England Eleven at the Dripping Pan, Lewes, in 1854. He also made a single appearance each for the Gentlemen of England against a United England Eleven in 1853, and for the Surrey Club against the Marylebone Cricket Club in 1855. In total, he made fourteen appearances, scoring a total of 175 runs at an average of 8.33, with a high score of 30. With the ball, he took three wickets, all of which came for Petworth in their second match against Hampshire in 1845. Humphry took figures of 3/2 from two overs.

He died at Donnington, Sussex, on 30 September 1865. His brother, George, also played.
