= Henry Osborn (cricketer) =

English cricketer

Personal information
- Full name: Henry Osborn
- Born: 7 August 1823; Pulborough, Sussex, England
- Batting: Unknown
- Bowling: Unknown

Domestic team information
- Years: Team
- 1848–1860: Sussex

Career statistics
Competition	First-class
Matches	6
Runs scored	45
Batting average	5.00
100s/50s	–/–
Top score	11
Balls bowled	200
Wickets	6
Bowling average	8.50
5 wickets in innings	–
10 wickets in match	–
Best bowling	3/9
Catches/stumpings	1/–
- Source: Cricinfo, 26 August 2012

Henry Osborn (7 August 1823 – date of death unknown) was an English cricketer. Osborn's batting and bowling styles are unknown. He was born at Pulborough, Sussex.

Osborn made his first-class debut for Petworth against Hampshire in 1845 at Petworth Park New Ground. He made a second first-class appearance for Petworth in the same season in the return fixture at Days Ground, Southampton. In his two first-class appearances for the team, he scored 28 runs at an average of 9.33, with a high score of 11. With the ball, he took 5 wickets at an average of 6.60, with best figures of 3/9. He made his first-class debut for Sussex against Kent in 1848 at the Royal Brunswick Ground, Hove. He made three further first-class appearances for Sussex, twice against Surrey in 1849 at The Oval and Petworth Park New Ground, and eleven years later against Kent at the Royal Brunswick Ground. In his four first-class appearances for the county, he scored 17 runs at an average of 2.83, with a high score of 7. With the ball, he took a single wicket for the county.
