= Park Crescent, Brighton =

Terrace of houses in Brighton, East Sussex, UK

Park Crescent
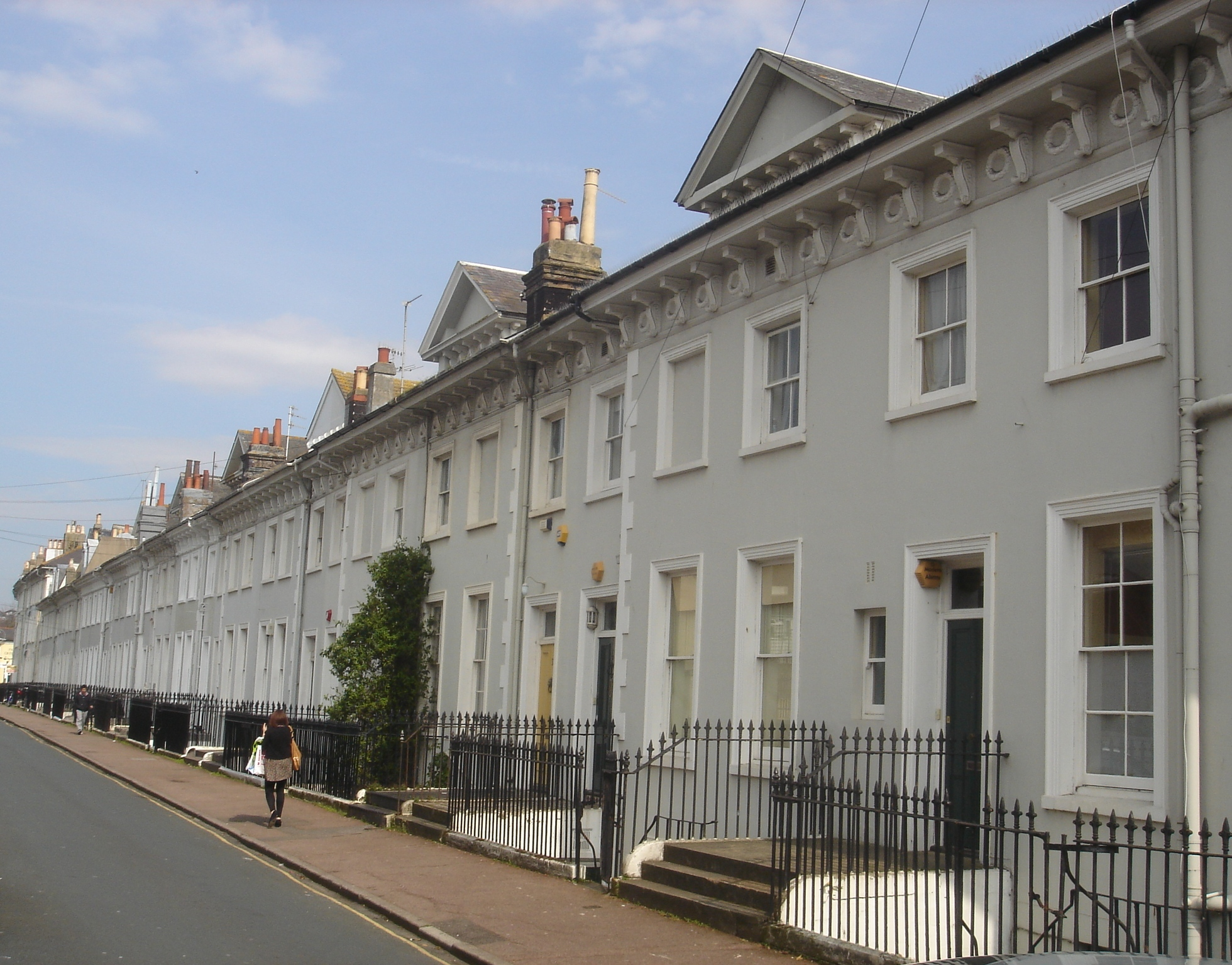
- The rear elevation of 1–16 Park Crescent

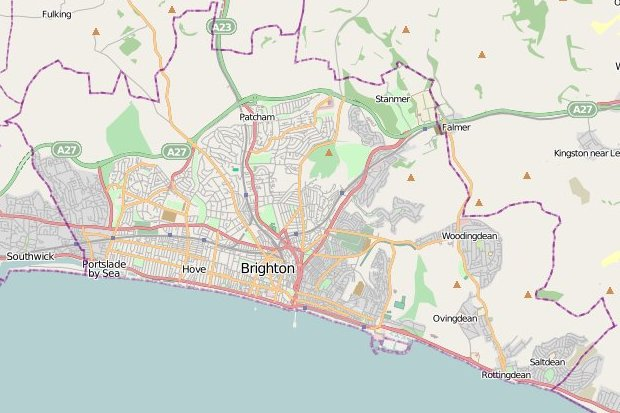
- Location within Brighton and Hove
- 50.8324°N 0.1314°W
- Location: Park Crescent, Round Hill, Brighton and Hove, East Sussex, United Kingdom

History
- Built: 1849–1854 (Note: Some older sources incorrectly give 1829 as the start date.)
- Rebuilt: 1983 (Numbers 24–26)

Site notes
- Architect: Amon Henry Wilds
- Architectural style: Italianate

Listed Building – Grade II*
- Official name: Nos. 1–16 Park Crescent (Consecutive); Nos. 17–24 and 26–32 Park Crescent (Consecutive); Nos. 33–48 Park Crescent (Consecutive)
- Designated: 24 July 1969
- Reference no.: 1380694; 1380697; 1380698

Park Crescent is a mid-19th-century residential development in the Round Hill area of Brighton, part of the English city of Brighton and Hove. The horseshoe-shaped, three-part terrace of 48 houses was designed and built by one of Brighton's most important architects, Amon Henry Wilds; by the time work started in 1849 he had 35 years' experience in the town. Wilds used the Italianate style rather than his (and Brighton's) more common Regency motifs. Three houses were replaced after the Second World War because of bomb damage, and another was the scene of one of Brighton's notorious "trunk murders" of the 1930s. The three parts of the terrace, which encircle a private garden formerly a pleasure ground and cricket pitch, have been listed at Grade II* by English Heritage for their architectural and historical importance.

== History ==
The fishing village of Brighthelmston, on the English Channel coast, was built around the point at which the Wellesbourne, a winterbourne flowing off the South Downs, entered the sea. It formed a north–south valley along which the road and railway line to London were built. The road to London diverged from the road to Lewes, which also followed a valley northeastwards, at an area of marshy, intermittently flooded ground called The Level. By the 18th century, when the village started developing into the fashionable resort of Brighton, this had become a popular site for fairs, sports and general recreation. In 1791, the northernmost part became the Prince of Wales Ground, a cricket ground which hosted early first-class matches and served as the home of Brighton Cricket Club, one of the principal founders of Sussex County Cricket Club 50 years later.

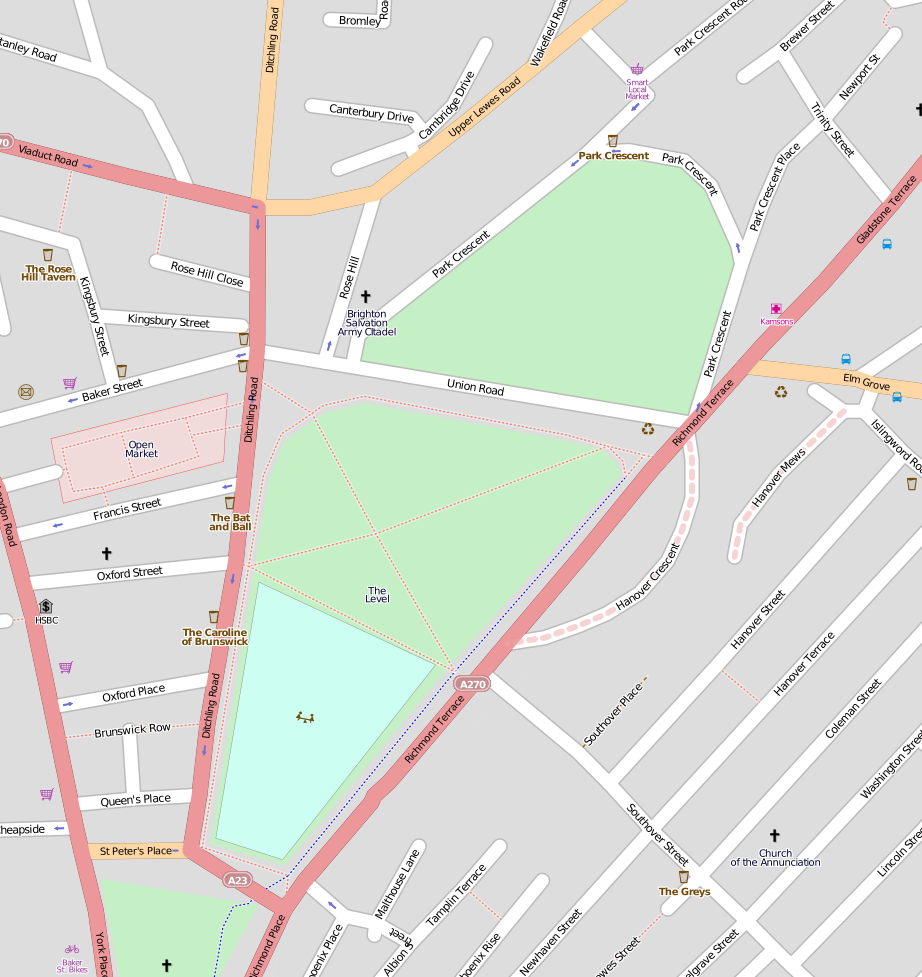
Map showing Park Crescent and surrounding area

Major changes happened in 1822 after the Prince Regent—the most enthusiastic player and supporter of cricket among Brighton's high society—became king and retired from the sport. The Prince of Wales Ground fell into disuse at this time. Meanwhile, The Level was granted to the town by its landowners, who included influential local clergyman, politician, property speculator and Lord of the manor Thomas Read Kemp. Union Road was built from east to west connecting the London and Lewes Roads, and the 8-acre (3.2 ha) area to its south was landscaped by Amon Henry Wilds and landscape gardener Henry Phillips. The 10-acre (4.0 ha) part to the north was bought by a speculator, James Ireland, who built the Royal Gardens—a multi-purpose pleasure garden with a new cricket ground (the Royal New Ground). The gardens opened on 1 May 1823.

Cricket remained the most popular attraction throughout the gardens' existence, but there was a range of activities: bowling greens, a "noble and conspicuous building" with ground-floor billiard rooms, refreshment facilities and reading rooms and a walking area on the roof, lawns, a grotto, an aviary, fairground activities, and an artificial lake with a path leading to a maze whose centrepiece was a special swinging chair. A bizarre flying demonstration took place on one occasion, during which a businessman and associate of Ireland claimed he would fly from the roof of the main building to the far side of the gardens. When he merely sailed down a rope wearing a pair of wings and attached to a pulley, the spectators were so unimpressed that he had to escape into the maze to get away from them. The gardens soon began to decline in popularity, and Ireland sold them in 1826. Under later owners' oversight, they became overgrown, and the main building soon became unusable. Only the ornamental gate piers and the south boundary wall (on the north side of Union Road) remain.

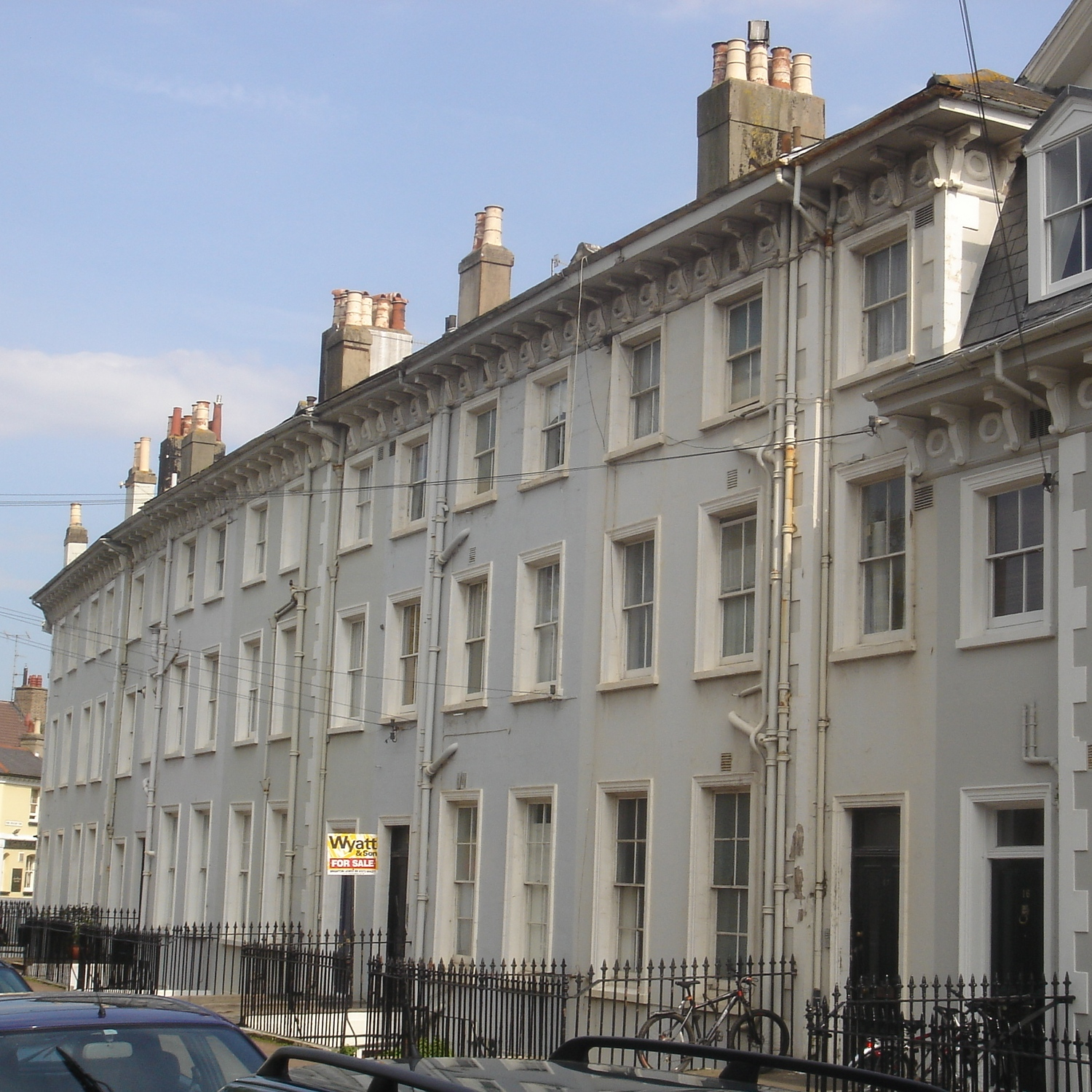
Rear elevation of the north side of Park Crescent

The gardens and the land surrounding then came up for sale again in the late 1840s. After the opening of the railway line and Brighton railway station nearby in 1841, the surrounding area developed as a largely working-class area of small terraced houses. In about 1849 Amon Henry Wilds attempted to introduce some higher-class housing with his Park Crescent development. It was envisaged as a long, horseshoe-shaped crescent facing inwards towards the former cricket ground part of the Royal Gardens, which would be a private garden for residents. Work started on the 48-house development, described as Wilds's "most ambitious scheme", in 1849.

The crescent was complete in 1854, one of Wilds's final works before his death in 1857. At first the gardens were managed by a private agent on behalf of the residents, but a committee of residents took over responsibility in 1872. The 19th-century German philosopher Arnold Ruge lived at number 7 and was chairman of the Park Crescent Residents' Association. Lewis Carroll's sister Henrietta moved to number 4 Park Crescent in 1885 and lived a hermit-like existence with several cats for company. She died in 1922. In 1934, number 44 was the site of the second notorious "Brighton trunk murder" in the space of a few weeks. On 15 July that year, the body of Violet Kaye, a prostitute, was found in a suitcase in a house in Kemp Street in the North Laine area. Her pimp, Tony Mancini, alleged that he found her dead in bed in the Park Crescent house and transported her to lodgings in Kemp Street out of fear. Remarkable work by defence counsel Norman Birkett kc acquitted Mancini, but he confessed to the murder in 1976.

Wartime damage to Brighton's grand squares, terraces and crescents was minimal, and much less than expected; nevertheless, three houses (numbers 24, 25 and 26) in the centre of the northern part of the crescent were destroyed by a bomb in 1942. They were not replaced until 1983, when the three houses were rebuilt as two, omitting number 25. The replacements were built in the same style as the rest of the terrace.

The west, north and east sides of the crescent were each listed separately at Grade II* on 13 October 1952. Such buildings are defined as being "particularly important ... [and] of more than special interest". As of February 2001, they were three of the 70 Grade II*-listed buildings and structures, and 1,218 listed buildings of all grades, in the city of Brighton and Hove.

== Associated buildings ==
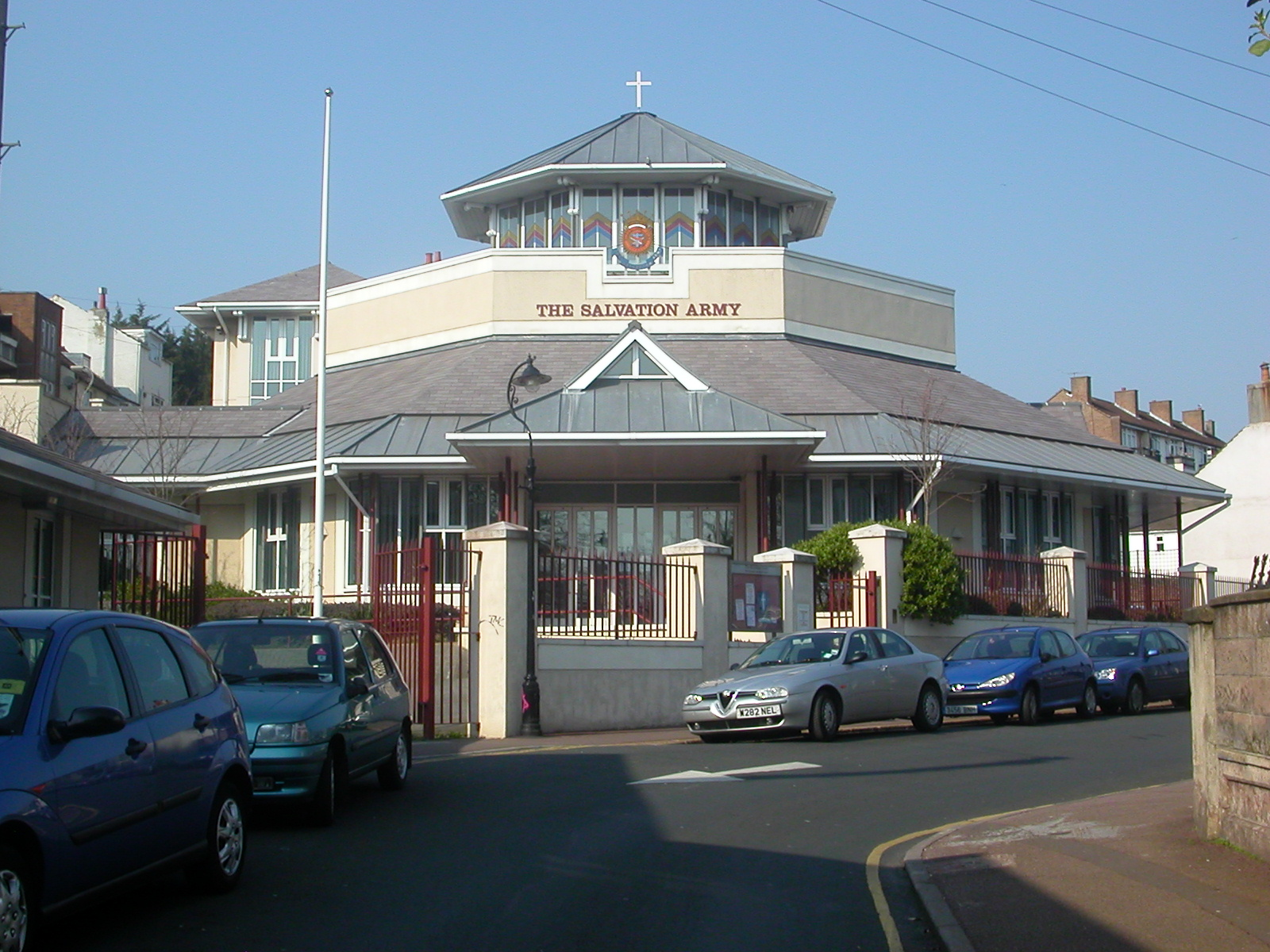
The Salvation Army Congress Hall at the back of Park Crescent

Park Crescent Terrace was built adjacent to the crescent on its west side. Numbers 1 to 16 Park Crescent back on to the terrace. At its south end, a Salvation Army Congress Hall was built in 2000 by David Greenwood of the Salvation Army Architects Department. The new octagonal building, whose gables resemble those on Park Crescent's houses, replaced a 1,400-capacity predecessor of 1883 on the same site. Another important local building, demolished in 1930, was the Gaiety Theatre on Park Crescent Place, which runs northwards from Park Crescent to Trinity Street. It was the Royal Hippodrome from 1876 until 1889, and held a popular circus. After a short closure, it reopened in 1890 as a theatre specialising in melodrama and music hall performances. It was demolished in 1930 and replaced by flats.

The wall along the north side of Union Road, which cuts off Park Crescent and the gardens from The Level, retains its original (1822) gate piers. It was badly damaged by falling trees in the Great Storm of 1987, but has been repaired. The original stone lions on top of the gate piers have been removed and replaced with copies. The piers themselves are stuccoed, and consist of a square plinth with chamfering, a square body with arched niches, a prominent gutta above a triglyph, and a cornice with stone lions on top. The gate piers were listed at Grade II by English Heritage on 24 July 1969; this defines them as "nationally important [and] of special interest".

== Architecture ==
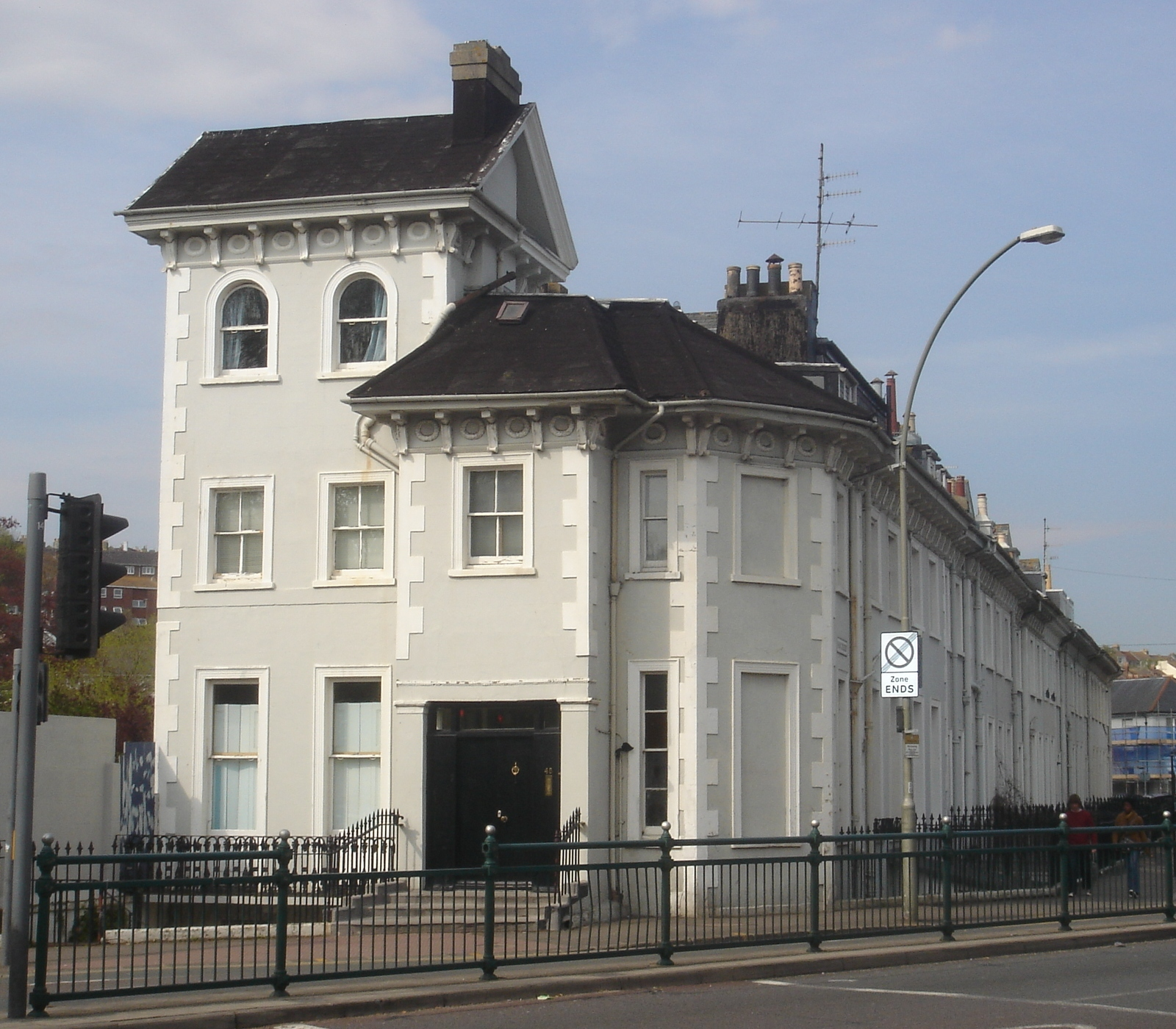
The eastern side of Park Crescent, showing one of the three-storey pedimented tower bays

Wilds adopted the then-popular Italianate style for his design of Park Crescent, which has been described as the most ambitious development of his architectural career. It has been criticised for being an unsuccessful composition, "showing ... his limitations as an architect" with the "muddled and disappointing" proportions of the interior (garden-facing) façades. The gabled roofs on each house are large in proportion to the rest of the exterior, giving a "top-heavy", "busy and awkward" appearance. This contrasts with the simple curves of the rear elevations, facing the streets on the outside. The gables form part of an attic storey which extends from the top of the two- and three-storey houses in the terrace. They are treated as 24 semi-detached villas at the front, but the rear resembles a plain terrace on all three sides. The linking element between the pairs of villas is a series of three-storey towers topped with pediments. These also provide a unifying element between houses of different heights, which has been described as a mark of Wilds's ingenuity.

The west and east sides match each other. Most houses have two storeys, but some rise to three; all have a basement and a three-window range with sash windows. The entrances are in the rear elevation and are paired under single doorcases with cornices, architraves and fanlights. The windows are topped by similar architraves. At the front, facing the garden, the hipped roofs of the main sections have prominent eaves, and the roofs of the tower sections have similar treatment. Number 1, at the southwest corner, has ground-floor rustication carried round on to its south-facing wall, and its windows are different. Similarly, number 48—the end house at the southeast corner—has a hipped-roofed south-facing wing with a hipped roof, in which the entrance is set in a doorcase flanked by antae. The corner of the house is chamfered and has a blank two-window range. Several houses in the east side of the crescent have dormer windows in their attic space.

The curved north side of the "horseshoe" consists of three-storey houses with three-window ranges. The entrances are again paired, and the windows are sashes with architraves above. Three-storey tower bays separate the houses.

== See also ==
- Grade II* listed buildings in Brighton and Hove
