= Prince of Wales Ground =

Cricket ground in Brighton, England

Coordinates: 50.833°N 0.130°W

- Interactive map of Prince of Wales Ground
- Location: Brighton, Sussex
- Home club: Brighton Cricket Club
- County club: Sussex
- Establishment: by 1791
- Last used: before 1800

The Prince of Wales Ground, also known as Prince's Ground, in Brighton, Sussex was the venue for cricket matches in the closing years of the 18th century.

== Location ==
The ground was on a site now occupied by Park Crescent and its surroundings. The land was originally donated to the Brighton Cricket Club by the then Prince of Wales. His patronage helped Brighton to become a powerful club that sparked a revival in the fortunes of Sussex cricket which lasted well into the 19th century.

== Matches ==
Four matches were played on the ground between September 1791 and September 1792.

== Aftermath ==
As the towns of Brighton and Hove developed, the land was sold a few years later and the cricket club moved to a new site in Brighton at Temple Fields, which was where Montpelier Crescent is now.

The Brighton club was representative of Sussex as a county and it ultimately became the main instrument in the formation of Sussex County Cricket Club in 1839. From July 1814 the club occupied the Royal New Ground (also known as Thomas Box's Ground), another Brighton venue, which was used for numerous important matches until September 1847, and was the county ground of Sussex in its early years. From 1848 to 1871, Sussex used the Royal Brunswick Ground in Brighton, also known as C H Gausden's Ground. Since 1872, the club has been based at the County Cricket Ground, Hove.
