= Henry Osborn =

Henry Osborn may refer to:

- Henry Osborn (Royal Navy officer) (1694–1771), admiral, governor of Newfoundland, and Member of Parliament
- Henry Osborn (cricketer) (1823–?), English cricketer
- Henry Fairfield Osborn (1857–1935), American geologist, paleontologist, and eugenicist
- Henry Osborn (politician) (1859–1937), Australian politician
- Henry A. Osborn Jr. (1884–1918), American politician
- Henry Fairfield Osborn Jr. (1887–1969), son of the above, naturalist and conservationist

== See also ==
- Henry Osborne (disambiguation)
- Harry Osborne (disambiguation)
