= George Humphreys =

George Humphreys may refer to:

- George Humphreys (civil engineer)
- George Humphreys (cricketer) (1845–1894)
- George Humphreys (rugby union) (1870–1933)

== See also ==
- George Humphrey (disambiguation)
