= George Humphry =

English cricketer

Personal information
- Full name: George Edward Humphry
- Relatives: William Humphry (Brother)

Domestic team information
- Years: Team
- 1845, 1848–1850: Hampshire

Career statistics
Competition	FC
Matches	5
Runs scored	87
Batting average	8.70
100s/50s	–/–
Top score	26
Balls bowled	–
Wickets	–
Bowling average	–
5 wickets in innings	–
10 wickets in match	–
Best bowling	–
Catches/stumpings	4/–
- Source: Cricinfo, 29 April 2010

George Edward Humphry (1816 – 25 January 1867) was an English cricketer.

Humphry made his first-class debut for Hampshire in 1845 Petworth Cricket Club. Humphry played four further first-class matches from 1845 to 1850, with his final first-class match coming against an All England Eleven. He died at Southampton, Hampshire.

Humphry's brother, William, played first-class cricket for Sussex.
