= Home Counties cricket team =

A Home Counties cricket team was a cricket team formed of players who represented counties which were considered a part of England's home counties. The team first appeared in 1862 in a minor match against Southgate Cricket Club. The team later appeared once in first-class cricket in 1899 against The Rest at the Central Recreation Ground, Hastings. The team for their only first-class match consisted of Arthur Turner and Sailor Young of Essex; Alec Hearne and Bill Bradley of Kent; Francis Ford and Andrew Stoddart of Middlesex; Bobby Abel, Tom Hayward and Digby Jephson of Surrey and; Harry Butt and K. S. Ranjitsinhji of Sussex. With the exception of Jephson and Turner, all had played Test cricket for England. Their only appearance in first-class cricket ended as a draw. The team reappeared in the 1940s, playing two minor matches against Lancashire in 1946 and 1948.

== Bibliography ==
- A guide to first-class cricket matches played in the British Isles (second ed.). ACS. 1982.
