= George Humphrey =

George Humphrey may refer to:

- George Humphrey (psychologist) (1889–1966), British psychologist
- George Duke Humphrey (1897–1973), president of the Mississippi State College, 1934–1945
- George M. Humphrey (1890–1970), American lawyer, businessman and Cabinet secretary
- George M. Humphrey (Nebraska politician) (1839–1894), American politician
- George M. Humphrey (Wisconsin politician) (1820–1866), American politician
- George Humphrey (naturalist) (1739–1826), English auctioneer and dealer
- George Humphry (1816–1867), English cricketer
