= Henry Osborne =

Henry Osborne may refer to:

- Henry Osborne (American politician) (1751–1800), public official from Pennsylvania and Georgia
- Henry Osborne (admiral) (1694–1771), British naval officer who served as Commodore Governor of Newfoundland
- Sir Henry Osborne, 11th Baronet (1759–1837), Irish baronet and politician
- Henry Osborne (Australian politician) (1803–1859), Australian pastoralist, collier and politician
- Henry Osborne Havemeyer (1847–1907), American entrepreneur
- Henry Z. Osborne (1848–1923), American Republican politician

== See also ==
- Henry Osborn (disambiguation)
- Harry Osborne (disambiguation)
