= Brighton trunk murders =

Pair of 1934 murders in England

The Brighton trunk murders were two murders linked to Brighton, England, in 1934. In each, the body of a murdered woman was placed in a trunk. The murders are not believed to have any connection with each other aside from how they were carried out, and the first of the two victims remains unidentified; a suspect was arrested and tried for the second murder but was found not guilty. Shortly before his death in the 1970s, however, he admitted his guilt.

The murders led to Brighton being dubbed "The Queen of Slaughtering Places" (a play on "The Queen of Watering Places").

== Unsolved June murder ==
The first murder was discovered on 17 June 1934, when an unclaimed plywood trunk was noticed by William Joseph Vinnicombe at the left luggage office of Brighton railway station as he investigated a smell. He alerted the local police, who contacted the Metropolitan Police. They sent Chief Inspector Robert (Bob) Donaldson, who opened the trunk to find the dismembered torso of a woman. When other stations were alerted a suitcase at King's Cross railway station was found to contain the legs. The head and arms were never found. The press named the victim 'The Girl with the Pretty Feet' or simply 'Pretty Feet' because the corpse had 'Dancer's Feet', thought beautiful. The post-mortem, conducted by Sir Bernard Spilsbury, revealed that the woman was about 25 and five months pregnant. Neither the victim nor her murderer was ever identified.

Chief Inspector Donaldson suspected a local abortionist named Massiah based on what was known about him and on Spilsbury's notes:

Internal examination of the torso had not revealed the cause of death; the legs and feet found at King's Cross belonged to the torso; the victim had been well nourished; she had been not younger than twenty-one and not older than twenty-eight, had stood about five feet two inches, and had weighed roughly eight and a half stones; she was five months pregnant at the time of death.

Donaldson asked officers to watch Massiah covertly. One, drafted from Hove, confronted Massiah, expecting him to come quietly. Instead, the doctor wrote a list of names of such prominent and powerful persons that "...it seemed to the policeman that the sun had gone in: all of a sudden the consulting room was a place of sombre shadows....".

The policeman did not tell Donaldson about the confrontation; he heard only when he was warned by a senior officer to back off Massiah. Massiah moved to London where a woman died while he was performing an abortion, yet he evaded prosecution. He remained on the General Medical Register and was removed only after he failed to re-register in 1952, following his retirement to Port of Spain, Trinidad. Spilsbury, always on the lookout for evidence of illegal abortions, described no evidence of interference with the pregnancy, and noted that the dismemberment showed no particular anatomical skill.

In 2020, the BBC One documentary Dark Land: Hunting the Killers suggested that George Shotton could be the murderer of the unidentified woman. George Shotton was posthumously named as the murderer of his wife Mamie Stuart at the inquest into her death in 1961.

== Violette Kaye and Toni Mancini ==
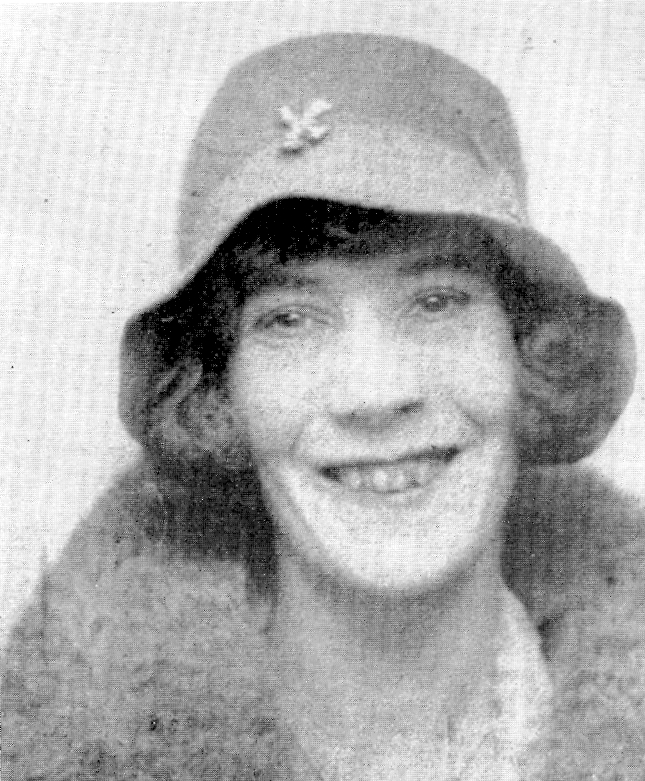
Violette Kaye

Although the first murder was unrelated to the second, it did lead to the discovery of the second trunk murder.

The victim was Violette Kaye (née Watts, also known as Saunders), aged 42. She had been a dancer and sex worker in London, where she had met Toni Mancini, aged 26, who had a criminal record, including theft and loitering, but who worked as a waiter and bouncer. He was also known as Cecil Louis England (his real name), Jack Notyre, Tony English and Hyman Gold. They moved to Brighton together in September 1933 and lived at various addresses.

Kaye and Mancini's relationship was tempestuous. One argument occurred on 10 May 1934 at the Skylark café on the seafront, where Mancini worked, when a drunk Kaye accused him of being romantically involved with a teenage waitress called Elizabeth Attrell. Kaye was never seen again and the following day Mancini told friends she had gone to Paris and gave some of her clothes and belongings to Attrell. Her sister-in-law also received a telegram that read "Going abroad. Good job. Sail Sunday. Will write. --Vi"; it was later established that this had been sent from Brighton that morning, by which time Kaye was already dead.

Mancini then took new lodgings in 52 Kemp Street, close to the station, and transported a trunk to his new flat by handcart. He put the trunk, with Kaye's non-dismembered body inside it, at the foot of his bed, covered it with a cloth and used it as a coffee table – in spite of the smell and leaking fluids, of which visitors complained.

Kaye's absence had been noted by police and Mancini was questioned. Apparently panicked, he went on the run. During the investigation related to the unsolved trunk murder, police searched premises close to the station and stumbled upon Kaye's remains in Mancini's lodgings. The post mortem was also carried out by Spilsbury.

=== Trial ===
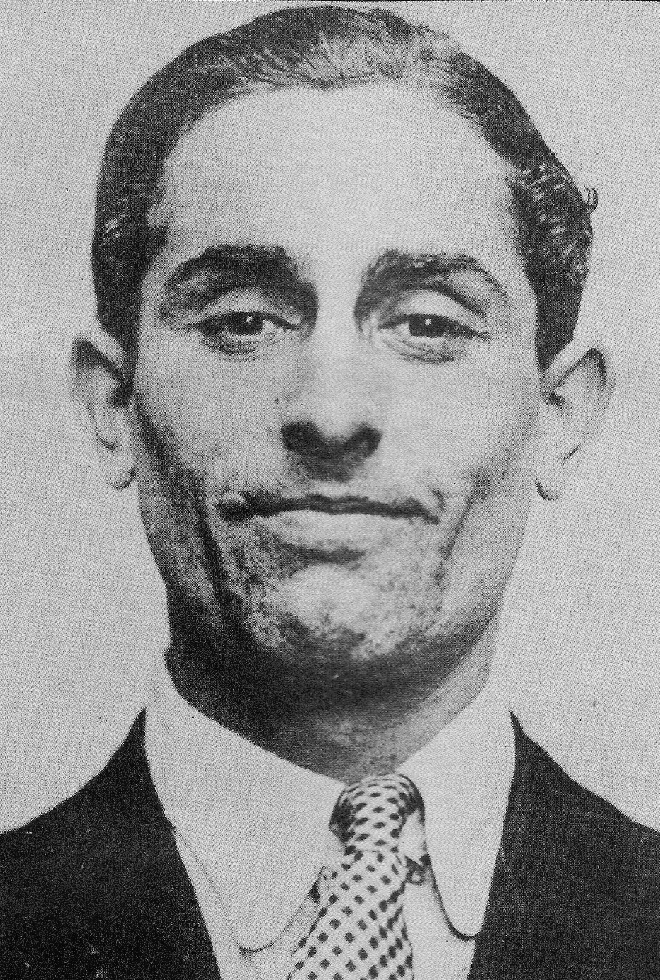
Mancini

Mancini was arrested on Eltham Road in southeast London on 17 July and his five-day trial opened in December 1934 in Lewes Assizes. The prosecution was led by James Dale Cassells and on his team was Quintin Hogg (later Lord Hailsham). Norman Birkett was the defence counsel.

The prosecution focused on Kaye's death by a blow to the head. A graphologist confirmed the handwriting on the form for the telegram sent to Kaye's sister matched that on menus Mancini had written at the Skylark café. One witness, Doris Saville, said Mancini had asked her to provide a false alibi. Other witnesses, friends of Mancini, claimed he boasted in the days after the murder of giving his "missus" the biggest hiding of her life.

Birkett's defence focused on Kaye's sex work and character. Mancini claimed he had discovered Kaye's body at the flat at 44 Park Crescent, Brighton. Thinking the police would not believe his story because he had a criminal record, he kept the matter a secret and put her body in a trunk. Birkett speculated she could have been murdered by a client or fallen down steps into the flat.

The quality and nature of the forensic evidence were also drawn into doubt by the defence who queried the amount of morphine in Kaye's blood and proved that items of clothing stained with blood had been purchased after Kaye's death. The testimony of Spilsbury, whose illustrious career as Principal Home Office Pathologist was already in decline, was effectively demolished by the well-planned cross-examination and closing speech of Norman Birkett. A number of witnesses also confirmed that Mancini and Kaye had seemed a contented couple. After two and a quarter hours the jury returned a verdict of not guilty.

In 1976 Mancini confessed to a News of the World journalist. He explained that during a blazing row with Kaye, she had attacked him with the hammer he had used to break coal for their fire. He had wrestled the hammer from her, but when she had demanded it back, he had thrown it at her, hitting her on the left temple. A prosecution of Mancini for perjury was considered but rejected due to lack of corroboration.

The case was dramatised in a 1951 episode of Orson Welles' radio drama The Black Museum titled "The Hammerhead" (with the story being changed to reveal the victim's sister as the killer).

== 1831 murder ==
The press attention to the 1934 trunk murders revived interest in a previous Brighton trunk murder. In the 19th century, John Holloway murdered his wife Celia Holloway, a painter on the Chain Pier, then transported her body in a trunk on a wheelbarrow to Lover's Walk in Preston Park, Brighton and buried the remains. Holloway was arrested, tried in Lewes and hanged at Horsham jail on 16 December 1831.

== See also ==
- List of unsolved murders in the United Kingdom
