= Priory Meadow Shopping Centre =

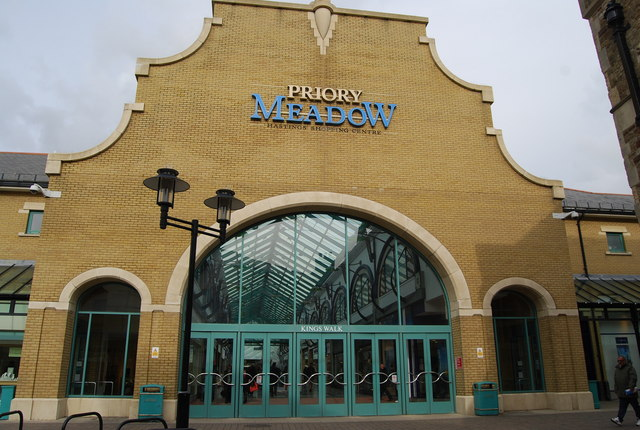
- Location: Hastings, East Sussex, England
- Coordinates: 50.857°N 0.581°E
- Opened: 1997
- Developer: Boots
- Num. of stores: 56
- Floor area: 420,000 ft^{2} (39,000 m^{2})
- Floors: 1
- Parking: 1000 cars
- Website: www.priorymeadow.com

Priory Meadow Shopping Centre is a shopping centre in Hastings, East Sussex, England. The centre was opened in 1997 by Queen Elizabeth II.

The building was built on the site of the Central Recreation Ground, which had originally opened in 1864 and had since remained the main cricket venue in the town. This history is reflected by the statue in Queens Square of a batsman holding a pose having played a shot (The Spirit of Cricket by Allan Sly). The observant shopper will be able to spot the ball that this batsman has hit (it can be seen in the wall above F. Hinds jewellers).

== History ==
The land on which the shopping centre now stands had been underwater before the 13th century, and was the original harbour for Hastings. A series of severe storms, silting and sea erosion forced the town to move to where the current old town is. The Priory Valley eventually silted up completely and the area became known as Priory Meadow and turned into farmland in 1536.

In 1864 the Priory Marshes were levelled and drained and opened as a Cricket Ground, by 1932 one corner of the ground was leased by the Maidstone and District bus company to use as a coach station, then in 1958 a row of shops was built on one side of the ground with seating above.

In 1982 Hastings Council voted for a shopping centre to be built on the cricket ground and to move cricket to Summerfields, now Horntye Park. In 1987, planning permission for 420,000sq.ft of space for shops was granted. Due to the onset of recession, developer Speyhawk pulled out. By May 1993, a new developer, Boots had been found and developed the existing shopping centre which was then sold to a private Irish investor and is managed by BTWShiells. A scheme of approx. 264,000sq ft now exists. In 1989 the ground hosted its last Sussex county game, when they beat Kent in front of a crowd of 1,000 people.

On 16 January 2023, the shopping centre was closed after it was severely flooded, as well as the surrounding area.
