= Harold Osborn (disambiguation) =

Harold Osborn (1899–1975) was an American athletics competitor

Harold Osborn may also refer to:

- Harold Osborn (cricketer) (1909–1986), New Zealand cricketer
- Harry Osborn, a Marvel Comics character

== See also ==
- Harold S. Osborne (1887–1985), American electrical engineer
- Harry Osborne (disambiguation)
