= Harry Osborne =

Harry Osborne may refer to:

- Harry Osborne (EastEnders), a character on the soap opera EastEnders
- Harry Osborne (philatelist) (1875–1959), British medical practitioner and philatelist

== See also ==
- Harry Osborn, a Marvel Comics character
- Harold Osborn (disambiguation)
- Henry Osborne (disambiguation)
- Henry Osborn (disambiguation)
