= Allan Sly =

English sculptor

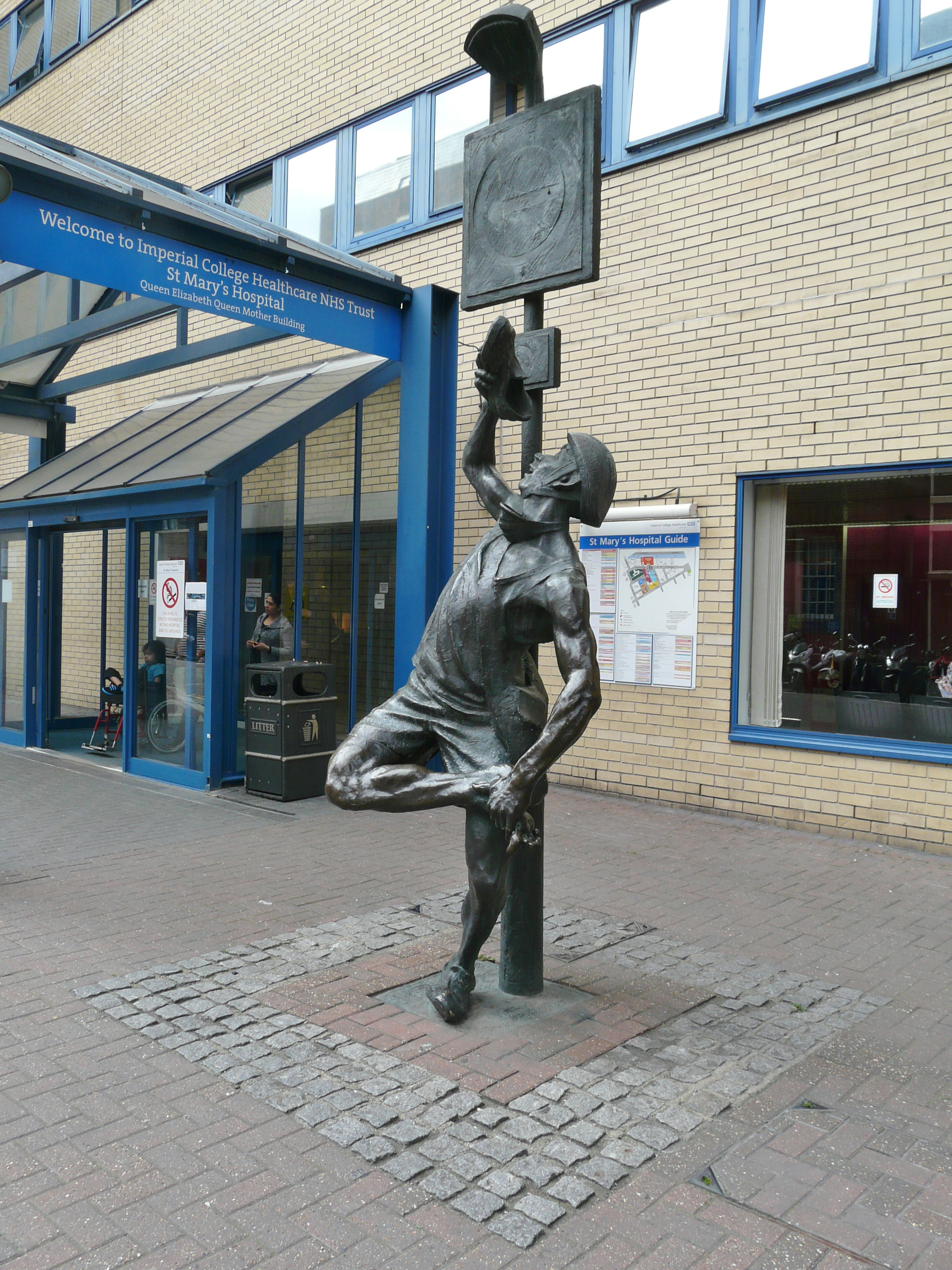
Sly's The Messenger at St Mary's Hospital, London

Allan Sly FRBS (born 1951) is an English sculptor and senior lecturer at Wimbledon College of Art, a constituent college of University of the Arts London.

Sly was elected a Fellow of the Royal British Society of Sculptors in 1992.

== Early life and education ==
Sly was born in 1951 in Windsor, and studied sculpture at the City and Guilds of London Art School (1971–1974) and the Royal Academy of Arts (1974–1977).

== Selected works ==
The Window Cleaner (1990), outside Edgware Road tube station in London, is a 10 feet (3.0 m) bronze statue of a workman carrying his ladders and peering up at the windows of the nearby Capital House for which it was commissioned.

The Messenger or Getting Back on the Right Foot (1993), outside St Mary's Hospital is a 14 feet (4.3 m) bronze statue of a man leaning on a lamp-post to replace his right shoe.

Runaway Rotavator (1994) in iron filled resin, was commissioned by Harlow Arts Trust for a site outside Harlow Sports Centre.

The Spirit of Cricket (1997) was created to honour the former Central Recreation Ground cricket ground in Hastings, and stands outside the Priory Meadow Shopping Centre which was built on the site. In November 2015 it was temporarily removed for repair, following impact from a fork lift truck.

The Pearl Diver (1999) was commissioned by P&O for their liner the Aurora.

Newmarket Stallion (2000), a collaboration with Marcia Astor, is a rearing horse with its handler, standing 15 feet (4.6 m) high on a roundabout near Newmarket, commissioned as a millennium project.

The Surrey Scholar (2002) in Guildford High Street was commissioned for the Golden Jubilee and posed considerable engineering challenges as the scholar balances on one toe and is on a steeply sloping site.

Masquerade (2005) is a 5 metres (16 ft) stainless steel sculpture commissioned by and for the Electric Theatre in Guildford.

The Surrey Stag (2009), standing at the entrance to the University of Surrey, Guildford, depicts a stag with a key, as used in the university's logo.

Alec Bedser and Eric Bedser (2015) are life-size bronzes which celebrate cricketing twins Alec and Eric from Horsell, erected at each end of Bedser Bridge in Woking.

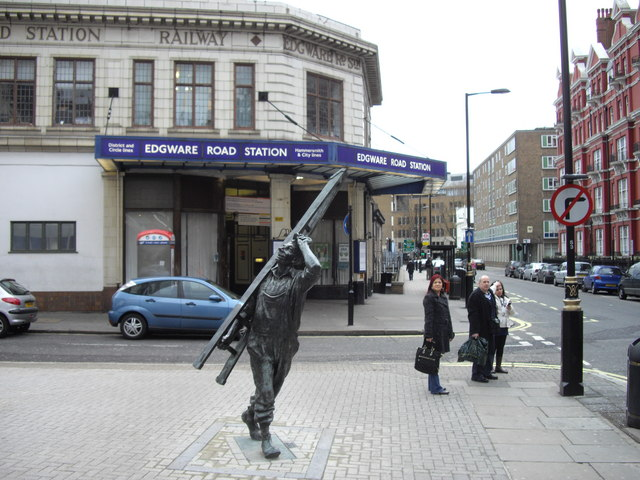
The Window Cleaner, outside Edgware Road tube station, London

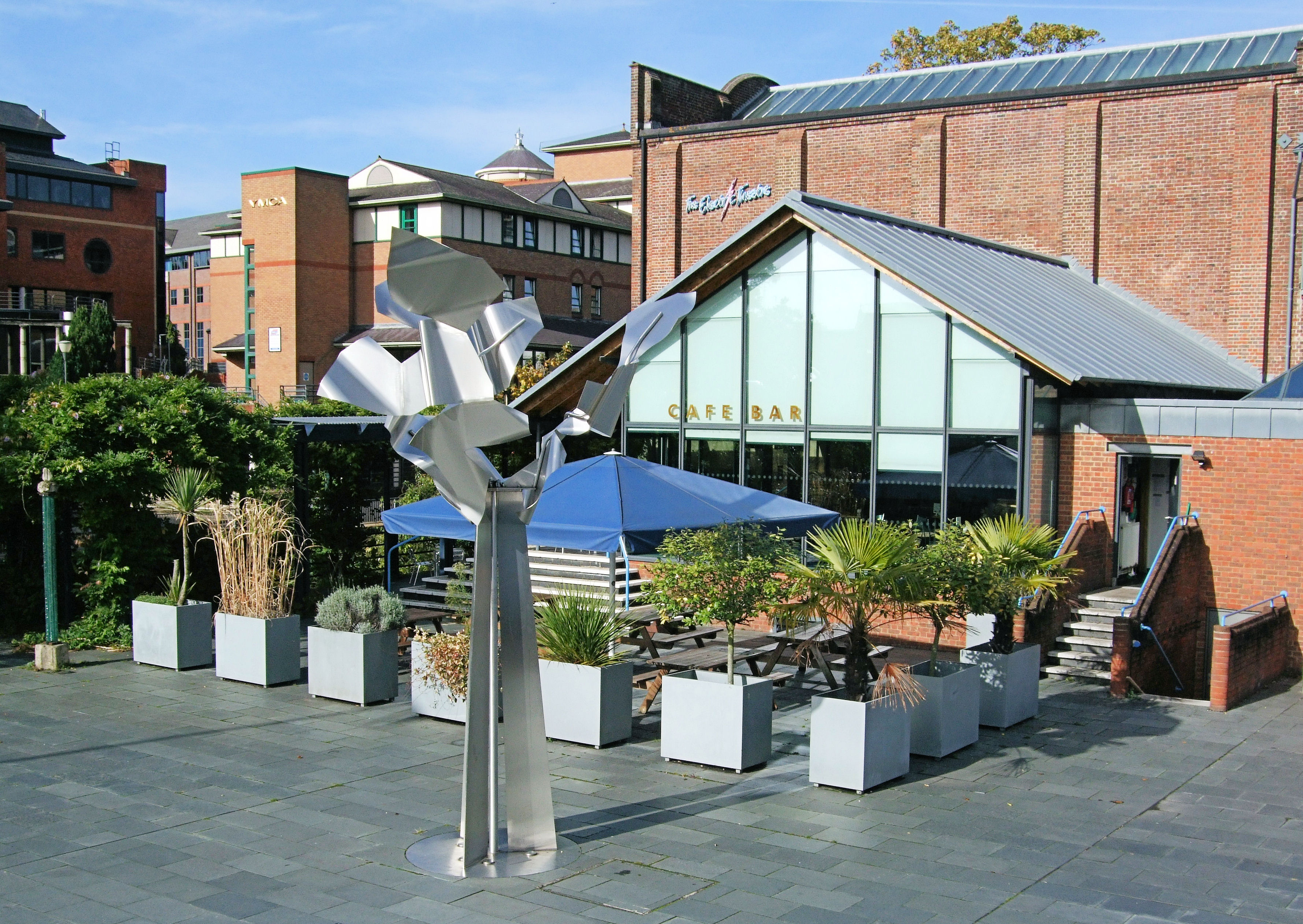
Masquerade at the Electric Theatre, Guildford

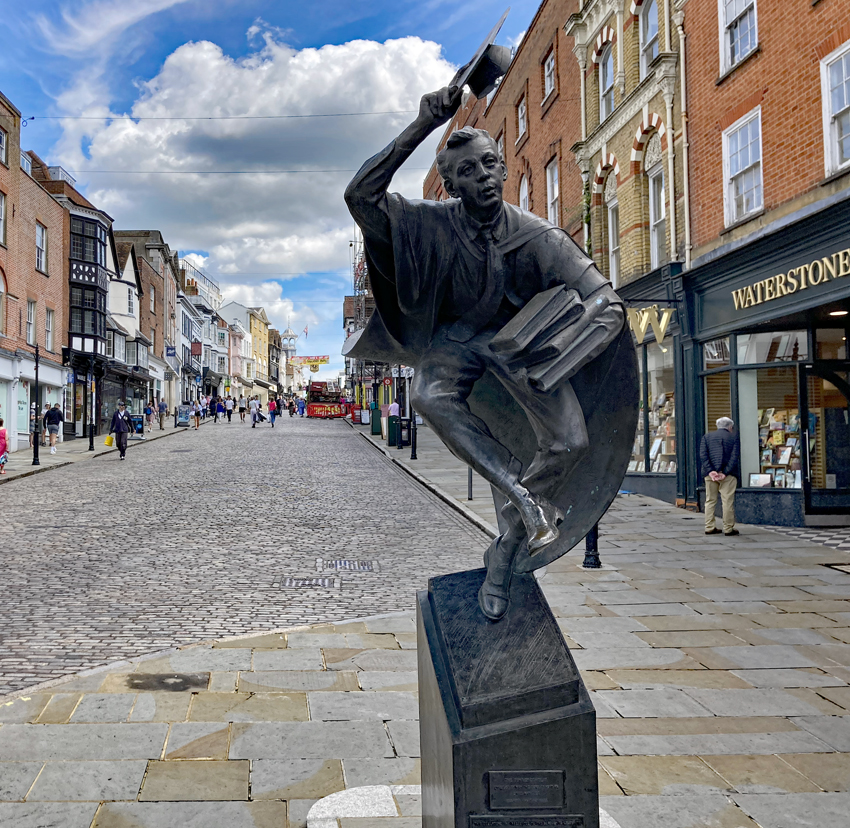
The Surrey Scholar, Guildford

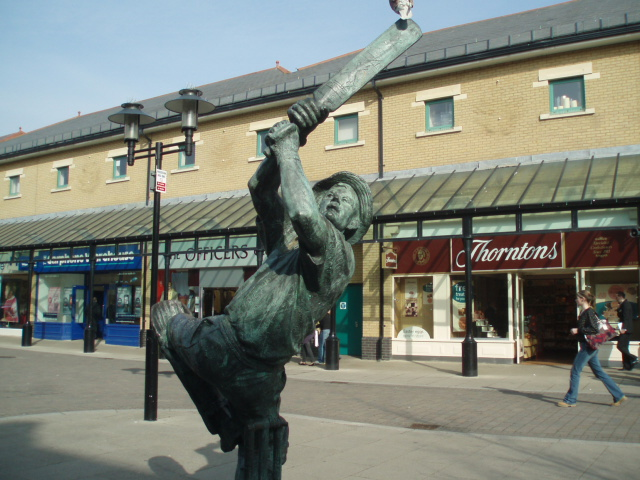
The Spirit of Cricket, Hastings

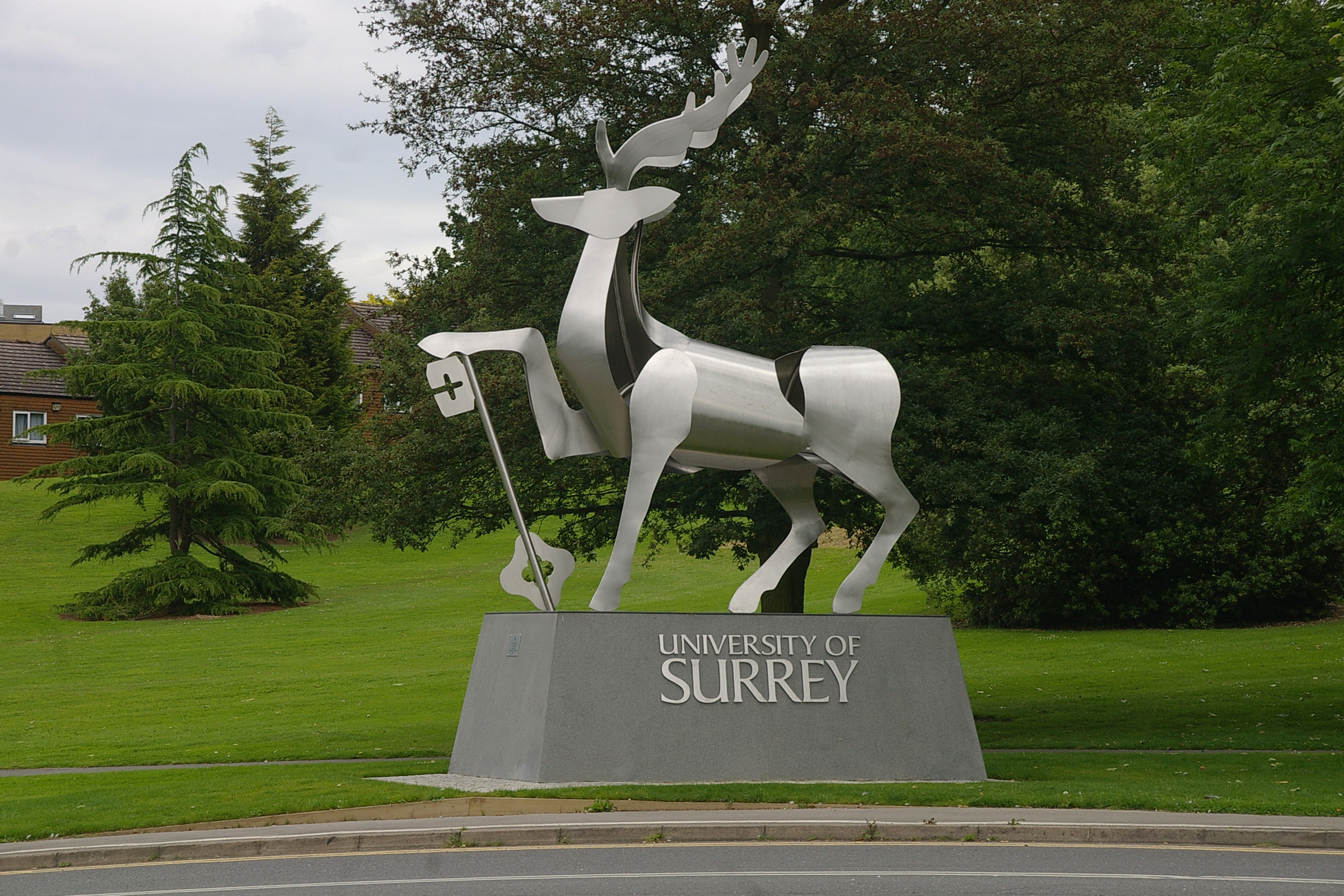
The Surrey Stag, Guildford

Newmarket Stallion, collaboration with Marcia Astor, Newmarket

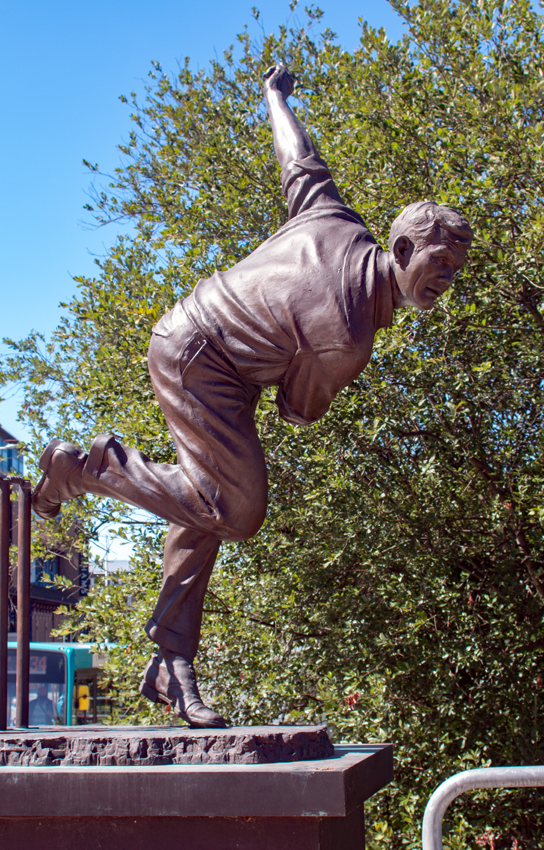
Alec Bedser, Woking

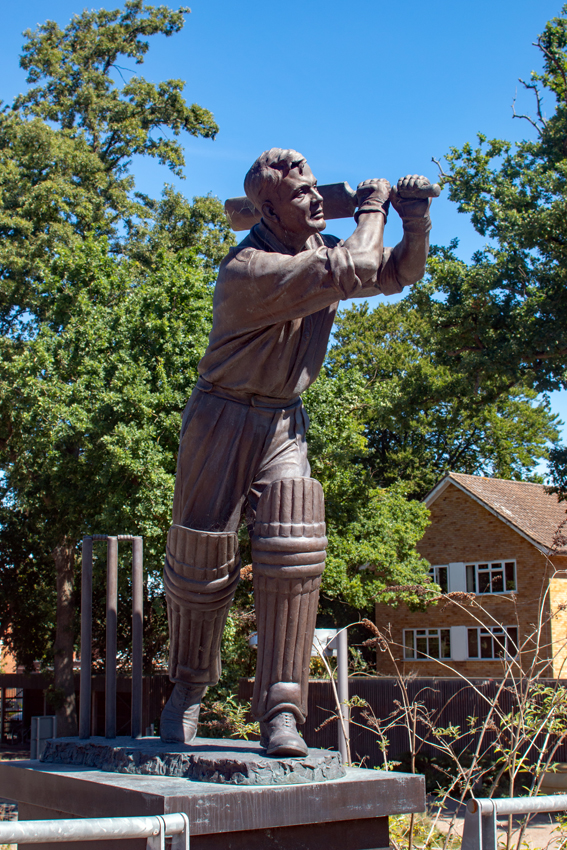
Eric Bedser, Woking
