= Alan Willows =

English cricketer

Personal information
- Born: 24 April 1961 (age 65); Brighton, Sussex, England
- Batting: Right-handed
- Bowling: Slow left-arm orthodox
- Role: Head of Cricket at SACS High School, Cape Town, South Africa

Domestic team information
- Years: Team
- 1990–1997: Dorset
- 1980–1983: Sussex

Career statistics
Competition	FC	LA
Matches	5	4
Runs scored	5	26
Batting average	2.50	13.00
100s/50s	0/0	0/0
Top score	4	14
Balls bowled	644	90
Wickets	8	0
Bowling average	31.62	–
5 wickets in innings	0	–
10 wickets in match	0	–
Best bowling	4/33	–
Catches/stumpings	0/–	0/–
- Source: Cricinfo, 17 July 2022

Alan Willows (born 24 April 1961) is an English former cricketer. Willows was a right-handed opening batsman who bowled slow left-arm orthodox.

Willows made his first-class debut for Sussex in 1980 against Hampshire. From 1980 to 1983, he played infrequently for Sussex, playing 5 first-class matches for the county. Willows played his final first-class match against Worcestershire in the 1983 County Championship.

Willows made his debut for Dorset in the 1990 Minor Counties Championship against Wiltshire. He represented Dorset in 51 Minor Counties Championship matches from 1990 to 1997, with his final Minor Counties match for Dorset coming against Cheshire.

In 1991, he made his List-A debut for Dorset against Lancashire in the 1st round of the 1991 NatWest Trophy. Willows represented Dorset in 4 List-A matches from 1991 to 1995, with his final List-A match for the county coming against Glamorgan in the 1st round of the 1995 NatWest Trophy.

Willows was head coach of Dorset County Cricket Club from 2009 until 2016. Dorset won the Minor County Championship in 2012. He is currently Head of Cricket at South African College School (SACS) in Cape Town.

He is married to Mardeen and they have two children.
