= Central Recreation Ground =

Former cricket ground in Hastings, England

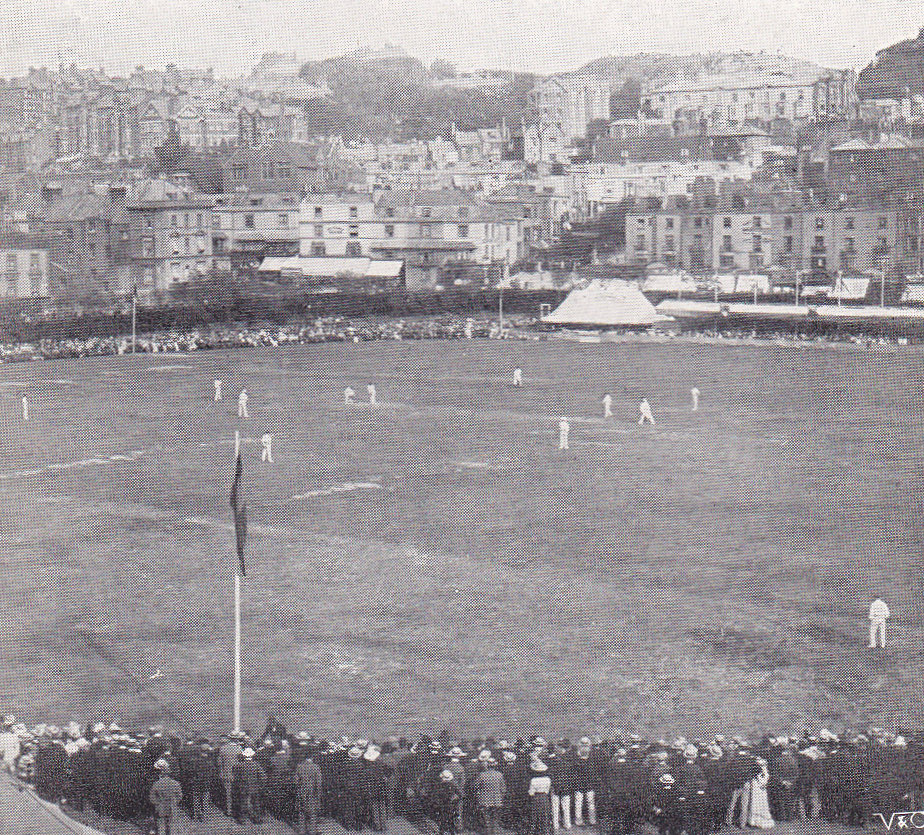

Ground information
- Location: Hastings, East Sussex
- Country: England
- Establishment: 1864
- Demolished: 1996

International information
- Only WODI: 24 June 1984: England v New Zealand

Team information
| Sussex | (1865–1989) |
- As of 6 September 2020; Source: CricketArchive

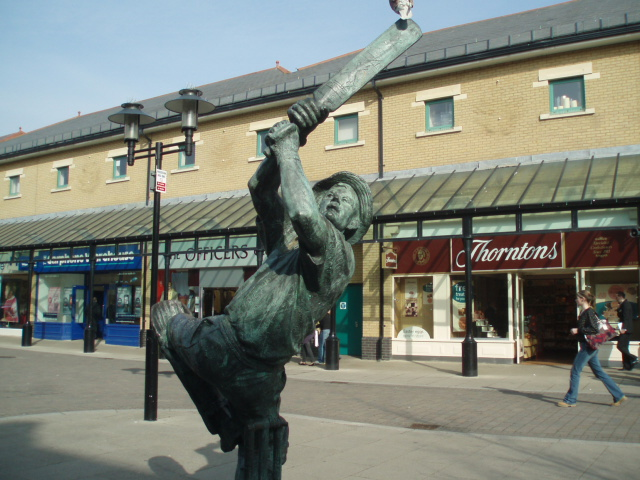
Statue of a cricketer located in the Priory Meadow Shopping Centre, which was built on the site of the Central Recreation Ground.

The Central Recreation Ground was a cricket ground in Hastings, East Sussex, used for first-class and List A cricket between 1864 and 1996. The ground was frequently used by Sussex County Cricket Club as one of their outgrounds from 1865; in total, Sussex played 143 first-class and 17 List A matches at the ground. (Note: Excludes two first-class and two List A matches where no play was possible) Between 1887 and the 1960s, the Central Recreation Ground also played host to the Hastings & St Leonards cricket festival, which attracted many other teams and notable players. In the early twentieth century, the ground hosted seven Gentlemen v Players matches, and notable players to have played at the ground include W.G. Grace, Don Bradman, Jack Hobbs and Denis Compton. Grace made over 40 appearances at the ground, whilst both Hobbs and Compton broke the record for most first-class centuries in a season at the Central Recreation Ground. The ground also hosted a women's one-day international between England and New Zealand in 1984. In the 1980s, planning permission was given for the ground be demolished, and the land used to build a shopping centre. After the demolition of the ground in 1996, the Priory Meadow Shopping Centre was built on the site.

== Cricket history ==
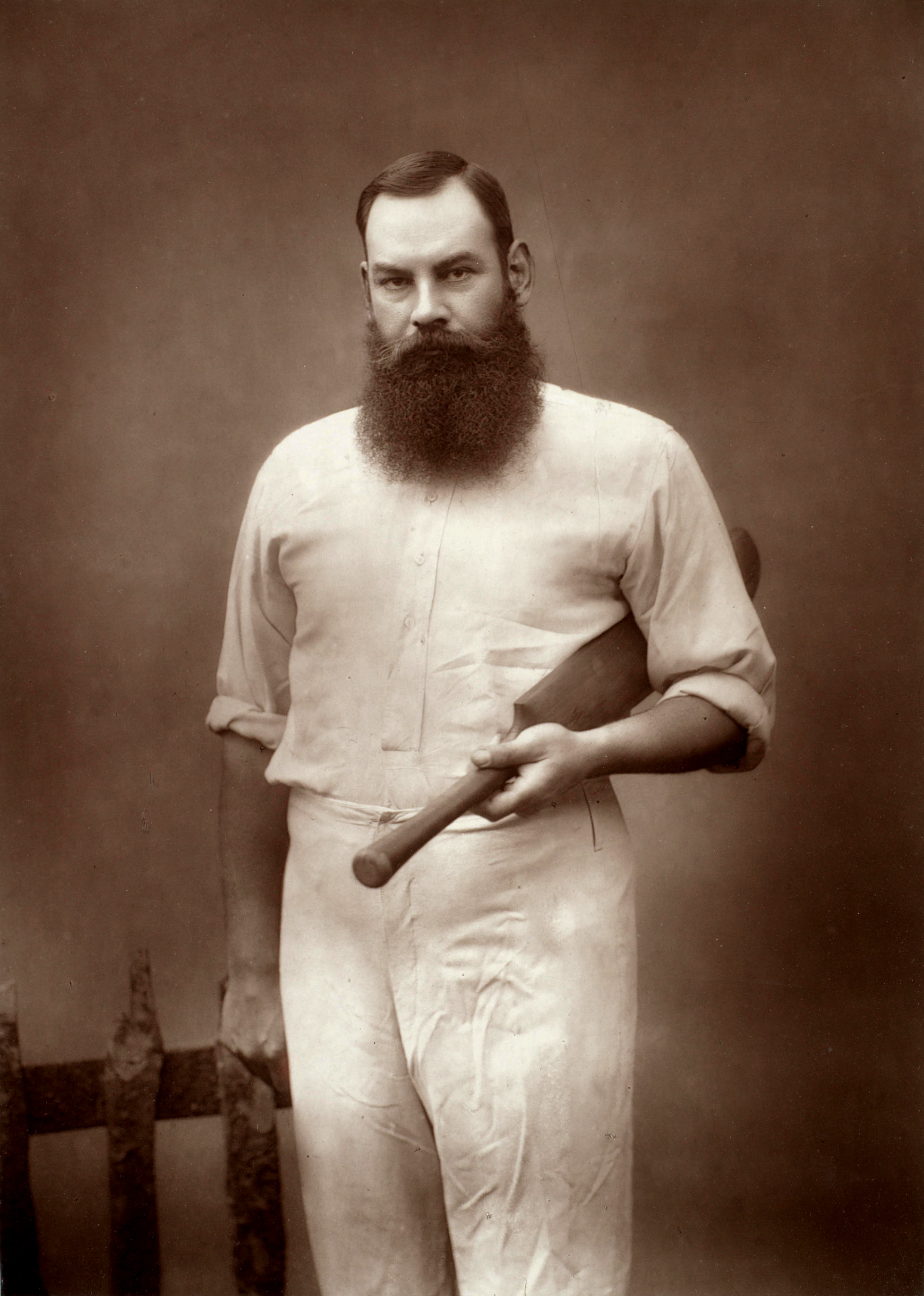
W.G. Grace, who played at the ground over forty times.

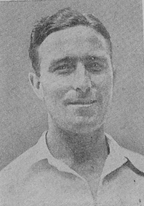
Denis Compton, who broke the record for most first-class centuries in a season in a match at the Central Recreation Ground in 1947.

In total, the Central Recreation Ground hosted 228 first-class matches, and 14 List A matches. The ground was initially leased from the Cornwallis family (the descendants of Charles Cornwallis, 1st Marquess Cornwallis), until 1869 when the ground was purchased by the cricketing trust. Between 1887 and the 1960s, the ground hosted the Hastings & St. Leonards Festival (Note: The festival was often just referred to as the Hastings Festival.) in September, which was the southern equivalent of the Scarborough Festival. During these festivals, seven Gentlemen v Players matches were played on the ground between 1889 and 1903, and in 1907 & 1909, matches took place between Gentlemen of the South and Players of the South. The 1909 match was the only first-class match played by British Army officer Leonard Slater, and was a victory for the Players of the South by 228 runs.

W. G. Grace played at the ground over forty times, and during the 1894 Hastings Festival, he scored his 98th first-class century for the Gentleman against the Players. Grace had captained a South of England team against an 18 of Hastings team in 1877, a match which was described as "a great success, and revived the game in Hastings". In 1900, a match took place between a combined Sussex and Surrey team against a Rest of England team containing Grace; the Rest of England team scored 355 in 3 hours 50 minutes. In 1902, a joint Sussex and Kent team played a Rest of England team, this time captained by Grace. In the 1902 Gentlemen v. Players match, Grace and Walter Reed made a partnership of 99 as the Gentleman scored 211; Reed top-scored with 56, whilst Grace's score of 53 was the only other score above 30.

During the 1925 Hastings Festival, Jack Hobbs scored 266, in a Gents v Players match; this was his record first-class score, and was also his 15th first-class century in the season, a new record. (Note: Hobbs eventually scored 16 first-class centuries in the 1925 season.) At the 1947 Hastings Festival, Denis Compton broke Hobbs' record by scoring a 17th first-class century of the season, in a match against South Africa. (Note: Compton eventually scored 18 first-class centuries in the 1947 season.) Compton was eventually dismissed for 101, although South Africa won the match by 9 wickets. In 1948, Don Bradman scored his 115th first-class century in a Hastings Festival match against a South of England team; his innings lasted 133 minutes.

The Central Recreation Ground also hosted many games aside from Hastings Festival matches. Australian teams played at the ground 18 times, with one match in 1878 involving a side with eighteen Hastings players, of whom six played for Kent, three played for Sussex and three played for Surrey. In a 1902 match between Sussex and Surrey at the ground, C.B. Fry and Joe Vine scored an opening partnership of 238 runs, and KS Ranjitsinhji scored the first double-century at the ground, as Sussex scored 705–8d, the highest total in a first-class match at the ground. The match also saw Surrey batsmen Bobby Abel and Thomas Hayward score an opening partnership of 246, the highest partnership ever for the first wicket in a match at the Central Recreation Ground. In 1908, a match took place at the ground between an English 11 and the Melbourne Cricket Club. A first-class match between Sussex and Kent in 1984 ended in a tie. In the same year, the England women's cricket team played a 55 overs a side One Day International match against New Zealand. Jan Brittin scored 101, as England scored 194–8, and in reply New Zealand made 148–7. The last Sussex first-class match at the ground took place in 1989.

In 1954, The Cricketer magazine noted that Sussex and Kent used to frequently play their matches at Nevill Ground, Tunbridge Wells and the Central Recreation Ground in Hastings; the article saying "amongst typical considerations which affect the issue are county weeks and festivals". The players' tea-room at the Ground had graffito saying "Victoria 1066"; Guardian cricket correspondent Matthew Engel joked that "Since the cricket ground is the only place in town not full of French students, this must have been put there by one of William's soldiers and could well constitute the longest-running gloat in history".

== Other history ==
Following the establishment of the Cinque Ports Volunteers' nearby Drill Hall in 1861, the ground, which was, in part, funded by the same benefactor of the Volunteers, Sarah, Countess Waldegrave, had a covenant attached that the Volunteers could utilise the ground for Drill and Parades. In 1869, the ground hosted an archery meeting for the Royal St. Leonards Archers. During the 1890s, the ground hosted local football matches for Rock-a-Nores (now Hastings United); in 1895, it hosted Rock-a-Nores' matches in the Hastings Carlisle Cup Competition. In 1896, the ground hosted a charity match between Hastings and Eastbourne, to raise money for Hastings Rowing Club; Hastings won the match 3–1, and the match raised almost £10, which was most of the money needed for the rowing club's new galley. Later in the year, it hosted another match between Hastings and Eastbourne, which Eastbourne won 7–2.

In 1905, the ground hosted a circus, in which American tight rope champion Hermann Davidson fell 60 feet (18 m) to his death after falling off the balancing pole during a performance. Davidson was 45 years old, and had begun training to be a tight-rope walker at the age of 10.

In September 1922, the ground held a Grand Fete, to raise money to repair the tower of Blacklands Church. In 1948, the ground was flooded, and the Public Health Committee report into the storm floods had to be withdrawn after a magistrate appeared to provide misinformation in his statutory declaration. In his declaration, he had claimed to have been at the Central Recreation Ground for two 15-minute time periods during the flooding period and claimed to have seen the flooding, but at those times, the ground had not yet been flooded. The ground had previously flooded in 1866, when one resident noted that it had been underwater many times within their memory.

== Demolition ==
In 1982, Hastings Council voted to relocate the Central Recreation Ground to Summerfields, and use the ground's current location for a shopping centre. However, this proposal was rejected by the Government in 1984, before the Central Cricket Ground Committee decided to move in 1986. Planning permission for the shopping centre was granted in 1988, and the ground was eventually demolished between 1996 and 1997, being replaced by Priory Meadow Shopping Centre. The shopping centre has a 10-foot sculpture entitled "The Spirit of Cricket" by Allan Sly, with an inscription about the location of the ground there for 130 years.

== Ground records in first-class matches ==
- Highest total: 705–8d Sussex v Surrey, 1902
- Lowest total: 53 England XI v Australians, 1888
- Highest individual score: 246 KS Duleepsinhji, Sussex v Kent, 1929
- Best bowling figures: 9–28 DL Underwood, Kent v Sussex, 1964
- Best match figures: 17–50 CTB Turner, Australians v England XI, 1888
