= Andy Dindar =

English cricketer (1942–2025)

Personal information
- Full name: Andrew Dindar
- Born: 26 June 1942; Johannesburg, Transvaal, South Africa
- Died: 7 April 2025 (aged 82); Reading, Berkshire, England
- Batting: Right-handed
- Bowling: Right-arm medium
- Role: Occasional wicketkeeper

Domestic team information
- Years: Team
- 1962–1963: Gloucestershire
- 1976–1980: Hertfordshire
- 1981–1984: Berkshire

Career statistics
Competition	FC	LA
Matches	7	1
Runs scored	100	0
Batting average	12.50	0.00
100s/50s	0/1	0/0
Top score	55	0
Balls bowled	150	6
Wickets	3	0
Bowling average	23.33	–
5 wickets in innings	0	0
10 wickets in match	0	–
Best bowling	3/32	–
Catches/stumpings	2/–	0/–
- Source: Cricinfo, 1 October 2010

Andrew Dindar (26 June 1942 – 7 April 2025) was a South African-born English first-class cricketer. Dindar was a right-handed batsman who bowled right-arm medium pace and occasionally fielded as a wicketkeeper. He was born at Johannesburg, Transvaal.

Dindar made his first-class debut for Gloucestershire in the 1962 County Championship against Leicestershire. From 1962 to 1963, he represented the county in 7 first-class matches, the last of which came against Worcestershire. In his 7 first-class matches, he scored 100 runs at a batting average of 12.50, with a single half century high score of 55. With the ball he took 3 wickets at a bowling average of 23.33, with best figures of 3/32. He left Gloucestershire at the end of the 1963 season.

Some thirteen years later he joined Hertfordshire. His debut in the Minor Counties Championship for the county came against Buckinghamshire in the 1976 Minor Counties Championship. From 1976 to 1980, he represented the county in 20 matches, the last of which came against Durham.

In 1981, Dindar joined Berkshire, making his debut for the county in the 1981 Minor Counties Championship against Buckinghamshire. From 1981 to 1984, he represented the county in 28 Minor Counties Championship matches, the last of which came in the 1984 Championship when Berkshire played Devon. Dindar played one match in the MCCA Knockout Trophy for Berkshire against Norfolk, and also played a single List-A match for Berkshire, against Yorkshire in the 1983 NatWest Trophy.

Dindar was groundskeeper and cricket coach at Berkhamsted School in the 1970s, and moved to a similar position at Reading School in the early 1980s. He and his wife Sheila had two children. He died in Reading in April 2025, aged 82.
