= Thomas Box =

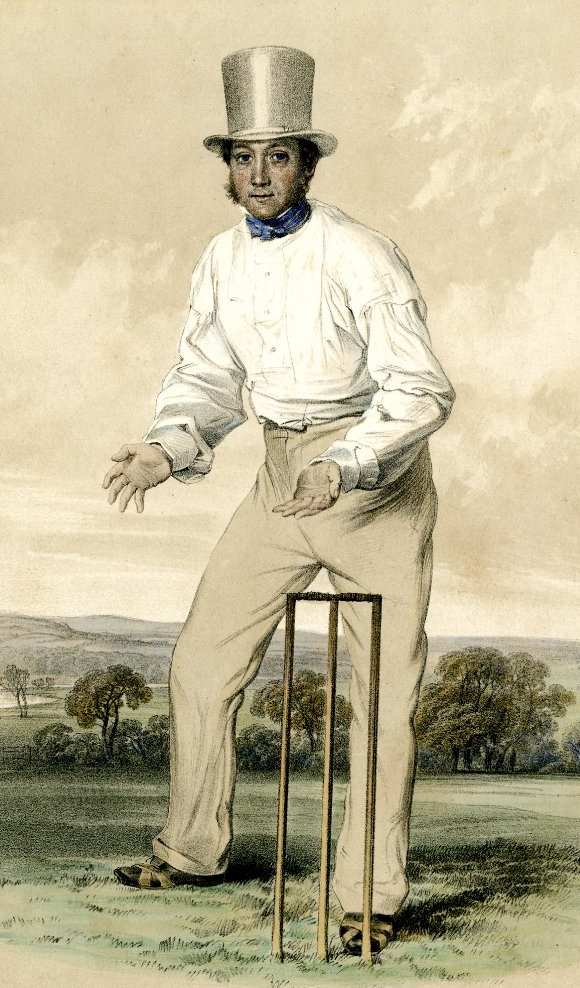

Personal information
- Born: 7 February 1808; Ardingly, Sussex, England
- Died: 12 July 1876 (aged 68); Prince's Cricket Ground, London, England
- Height: 5 ft 7 in (1.70 m)
- Batting: Right-handed
- Role: Wicket-keeper

Domestic team information
- Years: Team
- 1826–1856: Sussex

Thomas Box (7 February 1808 – 12 July 1876) was an English cricketer who is remembered as one of the most outstanding wicketkeepers of the 19th century.

== Player ==
Box played in historically important matches from 1826 to 1856. Although he played several matches for Marylebone Cricket Club, Hampshire and Surrey, he was most closely linked with cricket in his native county of Sussex. He played for the Sussex during the early years of roundarm bowling when his colleagues included Jem Broadbridge and William Lillywhite. He was a member of Sussex's team when the county club was founded in 1839, and continued to play for the club until he retired.

In all, Box is known to have played in 248 important matches. He was a right-handed batsman who occasionally made useful scores. He had 456 innings, in 43 of which he was not out, and scored 4,936 runs at an average of 11.95 with a highest score of 79. He scored 8 half-centuries. He bowled very rarely, style unknown, and took just 8 wickets but with a best analysis of 5/45.

As a wicket-keeper, he was highly successful, with a known career record of 236 catches and 162 stumpings.

== Groundsman ==
In 1843 Sussex County Cricket Club granted Box a benefit match and the proceeds enabled him to lease the Hanover Arms public house in Lewes Road, Brighton. This had the Royal New Ground attached and Box was called upon to manage the matches taking place there. As a result, it became popularly known as "Box's Ground". Sussex County Cricket Club used it until September 1847, after which Box leased the Royal Brunswick Ground, also in Hove, and the club moved there.

Box relinquished the lease of the Brunswick Ground to the club in 1863. In 1864, on the death of his wife, Box moved to London where he became a publican again but without success. His final employment was as an attendant at the Prince's Cricket Ground in Chelsea. On 12 July 1876, during a Middlesex v Nottinghamshire match, he collapsed and died three hours later.

== External sources ==
- Media related to Thomas Box at Wikimedia Commons

== Bibliography ==
- Haygarth, Arthur (1996) [1862]. Scores & Biographies, Volume 1 (1744–1826). Kennington: Frederick Lillywhite. ISBN 978-19-00592-23-9.
- Haygarth, Arthur (1997) [1862]. Scores & Biographies, Volume 2 (1827–1840). Kennington: Frederick Lillywhite. ISBN 978-19-00592-23-9.
