= Brighton Cricket Club =

Historical English cricket team

Brighton Cricket Club was based at Brighton, Sussex and was briefly an important team, playing seven important matches between 1791 and 1814. It is often seen as being representative of Sussex as a county.

Cricket in Sussex saw a revival during the Regency period that coincided with the rise of Brighton as a fashionable resort. The club had been founded by 1790 when it was recorded playing in four minor matches against other town clubs. In 1791, the Prince of Wales Ground became a county venue when Sussex played Middlesex.

Brighton played at the Prince of Wales Ground initially. As the towns of Brighton and Hove developed, the land was sold a few years later and the cricket club moved to a new site in Brighton at Temple Fields, which was where Montpelier Crescent is now. From July 1814, the club occupied the Royal New Ground (also known as Thomas Box's Ground), another Brighton venue, which was used for 49 major matches until September 1847 and was the county ground of Sussex CCC in its early years.

The Brighton club was often representative of Sussex as a county and it ultimately became one of the main interests in the formation of Sussex County Cricket Club in 1839.

Brighton and Hove Cricket Club maintained close connections to Brighton Cricket Club prior to the later becoming Sussex County Cricket Club.

During the 1970s and 1980s up to the present day a number of cricket professionals having played for Brighton and Hove have gone on to play for Sussex, Middlesex, Surrey and other counties and countries most notably England, Pakistan and South Africa.

The brothers Wells Colin and Alan played for Brighton and Hove Cricket Club before Alan represented England against the West Indies and Colin (Sussex), also brothers Willows Alan represented Sussex and Roly Middlesex during the 1970s and 1980s both played for Brighton and Hove. Other international players to play for Brighton and Hove Cricket Club include Tony Greig (England), Kepler Wessels (Australia and South Africa) and Andy Dindar (Middlesex).
