= Petworth Park New Ground =

Cricket ground in Petworth, Sussex, England

Coordinates: 50.98533°N 0.61593°W

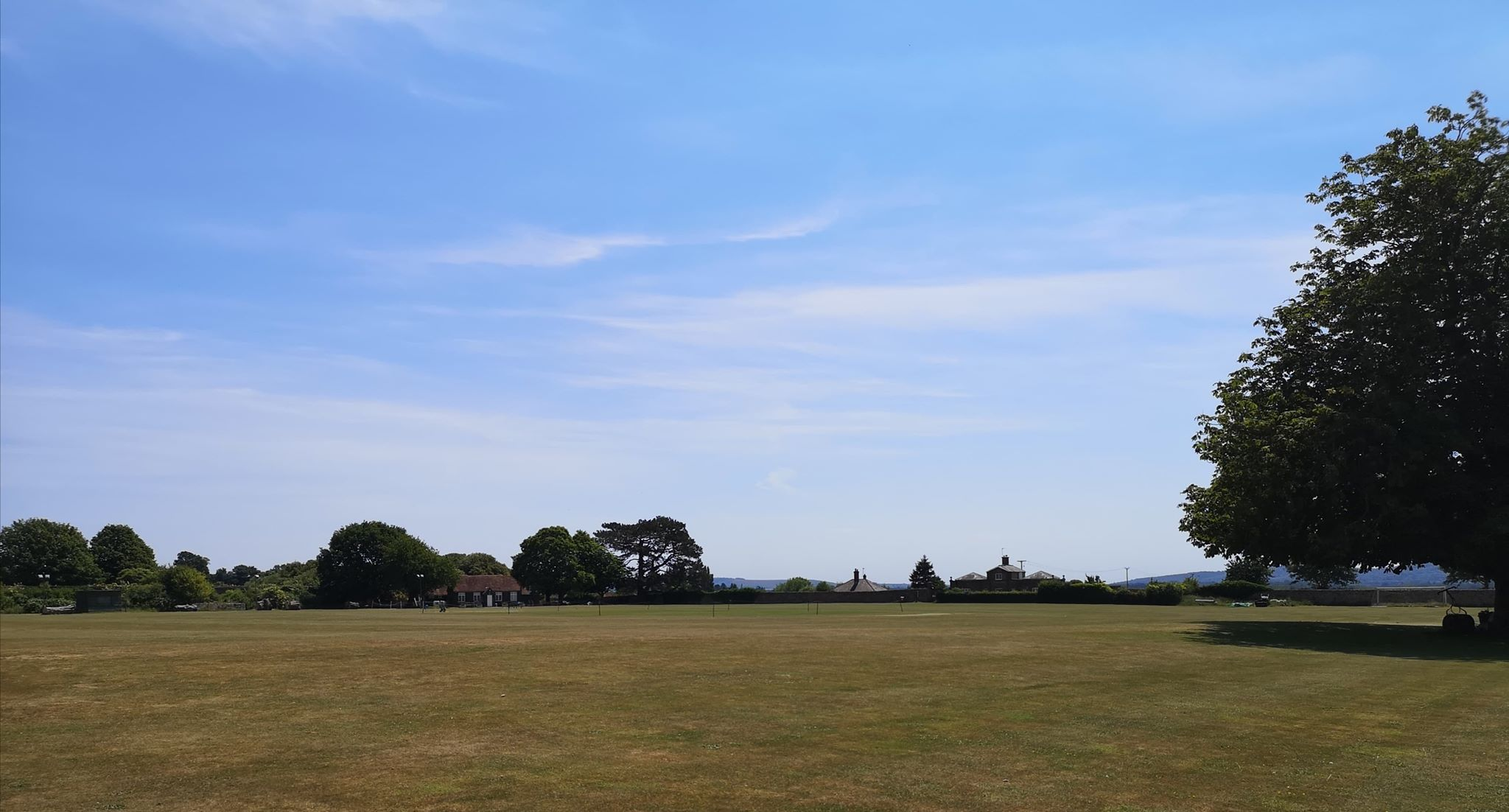
- Interactive map of Petworth Park New Ground

Ground information
- Location: Petworth, Sussex
- Country: England
- Establishment: 1844 (first recorded match)

Team information
Petworth Cricket Club	(1844-1845)
Sussex	(1849)
- As of 27 August 2010; Source: Ground profile

Petworth Park New Ground is a cricket ground in the shadow of Petworth House, Petworth, Sussex. The first recorded match on the ground was in 1844, when Petworth Cricket Club played the Marylebone Cricket Club in the first first-class match held at the ground. From 1844–1845, the ground held two further first-class matches when Petworth Cricket Club played Hampshire and the Marylebone Cricket Club. Sussex played a single first-class match at the ground against Surrey in 1849.

Despite the final recorded match on the ground being in 1961 when Petworth played South Hampstead, the ground continues to be used to this day and in local domestic cricket is the home venue of Petworth Park Cricket Club.
