= Royal New Ground =

Cricket venue in Brighton, England

Coordinates: 50.8324°N 0.1314°W

- Interactive map of Royal New Ground
- Location: Brighton, Sussex
- Home club: Brighton Cricket Club
- County club: Sussex
- Establishment: July 1814
- Last used: September 1847

The Royal New Ground, also known as "Box's Ground", in Brighton, Sussex was a venue for cricket matches from 1814 to 1847. Originally called "Brown's Ground" in the 18th century, it was located where Park Crescent, Brighton now stands.

The ground was the home of Brighton Cricket Club and became the county ground of Sussex CCC when this was formed in 1839. A total of 49 important matches were played there until September 1847. From 1848 to 1871, Sussex CCC used the Royal Brunswick Ground in Hove, also known as C H Gausden's Ground, and since 1872, the club has been based at the County Cricket Ground, Hove, its present home.

== Cricket history ==
Apart from important matches, the ground hosted a number of other matches. In 1845, the ground hosted two matches in benefit of fast-bowler George Brown. The first was a match between Sussex and an All England team, which was won by the All England team. The second match was a Gentlemen v Players match which was heavily interrupted by rain, meaning only 85 runs were scored on the opening day's play. In 1846, a match took place between the Zingari Club and the officers of the 12th Lancers regiment, which included Thomas Box, John Wisden and James Hodson. Box top scored in the officer's first innings, scoring 44 of the 110 runs. In 1861, the ground hosted a single day match between Southdown and Brighton College, which ended with Southdown scoring 509/5.

The last recorded match at Box's Ground was played in 1864 between Brighton Cricket Club and Eashing Park Cricket Club in 1864. Brighton won the match by 30 runs.

== Other history ==
In 1860, Box's Ground hosted a United States Circus containing the largest equestrian company in the world at the time.
