= Petworth Cricket Club =

Petworth Cricket Club was a cricket club based at Petworth, Sussex, and briefly held historically important match status, playing five known senior matches from 1844 to 1845. The club, which played its home games at Petworth Park New Ground, won two matches, lost two and drew another. Its two victories came against the Marylebone Cricket Club on its senior debut and against Hampshire in 1845 after the county conceded the match. A prominent member of the club was the Earl of Winterton who played in four of the five matches. Another member was Newman, who played in one match.

The club no longer exists, but Petworth Park Cricket Club today represents the town, playing its matches in Division Three of the West Sussex Cricket League.
