= Royal Brunswick Ground =

Sports venue in Hove, England

Coordinates: 50.826°N 0.171°W

- Interactive map of Royal Brunswick Ground
- Location: Hove, Sussex
- Home club: Brighton Cricket Club
- County club: Sussex
- Establishment: 1848
- Last used: 1871

The Royal Brunswick Ground, also known as "C H Gausden's Ground", in Hove, Sussex was a venue for cricket matches from 1848 to 1871. The ground was situated to the west of the Brunswick Town area of Hove, roughly where Third and Fourth Avenues are today. As the land near the seafront was required for the expansion of the town, the club moved in 1872.

The ground was the home of Sussex County Cricket Club which had previously (1814–1847) been based at the Royal New Ground. In all, 64 important matches were played at the Royal Brunswick. The ground was used for many non-Sussex county matches, for example in 1864, a "Gentleman of Sussex" team played against a "Gentleman of South Wales" team. This match included the first ever century in the career of W.G.Grace who struck 170 guesting for the South Wales team just before his 16th birthday, putting on 188 for the second wicket with his captain John Lloyd. In 1866, county players played a match against a team including nine "Gentleman of the County" and nine "Colts of Sussex", and in 1866 the ground was used for a match between Brighton Cricket Club and Eashing Park Club. Since 1872, the club has been based at the County Cricket Ground, Hove, its present home.
