= 1811 to 1815 English cricket seasons =

Cricket season review

The years from 1811 to 1815 saw the height and climax of the Napoleonic Wars, which had a catastrophic effect on English cricket by taking an increasing toll of the sport's manpower and investment. Only thirteen historically important matches are on record during the five seasons: one in each of 1811, 1812, and 1813; four in 1814, following Napoleon's exile to Elba in April of that year; and six in 1815, five of them after the Battle of Waterloo on 18 June. (Note: Any match listed in the ACS' Important Match Guide (1981) is historically important, and therefore of the highest standard, whether or not a scorecard might exist. The same applies to numerous matches discovered by researchers since 1981. For further information, see First-class cricket.)

Lord's Middle Ground was in use for three years from 1811 to 1813, after the lease on Lord's Old Ground expired. The Middle Ground was requisitioned by Parliament as it lay on the route of the Regent's Canal, then under construction, and the present Lord's ground in St John's Wood was opened at the beginning of the 1814 season. Among the leading players of the time were Lord Frederick Beauclerk, Billy Beldham, E. H. Budd, John Hammond, Thomas Howard, William Lambert, George Osbaldeston, and William Ward.

== 1811 season ==
Thomas Lord opened his second ground, now known as Lord's Middle Ground, ahead of the 1811 season. His original ground, today called Lord's Old Ground, had been the home of Marylebone Cricket Club (MCC) since Lord opened it in 1787. Lord decided to relocate in 1811 because of a rise in the Old Ground rent. He removed all of his turf, and relaid it at the Middle Ground, which was on the Eyre Estate in St John's Wood, west of Regent's Park. More precisely, it was in an area called North Bank at the northern end of Lisson Grove, just south of the present Lord's ground. MCC's members were opposed to the change, and the club followed Lord to the Middle Ground with great reluctance. It is a fact that no MCC team took to the field between May 1810 and June 1813.

There is only one match on record in 1811. This was B. Aislabie's XI versus George Osbaldeston's XI, played 8 and 9 July on the Middle Ground. Osbaldeston's XI won by 8 wickets. Thomas Howard, the noted pace bowler, took at least eight wickets in the match for Osbaldeston's XI. (Note: In this period, dismissal information in scorecards was never comprehensive, and a bowler was only credited with a wicket if the batter was out bowled. If a batter was caught or stumped, only the fielder was credited.)

== 1812 season ==
As in 1811, only one match is on record in 1812. George Osbaldeston's XI were again involved, their opponents being Lord Frederick Beauclerk's XI. The match was played 15 to 17 June on the Middle Ground, and was drawn. Beauclerk scored 86 of his team's 132 in their first innings. Osbaldeston's XI replied with 89, and Beauclerk's XI then scored 114 for a lead of 157. Osbaldeston's XI had reached 124/6 when time expired. Thomas Howard, this time in Beauclerk's XI, was again the best bowler with eight (bowled only) wickets.

== 1813 season ==
1813 was a similar story with just one important match on record, but it was also the Middle Ground's final season. The land was requisitioned by Parliament as it lay on the route planned for the Regent's Canal.

The sole important match in 1813 was Beauclerk's XI v E. Bligh's XI, which was played 7–9 June on the Middle Ground. Bligh's XI won by 28 runs. Batting first, Bligh's XI scored 142, largely thanks to an innings of 58* by Robert Robinson. Beauclerk's XI replied with 116 (Budd 44), and then dismissed Bligh's XI for 83. Needing 110 to win, Beauclerk's XI were handicapped by the loss of two batsmen who had been injured, and they were all out for 81.

That was the last of only three important matches played on the Middle Ground. A curiosity of the venue is that an amateur player called James Rice played in all three, and those were the only important matches in which he has been recorded.

Because of the war, cricket was by this time facing a crisis, and the ACS said "the game was all but dead". On 17 September 1813, the Nottingham Review commented: "The manly and athletic game at cricket for which the boys of Sherwood have been so long and so justly famed, it was thought, had fallen into disuse, if not disgrace...."

== Winter of 1813–14 ==
With closure of the Middle Ground certain, Thomas Lord contacted the Eyre family, erstwhile owners of the ground, and persuaded them to lease to him another parcel of land in St John's Wood, about half a mile further north at a place called North Bank. In the winter of 1813–14, Lord again had his turf literally dug up, and removed to the new site, where a high perimeter fence was built. Lord's Tavern, then a wooden structure, was also built that winter.

== 1814 season ==
Lord's new ground had a duck pond, and also the pronounced slope which still runs diagonally across the field from north to south. In terms of the modern ground, this is from the Grand Stand (north side) down to the Tavern and Mound Stands in the south. The drop is around 8 ft 2 in (2.49 m). Bowlers operating from the Pavilion End are bowling downhill; and uphill from the Nursery End. The Tavern was followed by construction of a wooden pavilion in 1814. The new ground opened in the 1814 season, with MCC playing Hertfordshire in what is believed to have been the first match there on 22 June 1814. MCC, whose team included Beauclerk, Budd, Osbaldeston, and Ward, won convincingly by an innings and 27 runs.

The first match of importance at Lord's was played 13–15 July 1814 when MCC hosted St John's Wood, whose team included Billy Beldham, William Lambert, William Ward, and John Wells. MCC won by four wickets on the strength of an outstanding all-round effort by Beauclerk.

On 22–23 July, Beauclerk's XI and Osbaldeston's XI met at Goodwood Park in Sussex. A total of twelve players made their known historically important match debuts in this game. One of them was Jem Broadbridge, who went on to become one of the great roundarm bowlers. Others included Charles Andrew, Francis Mellersh, and William Slater. Osbaldeston's XI won by 17 runs.

Brighton Cricket Club hosted Epsom at the Royal New Ground in Brighton on 28–29 July. Brighton won by 10 wickets, but nothing else is known about this match.

On 2–4 August, Beauclerk's XI played D. J. W. Kinnaird's XI at Lord's, and Beauclerk's XI won by 8 runs.

On 20 September, there was a match between Rutland and Nottingham at The Park, which Nottingham won by an innings and 163 runs. This is the first time that Rutland is known to have played as an independent county team.

== 1815 season ==
A discernible recovery began as the Napoleonic Wars ended, and six historically important eleven-a-side matches are on record. Five of these were played after the Battle of Waterloo on 18 June.

MCC played Middlesex at Lord's on 31 May and 1 June. In a low-scoring match, Middlesex (89 & 24) defeated MCC (31 & 66) by 16 runs. Two days after Waterloo, William Ward's XI defeated Beauclerk's XI by 9 wickets.

In July, the formation of an England team clearly indicated that the return of important cricket was underway. England played Surrey at Lord's on 12–14 July, and then played Kent at Napps, Wrotham, on 17–18 July. England (202 & 67/9) defeated Surrey (116 & 152) by one wicket. Billy Beldham had an outstanding game, scoring 73 and 36 for England. At Napps, England (85 & 60) defeated Kent (44 & 50) by 51 runs. Kent's team included John Willes, later known for trying to revive roundarm.

On 7–9 August, Sussex defeated Epsom by 21 runs at the Royal New Ground. Jem Broadbridge made his first known appearance for Sussex.

The first century to be scored at the new Lord's Cricket Ground was made by Frederick Woodbridge (107) when he opened the first innings for Epsom against Middlesex on 24 August. In the same innings, his colleague Felix Ladbroke (116) scored the second Lord's century. Epsom won the match by an innings and 358 runs.

== Bibliography ==
- ACS (1981). A Guide to Important Cricket Matches Played in the British Isles 1709–1863. Nottingham: ACS. OCLC 85045528.
- Altham, H. S.; Swanton, E. W. (1962). A History of Cricket, Volume 1 (to 1914) (5th ed.). London: George Allen & Unwin. OCLC 894274808.
- Birley, Derek (1999). A Social History of English Cricket. London: Aurum Press. ISBN 978-18-54107-10-7 – via Internet Archive.
- Green, Benny (1987). The Lord's Companion. London: Michael Joseph Ltd. ISBN 978-18-51451-32-6.
- Haygarth, Arthur (1996) [1862]. Scores & Biographies, Volume 1 (1744–1826). Kennington: Frederick Lillywhite. ISBN 978-19-00592-23-9.
- Warner, Pelham (1946). Lords: 1787–1945. London: Harrap. OCLC 877106024.
