= St Lawrence Ground =

Cricket ground

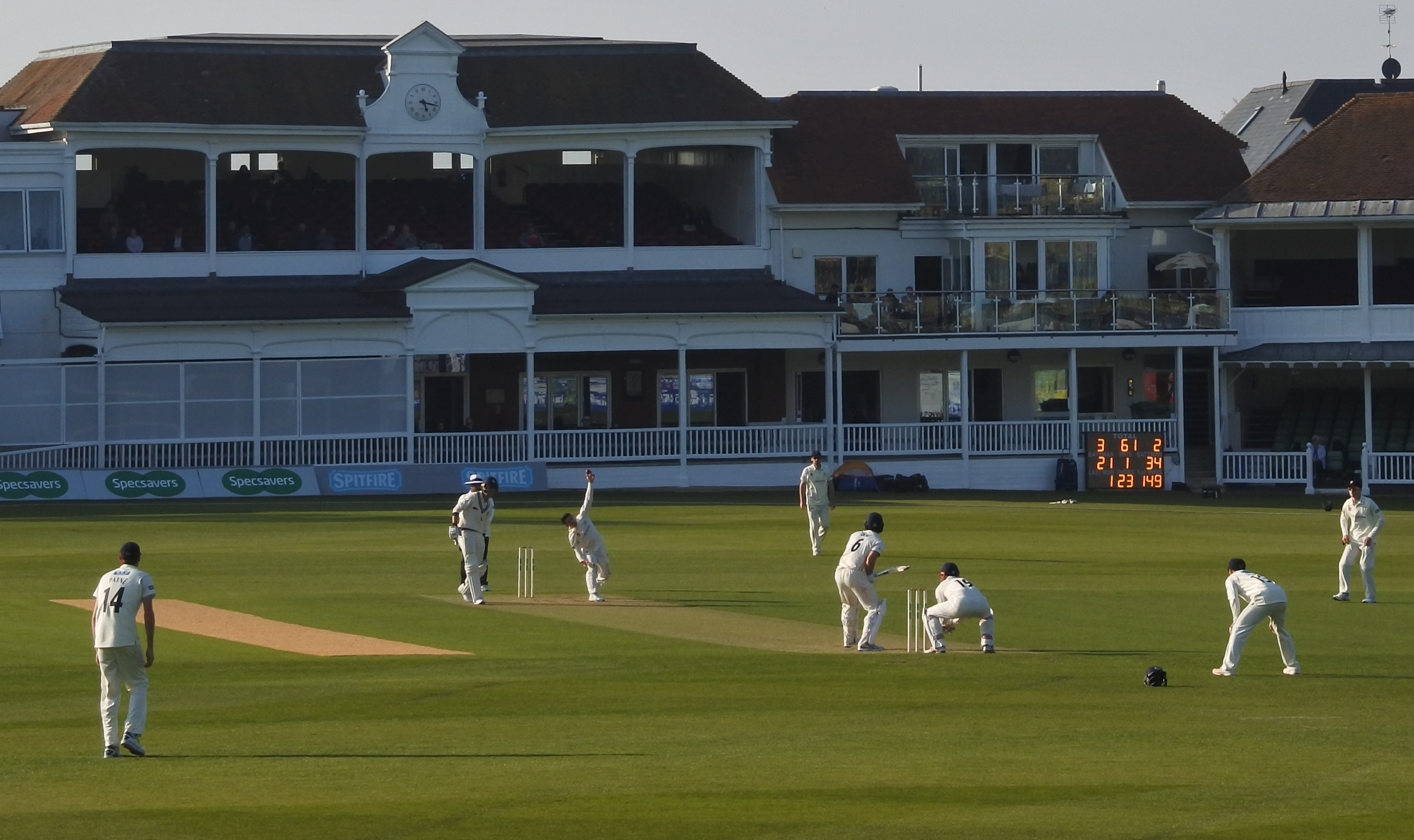
- Kent v. Gloucestershire at the St Lawrence Ground in 2017
- Interactive map of St Lawrence Ground

Ground information
- Location: Canterbury, Kent
- Country: England
- Coordinates: 51.267°N 1.091°E
- Establishment: 1847
- Capacity: 6,000
- Owner: Kent County Cricket Club
- End names
- Pavilion End Nackington Road End

International information
- First men's ODI: 18 May 1999: England v Kenya
- Last men's ODI: 30 June 2005: Australia v Bangladesh
- First women's Test: 16 June 1979: England v West Indies
- Last women's Test: 11 August 2015: England v Australia
- First women's ODI: 1 August 1976: England v Australia
- Last women's ODI: 21 September 2022: England v India
- First women's T20I: 26 June 2012: England v India
- Last women's T20I: 23 May 2026: England v New Zealand

Team information
Kent County Cricket Club	(1847–present)
- As of 11 July 2024; Source: CricInfo

The St Lawrence Ground is a cricket ground in Canterbury, Kent. It is the home ground of Kent County Cricket Club and since 2013 has been known as The Spitfire Ground, St Lawrence, due to commercial sponsorship. It is one of the oldest grounds on which first-class cricket is played, having been in use since 1847, and is the venue for Canterbury Cricket Week, the oldest cricket festival in the world. It is one of the two grounds used regularly for first-class cricket that have had a tree within the boundary, in this case the St Lawrence Lime.

Capacity at the ground was increased to 15,000 in 2000, and four One-Day International matches have been played there, one each in 1999 (part of the 1999 Cricket World Cup), 2000, 2003 and 2005. The ground was the venue for the first day/night County Championship match, played as a trial in September 2011.

== History ==
The ground was first established in 1847 on farmland owned by the fourth Baron Sondes. The land was the site of the St Lawrence Hospital, a leper hospital founded in the mid-12th century, and immediately to the south of the Old Dover Road, which follows the line of the Roman road that ran from Dover to Canterbury. A Tudor manor house had been built on the site after the dissolution of the hospital in the mid 16th century and this had been demolished by 1839. In the 18th century the house was known as St Lawrence.

The ground was laid out by Fuller Pilch, a professional cricketer who had been the groundsman at Town Malling and, from 1842, the Beverley Ground in north-east Canterbury. Kent County Cricket Club had been formed at the Beverley Ground in 1842 and the St Lawrence Ground was established to be used for their Canterbury Cricket Week in 1847. The 1847 Cricket Week saw the first important matches played on the ground (it became a first-class venue in 1864), with Kent playing England and the Gentlemen of Kent playing the Gentlemen of England.

Initially, the St Lawrence ground was used for cricket only during the annual Cricket Week, being pasture land for the rest of the each year. A St Lawrence Cricket Club was formed in 1864 specifically to use the ground more frequently for cricket. Improvements began to be made to the ground in the 1870s after the amalgamation of the East (Beverley) and West (Maidstone) Kent Cricket Clubs, forming the current Kent County Cricket Club. The ground was purchased for £4,500 by the county club from the 2nd Earl Sondes in 1896, a purchase partly funded by public subscription, and became Kent's headquarters, although it was only used for county cricket during the Canterbury week until well into the 20th century.

Prior to the purchase of the ground there were few permanent structures on it, accommodation during Cricket Week being provided in tents. The Iron Stand (now named the Les Ames Stand), built in 1890, is the oldest extant building on the ground; this was followed by the Pavilion, which was opened in 1900, and the adjacent Annexe Stand, originally built in 1907.

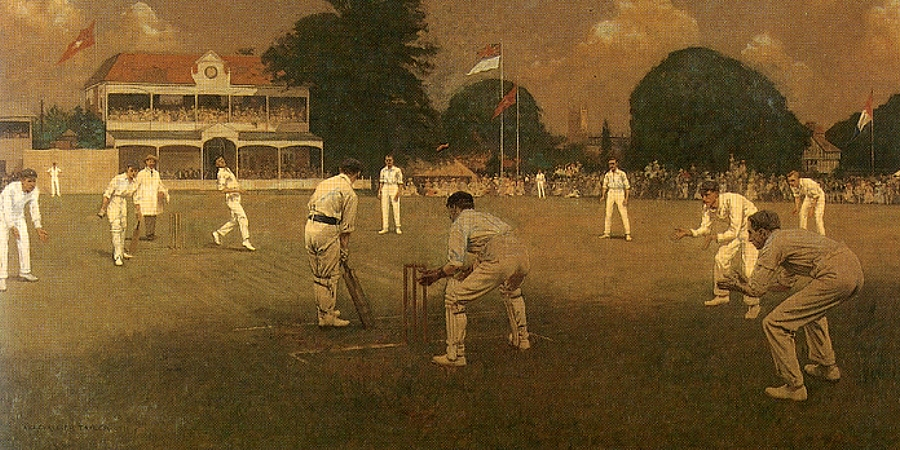
Kent versus Lancashire in 1906, by Albert Chevallier Tayler. The painting shows the Pavilion as it stood in 1906.

Kent's first County Championship title in 1906 was marked by the commissioning of a painting of the team playing Lancashire on the ground. The painting, Kent vs Lancashire at Canterbury by Albert Chevallier Tayler, depicts a view of the ground from the Nackington Road End with Colin Blythe, Kent's greatest pre-war bowler, bowling from the Pavilion End of the ground. The Pavilion can be seen clearly behind Blythe. The painting was hung in the Pavilion until 1999, when insurance payments proved too expensive. It was loaned to the Marylebone Cricket Club (MCC) and hung in the Long Room at Lord's. It was permanently sold to MCC in 2006 and remains in the Lord's Pavilion, with a copy hanging in the St Lawrence Ground Pavilion.

Kent won three more County Championships in the years before World War I. War was declared during Canterbury Week in 1914, although cricket continued until the end of the season and matches were moved to the ground from Dover due to wartime activity. During the war, the ground was used by the military and occupied by the Field Ambulance detachment of the South Eastern Mounted Brigade. Horses were stabled along the south team of the ground, including in the Iron Stand. During World War II the ground was used as an alternative civil defence control centre. The Frank Woolley Stand was built adjacent to the Pavilion in the 1920s, and the Colin Cowdrey Stand added in the 1980s. Significant redevelopment was undertaken at the ground during the early 21st century, during which land was sold for housing.

Cricketing feats to have taken place on the ground include the first triple century scored in top-class cricket, by WG Grace in 1876 playing for the MCC against Kent. As of 2018 it remains the only triple century to have been scored on the ground. Kent leg-spinner Doug Wright took his seventh first-class hat-trick on the ground in 1949, a world record that remains to this day. Six of Wright's hat-tricks were taken while playing for Kent, although only the last was taken on the ground.

Kent have played more than 950 top-class matches on the ground, including over 550 first-class games. It was the venue for the first day/night County Championship match, played as a trial in September 2011, and regularly stages day/night limited-overs matches. It has been used for four men's one-day international matches and for women's international cricket Test matches and one-day matches, as well as for games by England Lions and age-group teams. In 2014, the ground was the venue for the first cricket match to be played between the Vatican and the Church of England.

The ground has been known as The Spitfire Ground, St Lawrence since a 2013 sponsorship deal between the club and local brewery Shepherd Neame. The deal gave naming rights to the ground for a ten-year period to the company, which has been a long-term sponsor of the club and brews a beer named Spitfire. The Supermarine Spitfire is associated with the Battle of Britain, much of which was fought in the skies above the county in 1940 and after which Kent's limited-overs team is named.

== Lime tree ==
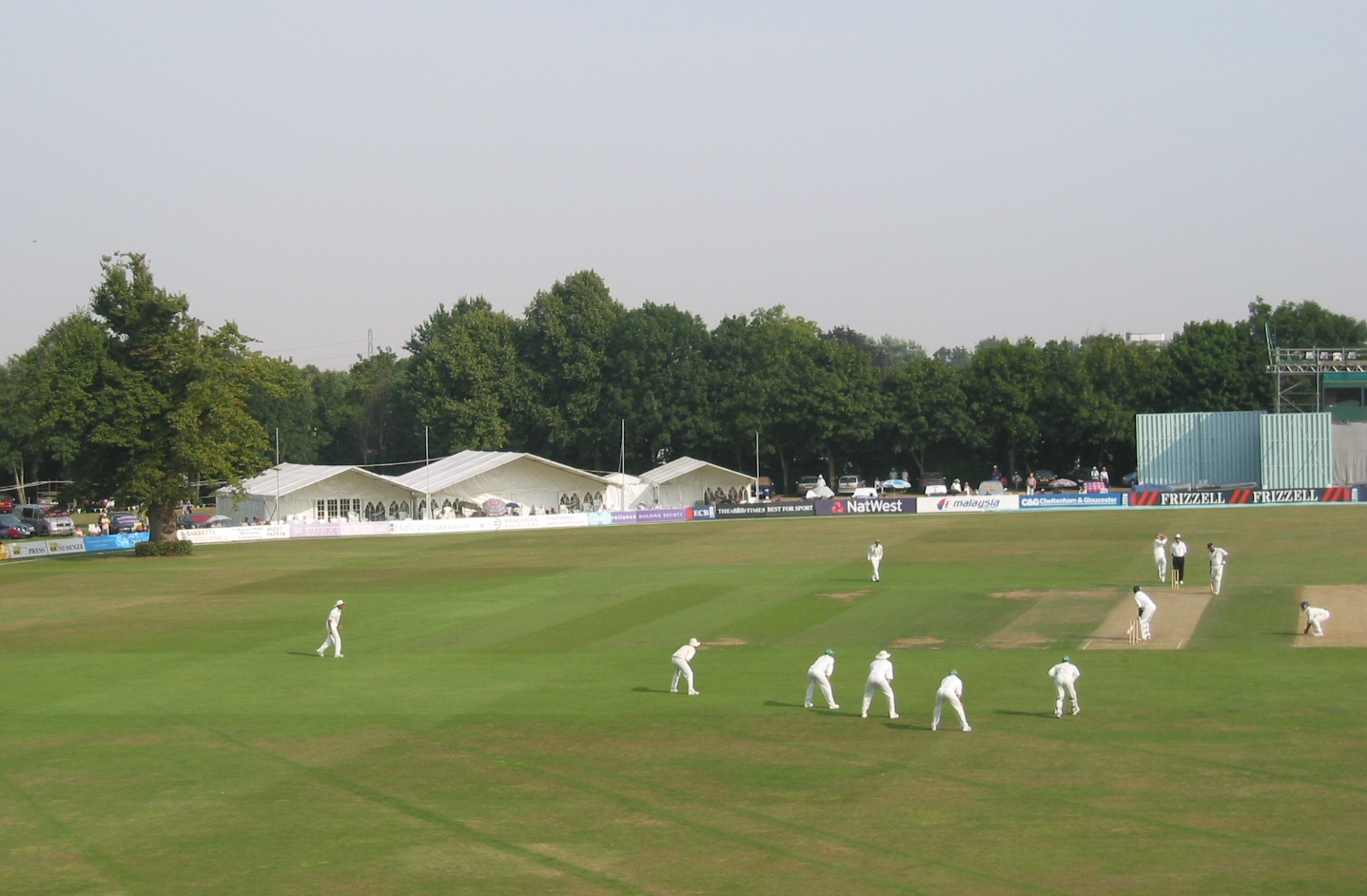
The St Lawrence Lime in 2003

The playing surface of most cricket grounds are devoid of any trees or shrubs. The St Lawrence Ground was an exception: when the ground opened in 1847 it was laid out around a pre-existing lime tree, which was then about 40 years old. The presence of a tree within the playing area required special local rules. Shots that touched the tree were counted as a four, even if they ricocheted and cleared the boundary rope, and no batsman could be out caught off a rebound. Only four cricketers are known to have hit the ball over the tree to score a six: Arthur 'Jacko' Watson of Sussex in 1925, the West Indies' Learie Constantine in 1928, Middlesex's Jim Smith in 1939, and Kent's Carl Hooper in 1992. (Note: When the tree fell in 2005 most reports mentioned only Constantine, Smith and Hooper. Frank Keating's article in The Guardian, however, mentions that Jacko Watson was the first.)

The tree was diagnosed with fungal heart rot in the 1990s, so it was pollarded to encourage new growth. This reduced the height from over 120 feet (37 m) to around 90 feet (27 m). On 7 January 2005, high winds caused the trunk to snap in two, killing the 200-year-old tree and leaving a 7 feet (2.1 m) stump. Wood from the dead tree was made into mementos and sold to supporters.

A new lime tree was planted outside the playing area in 1999 by EW Swanton, with plans to use it as a replacement. The club moved it within the playing area on 8 March 2005, though it was then less than 6 feet (1.8 m) in height. Redevelopment of the north side of the ground in 2017 forced the boundary to be brought forward, so it is no longer possible for the tree to be part of the playing area.

== Stands and structures ==
Map of the ground with stands and structures labelled.

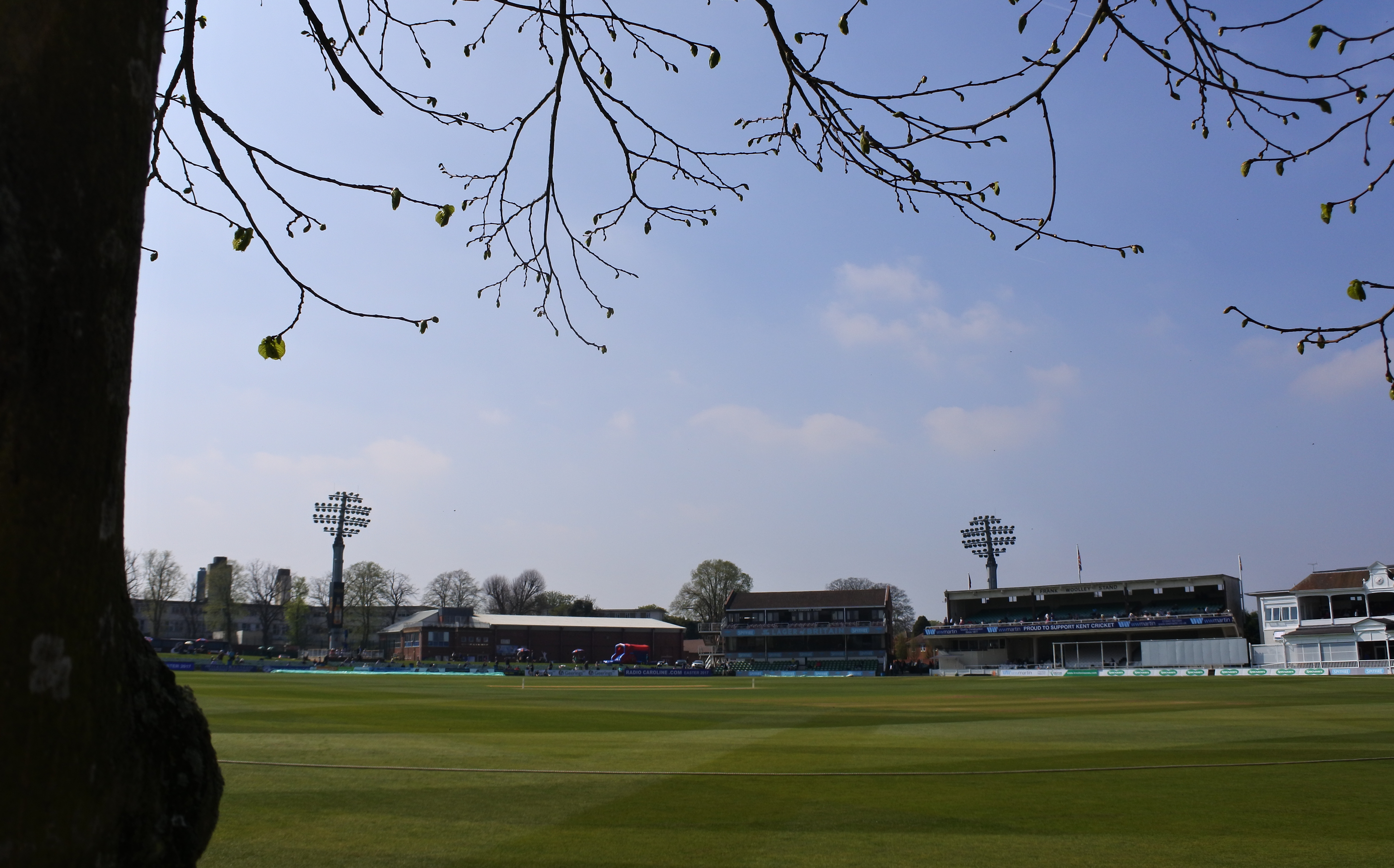
The stands and the replacement lime tree in 2017

The ground includes five stands, four of which are named after famous Kent cricketers. These provide seating for over 2,500 spectators. Outdoor, uncovered seating provides another 3,400 seats.

The Frank Woolley Stand was built in 1927 to replace a wooden structure known as the Telegraph Stand, which had been used for journalists and the scorers. It is a two-tier, cantilevered stand which cost almost £6,000 to build and held almost 1,700 spectators when it was first built. It was one of the largest cantilevered stands in the world when opened, and was known as the Concrete Stand until being renamed to honour Frank Woolley in 1973. Woolley, who played for the county between 1906 and 1938, is the county's leading run scorer and has made the most appearances for the team. He played 64 Test matches for England and was an inaugural member of the ICC Cricket Hall of Fame in 2009. The stand was refurbished in 1972 and in 2012 Kent launched an appeal to raise money to construct a new stand to replace the existing structure.

The Colin Cowdrey Stand was built in the 1980s, partly financed by the sale of mementos after the pollarding of the lime tree that stood on the ground, and formally named after Kent's longest-serving captain during Canterbury Week in 1992. It is a three-storey stand with a conference room, club shop and outside seating for members on the ground floor. The Cornwallis Room, an indoor viewing area with catering facilities named after Stanley Cornwallis who captained the team in the 1920s, is on the first floor and the Harris Room, a function room with outdoor seating used for hospitality purposes and named after Lord Harris, one of the club's most important personalities, is on the second floor.

The Les Ames Stand, closest to the Nackington Road entrance, has no public seating. Since redevelopment it consists of a public bar on the ground-floor level with 16 hospitality boxes and the main scoreboard directly above. The scoreboard, which dates from the 1930s, is one of only two manual scoreboards still in use at any major county ground in England or Wales. (Note: The other manual scoreboard still in operation, as of March 2018, is at Grace Road in Leicester.) The indoor cricket school, which stands behind the Cowdrey Stand, was rebuilt in the early 1990s and opened in 1992, replacing a previous building which had itself been rebuilt in 1976. An extension was added in 1995. It is named after Ames and Hopper Levett, another of Kent's line of wicket-keepers. It includes indoor cricket nets and a sports hall as well as an outdoor astroturf surface and is the base for the Kent Cricket Academy which works with young players across the county. A sports and physiotherapy clinic operates from the same building and provides physiotherapy support to Kent's players.

The Pavilion was built in 1900 on an area of the ground where tents had previously been pitched during Canterbury Week. It is a two-tiered building, originally housing a luncheon room, committee room and changing rooms on the ground floor with seating for spectators on the first-floor and veranda. It is named the Chiesman Pavilion after a major benefactor of the club in the 1960s and 70s. The ground floor contains a large room modelled on the Long Room at Lord's and the upper floor has seating for members. Mobile sightscreens run along the ground floor of the building as well as along the front of the Woolley Stand. The Annexe Stand was built in 1907 adjacent to the Pavilion, and includes seating on two levels. It was originally built as an annexe to the Pavilion for ladies and was renamed the Underwood and Knott Stand in 2011, recognising the bowler–wicket-keeper partnership of Derek Underwood and Alan Knott. The stand contains a press room for journalists on the first floor and the Pavilion includes a radio commentary room. The gap between the two stands was filled in the 1970s by a set of changing rooms. This included an entrance to the field of play for players, who had previously walked through the Pavilion and on to the field through a gate at the front of the building, as at Lord's. The changing rooms were remodelled during redevelopment of the ground in 2010–11 and an extra floor added to the building. Both the Pavilion and the Annexe stands were refurbished at the same time.

During the redevelopment of the ground, a set of offices were built adjacent to the Underwood and Knott Stand. These include a cafe on the ground floor, named after the ground's famous lime tree. The electronic scoreboard, which used to stand on this part of the ground, was moved to the northern team of the ground before being replaced, in 2017, by a new LCD scoreboard on the north-east corner of the ground.

== Memorials ==
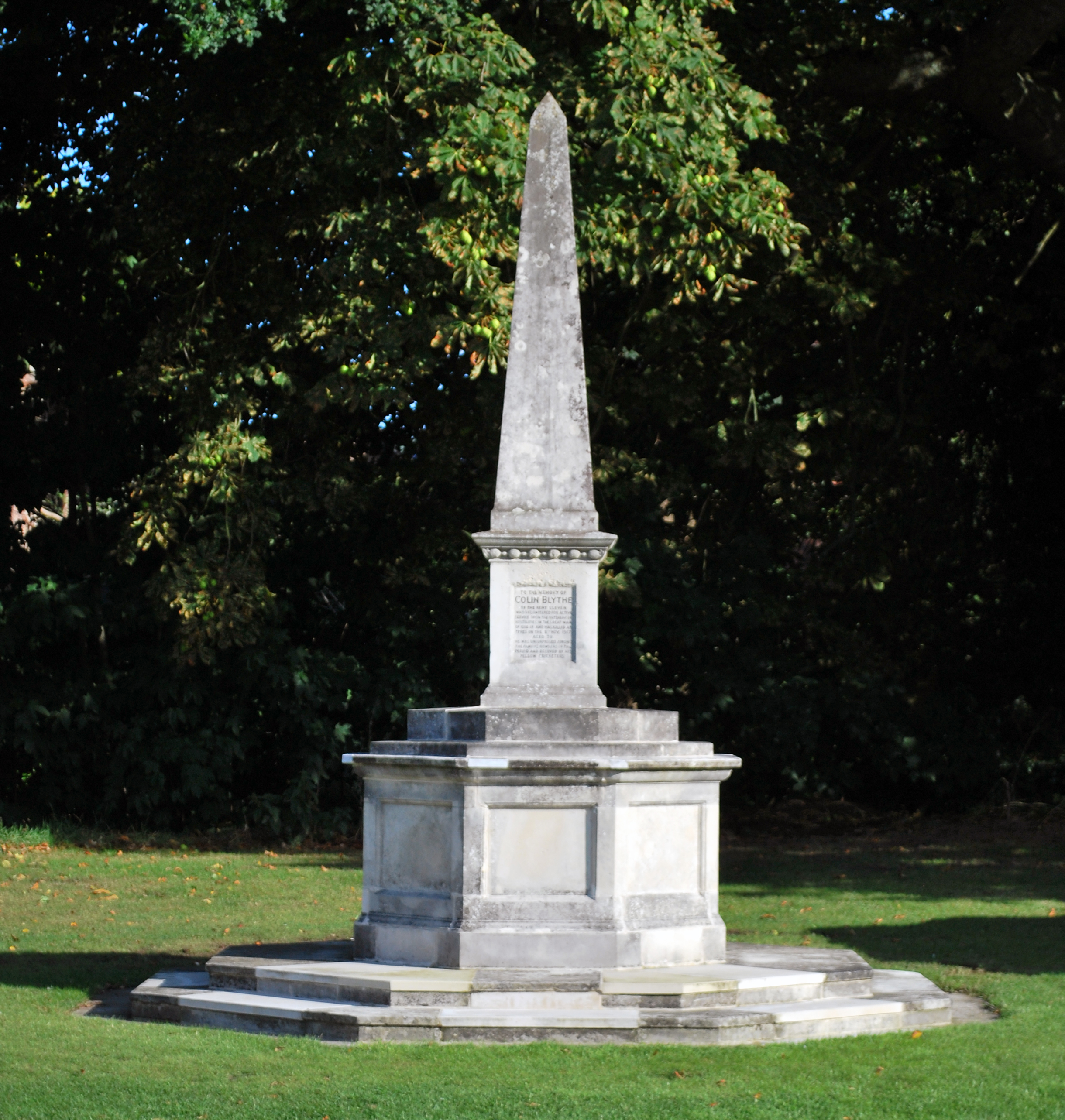
The Blythe Memorial at its new site close to the Nackington Road entrance in 2019

The Blythe Memorial was established on the ground in 1919 in remembrance of Colin Blythe and the other Kent players who had died during World War I. Blythe was Kent's leading bowler during the pre-war period and played Test cricket for England. He was the most high-profile cricketer to die during the war when he was killed, aged 38, near Ypres in October 1917 whilst serving in the Royal Engineers.

The memorial was unveiled in August 1919 and commemorated Blythe and the 12 other Kent cricketers who died during the war. The names of 12 more men were added to it after World War II. It stood at the Old Dover Road entrance to the ground until 2010 when it was removed for safe keeping during redevelopment of the ground. The memorial was rededicated on the centenary of Blythe's death in 2018 on a new site at the Nackington Road entrance behind the Les Ames Stand. Some of Blythe's personal possessions, including two wallets he was carrying when he was killed and which were torn by the shrapnel which killed him, are on display inside the Pavilion on the ground.

A memorial to Fuller Pilch, who established the ground in 1847, was moved from his grave at St Gregory's church in the city to the ground in 1978. The graveyard had fallen into disuse and the memorial was moved to the ground where it stood, near to the Blythe memorial, until redevelopment in 2010 when it was also removed for safe keeping to a stone mason's yard.

The front of the Pavilion features a number of memorial plaques, including a memorial to the members of Band of Brothers, an amateur cricket club closest associated with Kent, who died during World War I and II and the bronze which was used to cast the original Fuller Pilch memorial.

== Ground redevelopment ==
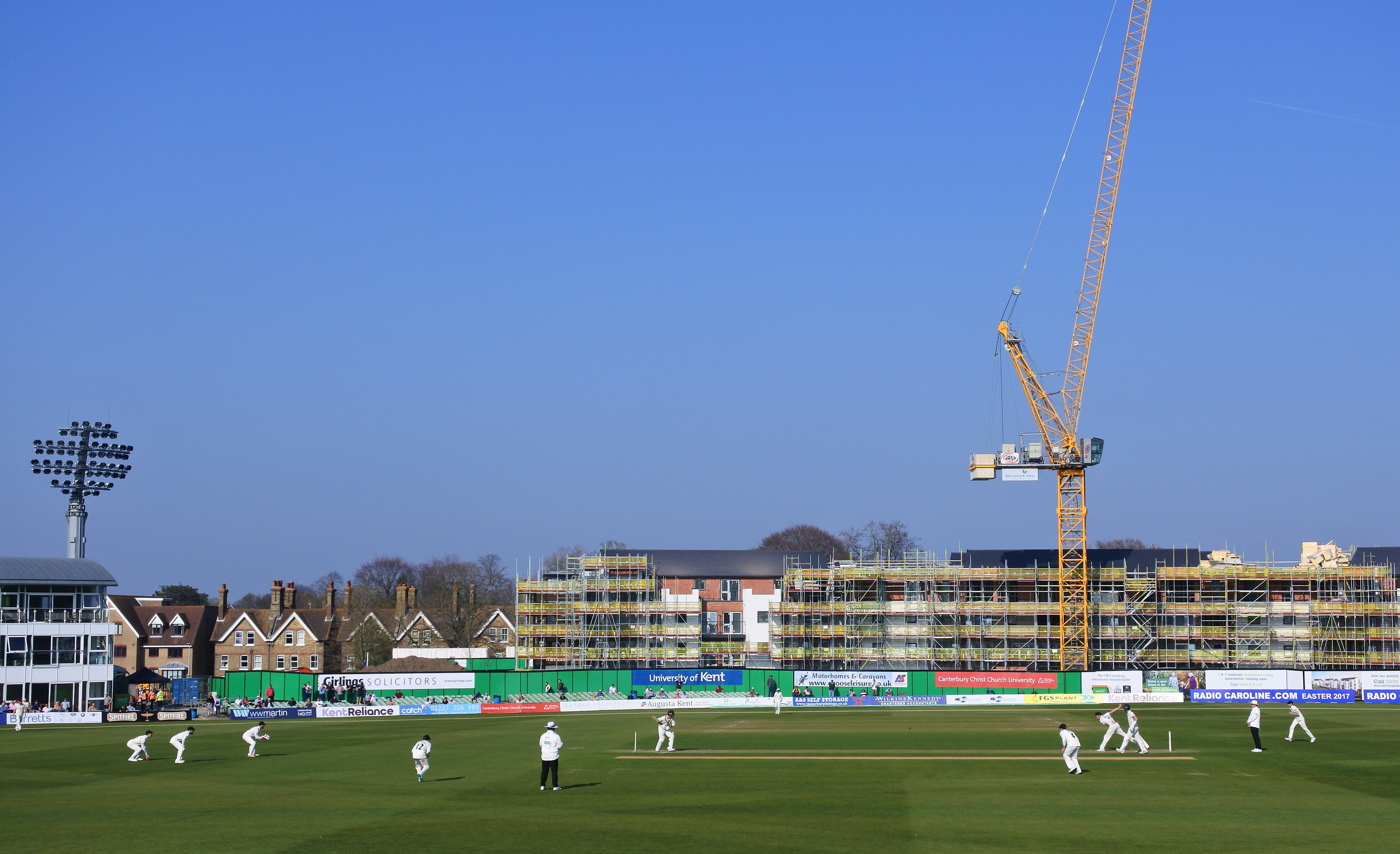
Retirement homes under construction in 2017

The club announced in late 2006 that it would seek to redevelop the ground. The planned £9 million development would include a hotel, health and fitness centre and conference facilities and would have involved the removal of the Les Ames Stand (the former Iron Stand) at the Nackington Road End of the ground, the oldest structure on the ground. The plans involved the upgrading of the pavilion and other stands on the ground. Money for the project would be raised by the building of private housing on the nets behind the pavilion and on the car park of the local pub, the Bat and Ball.

The plans were controversial and the Kent Committee suggested that if they were not approved by the membership of the club that an alternative might be to move the county's headquarters to a ground closer to the M25 in order to attract more spectators. Due to the 2008 financial crisis, the redevelopment plans were put on indefinite "hold" in 2008.

The plans were resurrected in summer 2009 and in March 2010 the club confirmed that Bellway would be its housing partner for the redevelopment project after the financial collapse of Persimmon Homes, the original housing developer. Work started in September 2010 on developing the ground. Five permanent, retractable floodlight masts were installed in the 2010–11 off-season and the dressing rooms were refurbished and redeveloped. The floodlights replaced temporary lights which had proved unreliable in strong winds and had restricted the county's ability to play evening Twenty20 matches.

Land behind the Pavilion was sold to Bellway in 2011 and in March 2012 a new Sainsbury's Local convenience store opened. This faces out of the ground and occupies the ground floor of the new club administration building alongside the Lime Tree Cafe inside the ground. The building was partly funded by a loan from Canterbury City Council.

In 2013, the club announced they had been unable to find a partner for the hotel and fitness centre and instead hoped to build 60 retirement flats on the northern team of the ground. Canterbury City Council initially rejected the planning application in late 2014, but the decision was overturned and construction began in 2016 and was completed by the start of the 2018 season. The new plans were restricted to the northern edge of the ground along the Old Dover Road and ensured that the Les Ames Stand was retained on the ground. The development was opened in 2017 and named Freeman House in honour of Kent's leading wicket-taker, Tich Freeman. At the same time, a new electronic scoreboard was installed near to the apartments.

== Transport ==
The ground is located 1 mile (1.6 km) south-east of the centre of Canterbury on the B2068 Old Dover Road. The Nackington Road runs along the eastern edge of the ground. It is 1 mile (1.6 km) from Canterbury East railway station on the London Victoria to Dover line. Canterbury West railway station, on the other team of the city centre, is 1.5 miles (2.4 km) away and is on the London Charing Cross to Ramsgate line and High Speed 1 from London St Pancras to Margate.

Although it remains possible to park cars on the boundary edge, redevelopment has restricted the number that can be driven onto the ground and parking is now restricted to car-parking season-ticket holders, with a small number of parking spaces reserved for disabled drivers. Car parking is available for some days at Simon Langton Girls' Grammar School, which is adjacent to the ground on the Nackington Road team, while Canterbury City Council's large Old Dover Road park-and-ride facility is within a 10–15 minutes' walk from the ground. Canterbury Park and Ride buses stop immediately outside the ground on their way into the city, and other local bus services serve the ground either from outside it or on the A2050 New Dover Road 200 metres (220 yd) from the entrance to the ground.

== Other uses ==
The ground has been used for a number of music concerts, beginning with Elton John who appeared at the ground in 2006. In recent years, concerts, which take place during the summer using a temporary stage at the Nackington Road end of the ground, have featured artists such as Madness, Olly Murs, Bryan Adams, Tom Jones and Michael Bublé. It has been used as a venue for the Canterbury Festival, an arts festival held in the city each autumn, hosting the Spiegeltent. Rooms at the ground can be hired for a number of purposes and the cafe and cricket shop are open throughout the year.

A fireworks display is held at the ground annually around Guy Fawkes Night.

== Records on the ground ==
Over 600 first-class and 350 List A matches have been played on the ground.

All records last updated 2 July 2025

=== First-class cricket ===
- Highest total: 722/6 declared by Northants against Kent, 2025
- Lowest total: 30 by Gentlemen of England against Gentlemen of Kent, 1859
- Highest partnership: 423 unbroken, 2nd wicket by JM Cox and JA Leaning, for Kent against Sussex, 2020 (Note: The unbroken partnership between Cox and Leaning was made during the 2020 Bob Willis Trophy competition during which teams batting in their first innings were limited to 120 overs.)
- Highest individual score: 344, WG Grace for Gentlemen of the MCC against Kent, 1876
- Best bowling in an innings: 10/69, EM Grace for Gentlemen of the MCC against Kent, 1862
- Best bowling in a match: 18/96, H Arkwright for Gentlemen of the MCC against Gentlemen of Kent, 1861

=== List A cricket ===
- Highest total: 425/1 by England Lions against Sri Lanka A, 2016
- Lowest total: 60 by Derbyshire against Kent, 2008
- Highest partnership: 367, 2nd wicket by DJ Bell-Drummond and BM Duckett for England Lions against Sri Lanka A, 2016
- Highest individual score: 220 not out, BM Duckett for England Lions against Sri Lanka A, 2016
- Best bowling: 6/17, AJ Hollioake for Surrey against Kent, 2003

=== Twenty20 cricket ===
- Highest total: 250/6 by Surrey against Kent, 2018
- Lowest total: 93 by Durham against Kent, 2009
- Highest partnership: 169, 1st wicket by T Banton and DP Conway for Somerset against Kent, 2021
- Highest individual score: 129, DT Christian for Middlesex against Kent, 2014
- Best bowling: 5/21, Imran Qayyum for Kent against Somerset, 2019

== See also ==
- List of Kent County Cricket Club grounds

== Bibliography ==
- Birley, Derek (1999). A Social History of English Cricket. London: Aurum Press. ISBN 978-18-54107-10-7 – via Internet Archive.
- Carlaw, Derek (2020). Kent County Cricketers, A to Z: Part One (1806–1914) (PDF). Cardiff: ACS.
- Lewis, Paul (2014). For Kent and Country. Eastbourne: Reveille Press. ISBN 978-19-08336-63-7.
