= Francis Mellersh =

Francis Mellersh may refer to:

- Francis Mellersh (cricketer) (1786–1849), English cricketer
- Francis Mellersh (RAF officer) (1898–1955), World War I fighter ace and later Air Vice Marshal
- Francis Richard Lee Mellersh, British World War II fighter ace, later Air Vice Marshal, son of the above
