= Cricket Pavilion =

Cricket Pavilion may refer to:

- cricket pavilion, a pavilion at a cricket ground.
- Cricket Wireless Pavilion, an amphitheater located in Phoenix, Arizona; name commonly shortened to just "Cricket Pavilion"
