= Lord's Pavilion =

Grade II* listed cricket pavilion in London

Coordinates: 51.5290°N 0.1739°W

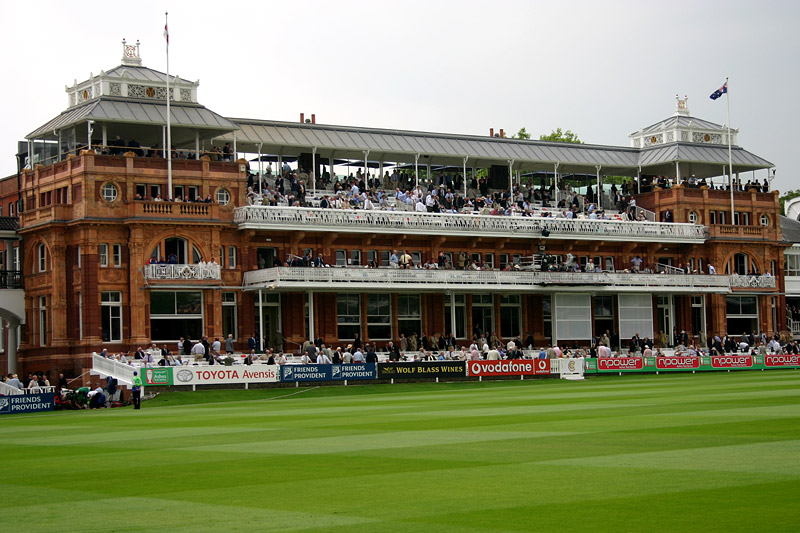
Lord's Pavilion contains the two teams' dressing rooms at either end of the middle tier each with a white-balustraded balcony.

Lord's Pavilion is a cricket pavilion at Lord's Cricket Ground at St John's Wood, historically in Middlesex and now in the City of Westminster, London NW8.

Designed by Thomas Verity, Lord's Pavilion is a Victorian Grade II* listed building. Owned by MCC, Lord's Cricket Ground has been dubbed the Home of Cricket and serves as Middlesex County Cricket Club's home ground as well as hosting England international cricket matches.

== History ==
The present Lord's Pavilion was opened in 1890 by MCC President, Lord Willoughby de Eresby, having been built at a cost of £21,000 after the previous pavilion had been destroyed by fire.

Only one batter, Albert Trott in 1889, has ever hit a ball over the top of Lord's Pavilion. The now-defunct magazine Cricket Lore offered a prize of £10,000 for several seasons to anyone repeating the feat, but the prize went unclaimed. In 2010, Somerset County Cricket Club captain Marcus Trescothick was reportedly offered £1 million to hit a six over the Pavilion.

Until 1999 ladies – with the exception of Club Patron Queen Elizabeth II – were not permitted to enter the Pavilion during play, due to MCC's longstanding gender-based membership policy. Diana Edulji, who captained India's 1986 tour of England, was refused entry to Lord's Pavilion quipping that MCC should change its name to MCP ("male chauvinist pigs"). MCC's 1998 decision to admit female members represented a historic modernisation for Lord's Pavilion and similar clubs.

Closed for major refurbishment in 2004, costing £8.2 million, the Pavilion's seating was upgraded throughout, including the upper tiers, as well as the redecorating of its iconic historic areas, such as the Long Room.

On Day 5 of the Second 2023 Ashes Test, Jonny Bairstow's stumping by Alex Carey prompted some to accuse the Australians of failing to uphold the Spirit of Cricket.
An altercation ensued in the Long Room with Usman Khawaja and David Warner exchanging heated words with some MCC members, before being ushered away by Lord's stewards. The MCC issued an “unreservedly apology” to the Australian team, expelling one member and suspending two others following an investigation.

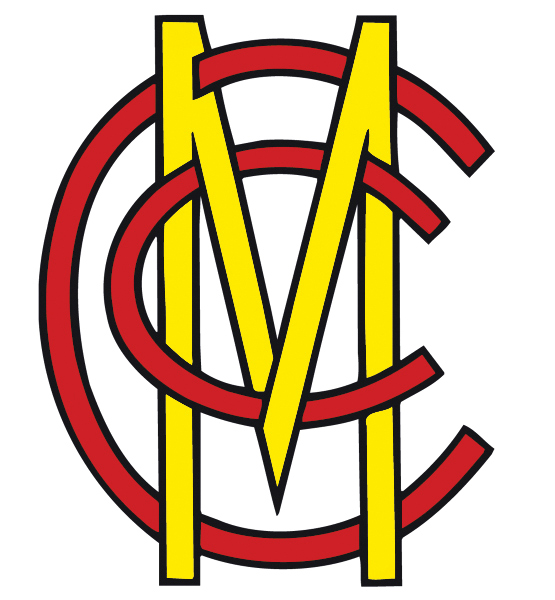
MCC logo

== Regulations ==
The dress code in Lord's Pavilion remains notoriously strict. Men are required to wear "ties and tailored coats and acceptable trousers with appropriate shoes" and women are required to wear "dresses; or skirts or trousers worn with blouses, and appropriate shoes".

== Features ==
=== Dressing rooms ===
Lord's Pavilion houses dressing rooms designated for home and away teams. Each has its own balcony for players and fellow squad members to watch the cricket.

=== Honours boards ===
If a player scores a century or takes five wickets in a Test match innings, their name is engraved on the relevant Lord's honours board, located in the dressing rooms. England players' statistics are recorded on boards in the home dressing room and those of overseas internationals in the away dressing room.

Among other celebrated Test cricketers, Shane Warne, Sachin Tendulkar, Ricky Ponting, Brian Lara and Curtly Ambrose, never qualified for inclusion on Lord's honours boards.

=== Long Room ===
The Long Room, situated on the ground floor, forms the heart of Lord's Pavilion.

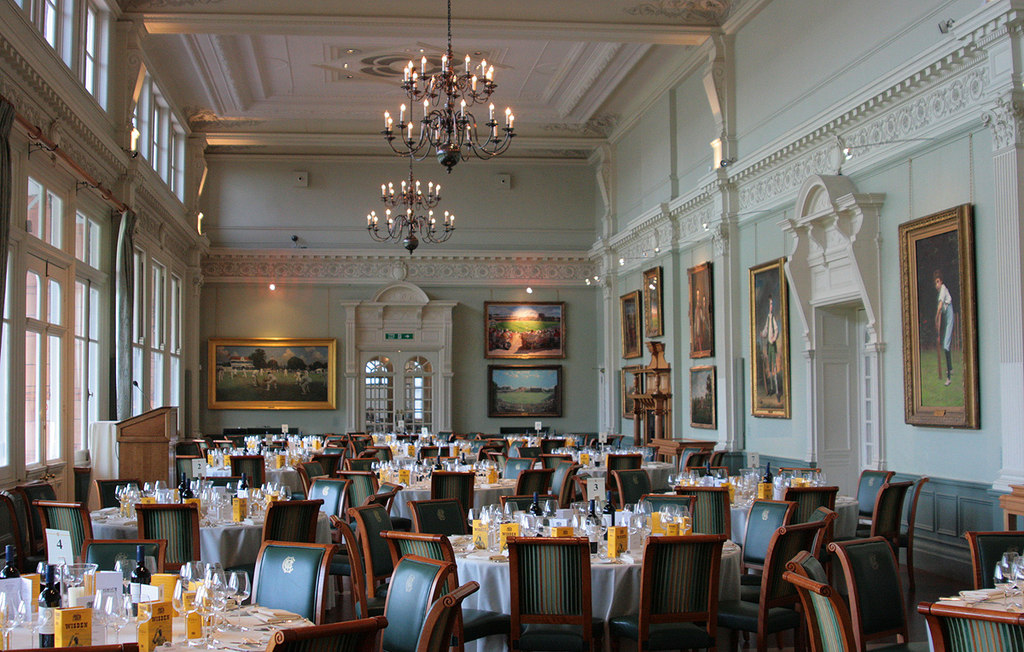
The Long Room at Lord's

Described as "the most evocative four walls in world cricket", at Lord's players must make their way from the dressing room through the Long Room before entering the middle (playing area) & vice versa. The epoxy-screed route can seem daunting as it involves negotiating flights of stairs and steps; on his Test debut in 1975, David Steele got lost "and ended up in the Pavilion's basement toilets" (before hitting a half-century to bail England out).

Members of MCC can mingle freely in the Long Room (observing the cricket through its large windows) on match days, customarily greeting visiting overseas and especially Australian batsmen on their way out to bat with "witticisms ... like See you soon"! Australian Test cricketer Justin Langer describes walking through the Long Room akin to "being bearhugged by an invisible spirit".

Adorned with some of the MCC's finest paintings of famous cricket scenes as well as celebrated cricket players and administrators from the 18th century to the present day, the Long Room was inspired by the tradition of long galleries built for British stately homes.

=== Sightscreens ===
Lord's Pavilion provides four movable sightscreens on wheels, enabling batters to request their adjustment according to any change in bowling action.

== See also ==
- Marylebone Cricket Club
