= St Lawrence Lime =

Tree at St Lawrence cricket ground

Coordinates: 51.26758°N 1.09279°E

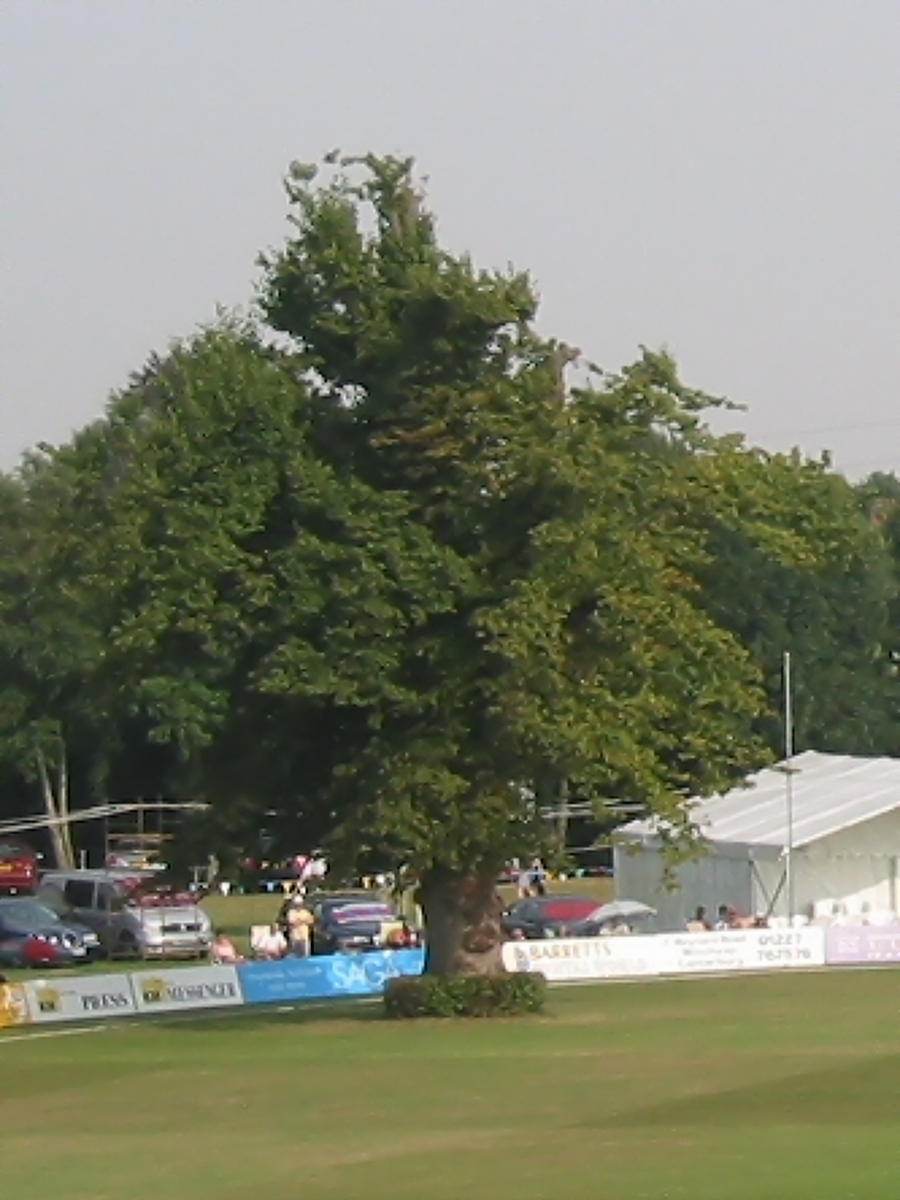
- The St Lawrence Lime in 2003
- Interactive map of St Lawrence Lime
- Species: Lime tree
- Location: St Lawrence Ground, Canterbury, Kent, England
- Height: 27 m (89 ft)
- Date felled: 8 January 2005

The St Lawrence Lime Tree was a 27-metre-high lime tree (90 ft) at the St Lawrence Ground in Canterbury, Kent, England. It was located within the boundary ropes of the cricket field which required special rules. In 2005, it was broken in two during high winds.

== History ==
It is not known when the tree was planted, but it was fully grown by 1847, when the St Lawrence Ground was opened. The cricket ground was built around the tree, which was located within the boundary ropes. As a result of the St Lawrence Ground being the only first-class ground with a tree in the playing area, special laws were enacted regarding the tree. These laws may have been instigated pre-1910 where a Hampshire County Cricket Club batsman was claimed to be caught by a Kent County Cricket Club fielder off the tree. The laws stated that if the ball hit the tree, it was scored as a four even if it would have gone on to score six otherwise and no batsman could be caught out from a rebound off the tree. It was viewed as a challenge to hit a ball over the tree; only four batsmen, Arthur Watson, Learie Constantine, Jim Smith and Carl Hooper, managed it.

=== Death and replacement ===
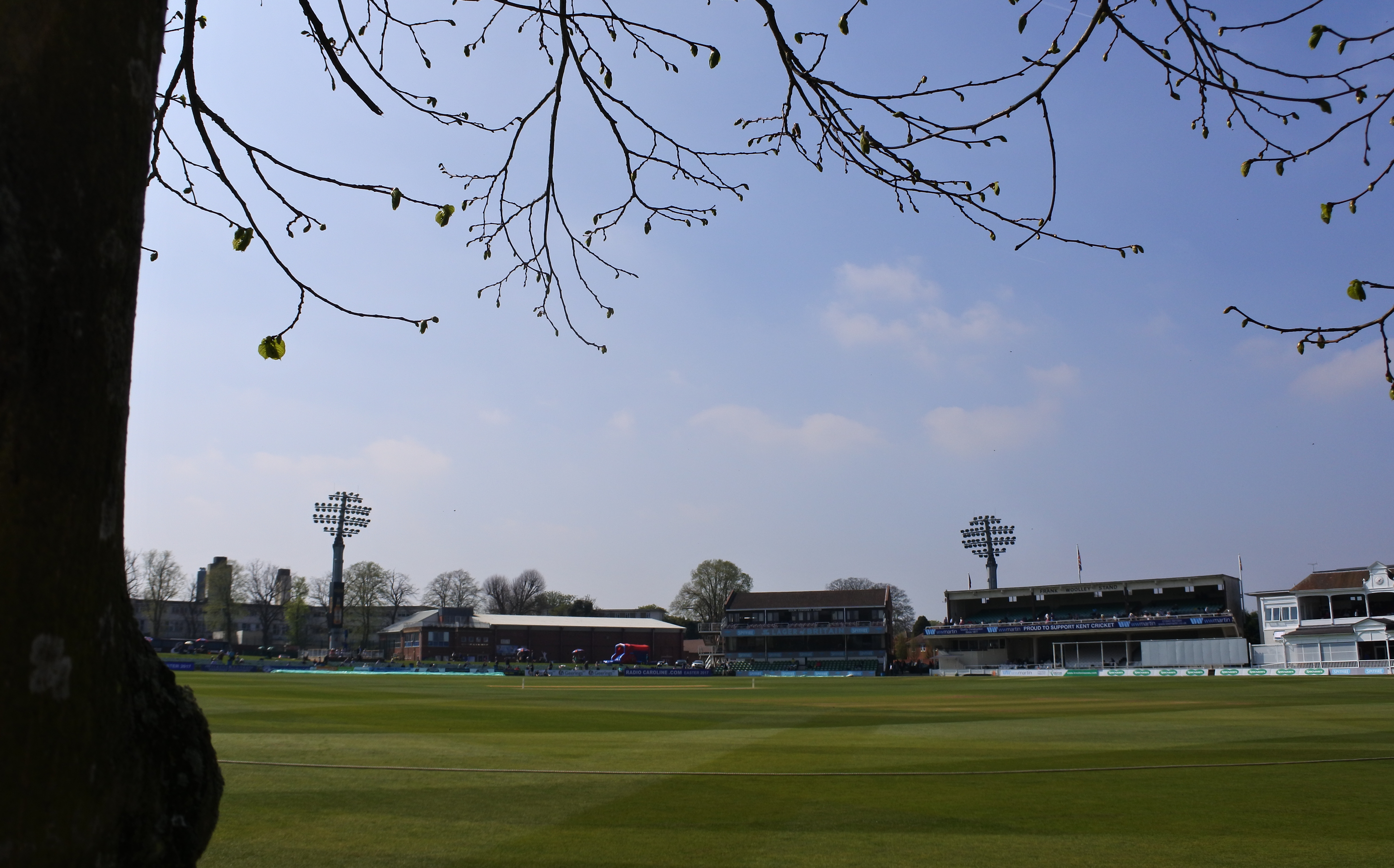
The replacement St Lawrence Lime in 2017

In 1999, the St Lawrence Lime was diagnosed with heartwood fungus and given an expected lifespan of 10 years despite pollarding aimed to promote growth. In preparation, a replacement Tilia sapling was planted at the St Lawrence Ground by E. W. Swanton. Weakened by the fungus, the trunk of the tree was broken in two by high winds on 8 January 2005, leaving a 2.1 m (7 ft) stump. Kent initially planned to use the replacement to take the place of the St Lawrence Lime and had permission from the Marylebone Cricket Club to do so. However, because the replacement was still small and was deemed unable to take a cricket ball and being less visible to players, it was planted in the playing area outside the boundary ropes instead of inside to take the place of the St Lawrence Lime in a ceremony including former club captain Chris Cowdrey.
