= James Rice (cricketer) =

English cricketer

James Rice (dates unknown) was an English amateur cricketer during the Napoleonic Wars.

== Career ==
Rice made 3 known appearances from 1811 to 1813. He is not known to have been attached to any particular club although, as an amateur who played all his games at Lord's Middle Ground, it is possible he was a member of Marylebone Cricket Club (MCC), which was based at that venue.

The matches in which Rice appeared were the only fixtures of the three seasons in question. Cricket at this time had been badly impacted by a loss of both investment and manpower caused by the Napoleonic Wars. The matches were also the only important matches recorded on Lord's Middle Ground so Rice played his entire career at that ground.

== External sources ==
- CricketArchive record
