= Lord's slope =

Slope of the cricket pitch at Lord's Cricket Ground, London

Coordinates: 51.530°N 0.172°W

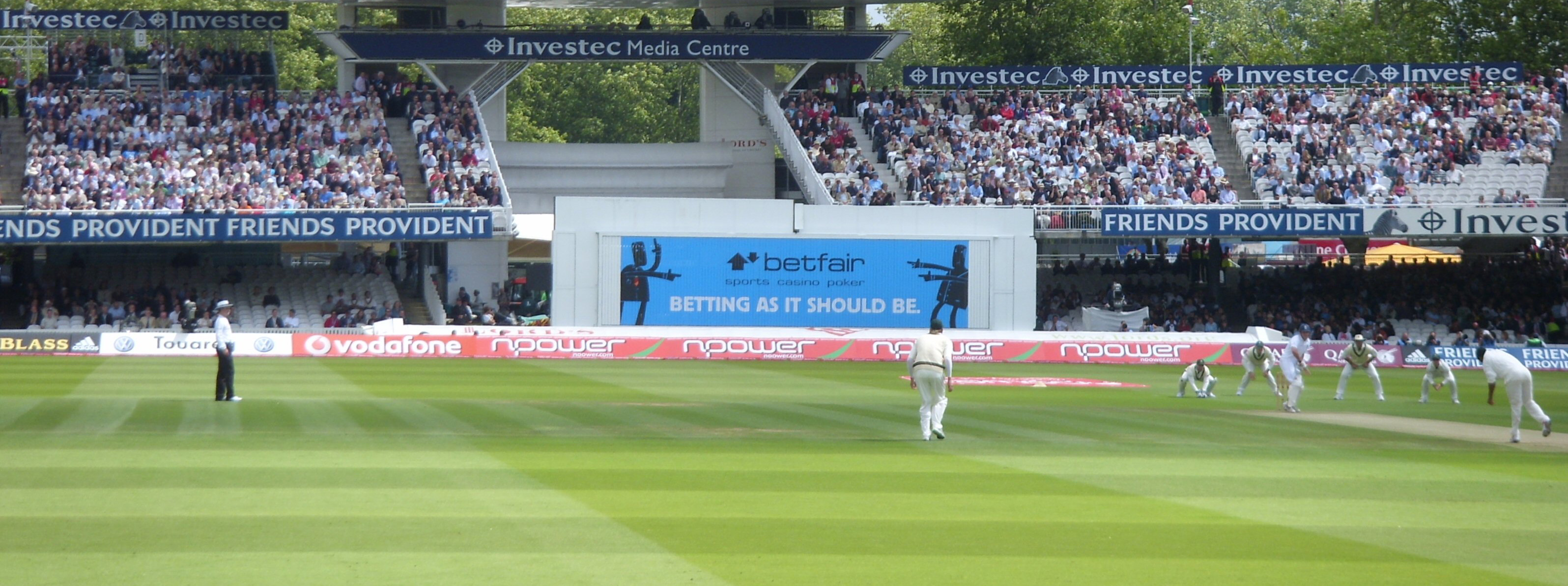
The Lord's slope

The Lord's slope is a geographical gradient at Lord's Cricket Ground in London, England. The slope is in the cricket pitch and runs from the north end of the ground to the south end with a drop of 2.5 metres (8 ft 2 in).

== History ==
Lord's, located in St John's Wood, was opened in 1814 on land which included both a duck pond and a pronounced slope. The ground was built around the slope, and eventually enclosed by stands. The slope runs diagonally across the field from north to south, with a drop of around 8 ft 2 in (2.49 m).

In the 21st century, there were calls for the slope to be levelled as a result of the advent of drop-in pitches. Smaller ridges in the pitch had previously been removed by surveyors. However, the Marylebone Cricket Club rejected these calls stating that removal of the slope would require rebuilding of Lord's and would mean that the ground would be unable to host Test cricket for five years as the new square would need time to mature after the levelling. In 2002, the Lord's outfield was replaced and drainage installed. During this work, several small deviations in the pitches were removed, but the slope remained.

During the 2012 Summer Olympics, when Lord's hosted the Archery tournament, there were suggestions that the slope would affect the archers. However, British archer Alison Williamson rejected this, stating that the slope was barely noticeable.

== Cricket ==
The Lord's slope is often used to advantage by bowlers in cricket matches at Lord's. Because of the slope's angles, seam bowlers from the Pavilion End and swing bowlers from the Nursery End gain an advantage as the natural variation of the slope alters the bounce of the ball when bowling. The gradient of the slope is noted to affect right-handed batsmen more than left-handed batsmen as the ball naturally moves towards left-handed batsmen. Despite the advantages the slope gives to bowlers, some batsmen consistently make high scores when playing at Lord's.
