= Cricket pavilion =

Building at a cricket ground

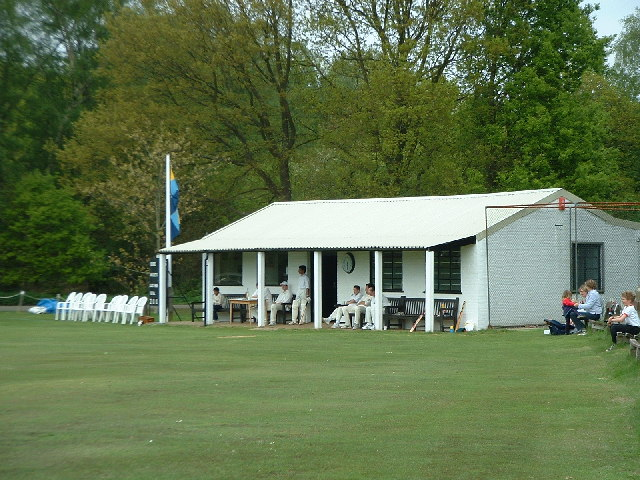
The pavilion at Headley, Surrey, typical of the modest buildings found at English village cricket grounds.

A cricket pavilion is a pavilion at a cricket ground. It is the main building within which the players usually change in dressing rooms and which is the main location for watching the cricket match for members and others. Pavilions can vary from modest and purely practical buildings at small venues to large and imposing edifices at some of the historic grounds where Test cricket is played.

== Historic pavilions ==
The pavilions at Lord's Cricket Ground and The Oval are typical of the Victorian architectural style often seen at most famous English grounds. The cricket pavilion in the University Parks at Oxford was designed by the leading Victorian architect Sir Thomas Graham Jackson. Other famous historical pavilions are Old Trafford and the Members Pavilion at the Sydney Cricket Ground. Entry is only enabled for members. Their seats are reserved by a member or player. A non-member is not entitled to enter the Members Pavilion.

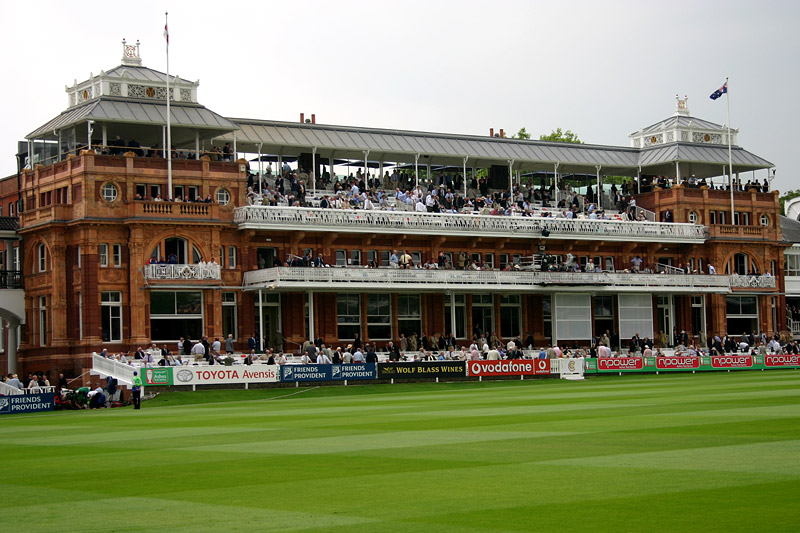
The pavilion at Lord's Cricket Ground, London

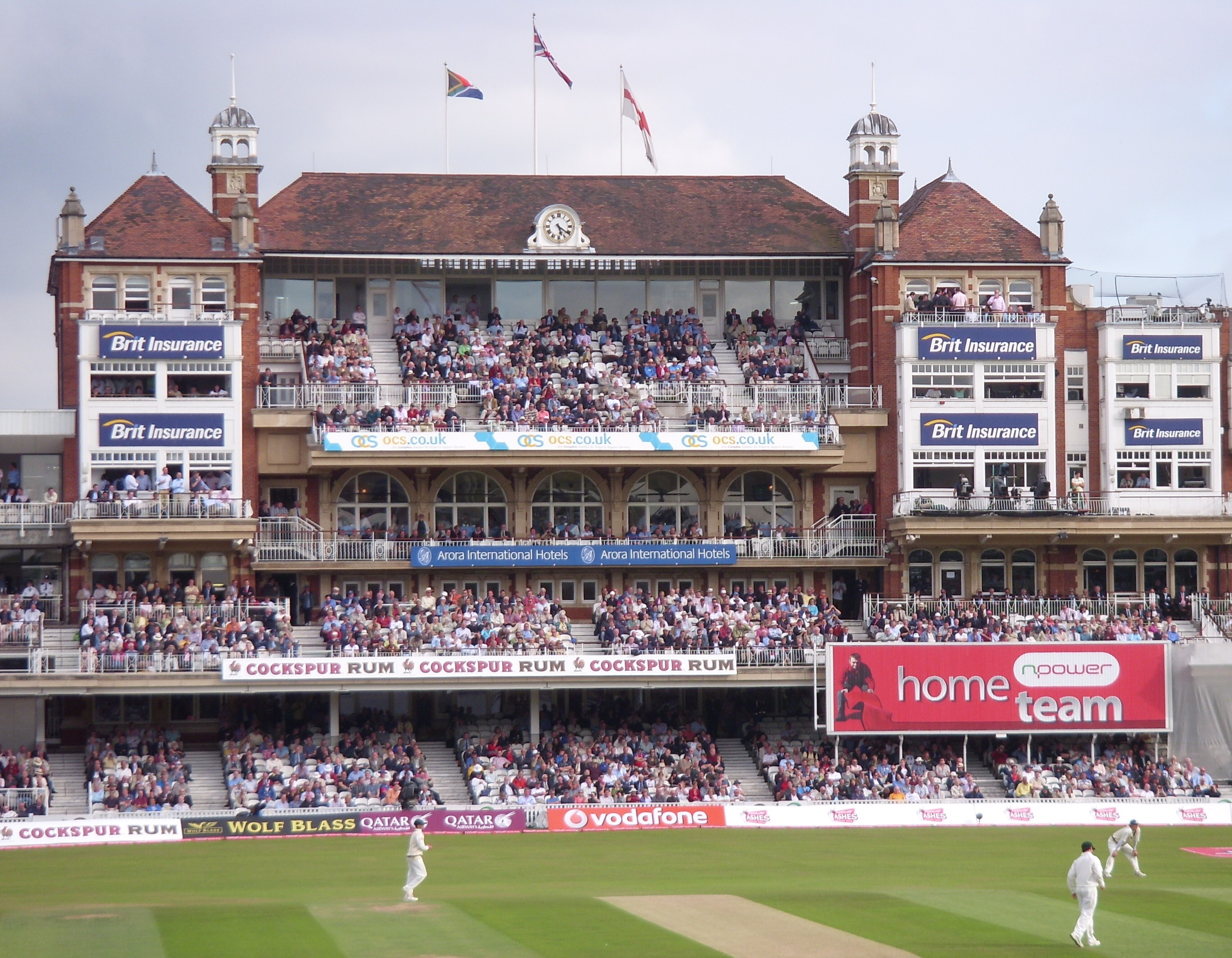
The Victorian pavilion at The Oval, London

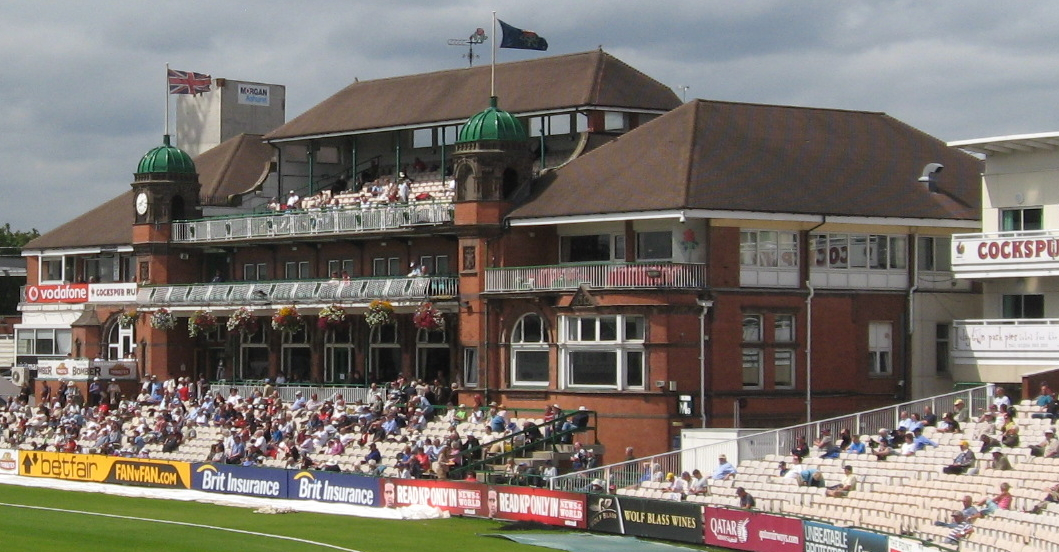
The pavilion at Old Trafford Cricket Ground, Manchester

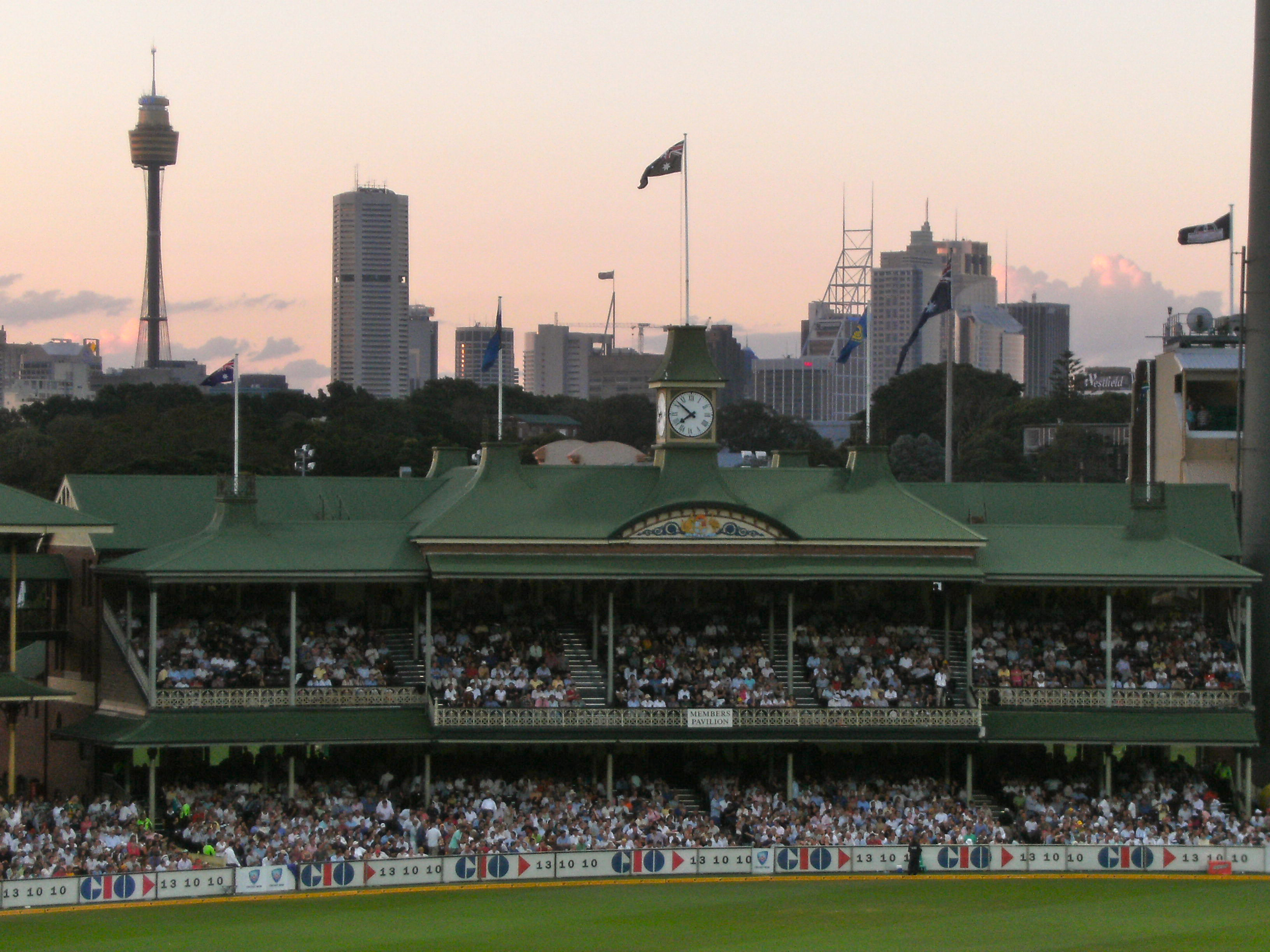
The historic Members Pavilion at the Sydney Cricket Ground, Sydney

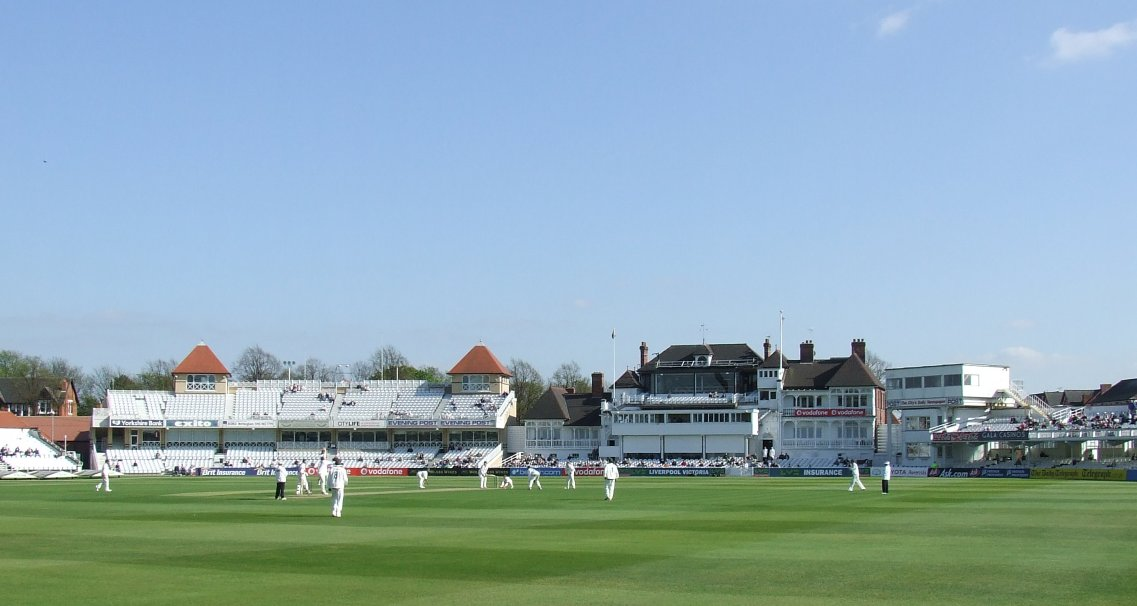
The pavilion (right of centre) at Trent Bridge, Nottingham

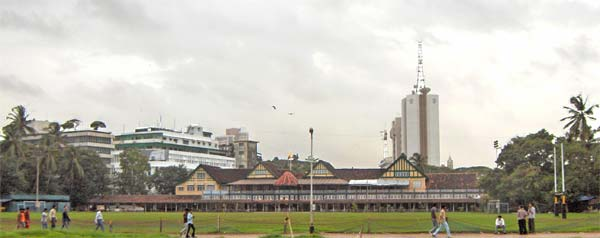
Bombay Gymkhana pavilion, Mumbai

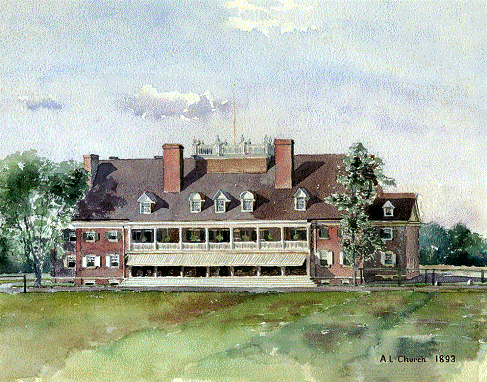
Germantown Cricket Club pavilion, Philadelphia, United States

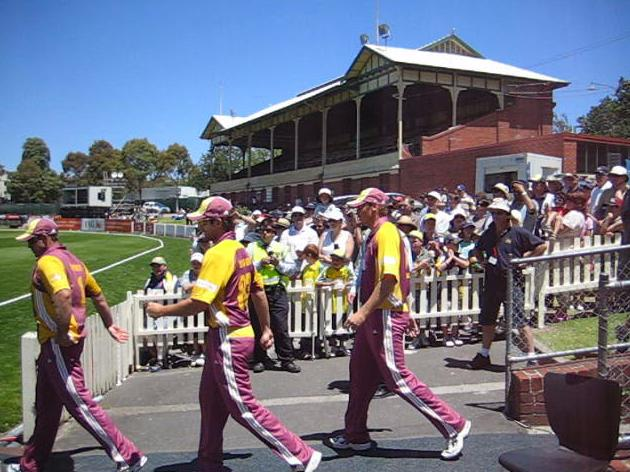
Junction Oval pavilion, Melbourne

== Modern pavilions ==
Amongst the most distinctive of modern pavilions is that named after Sir Garfield Sobers at the Kensington Oval in Barbados. Other modern pavilions are those at the Rose Bowl in England and the Brabourne Stadium in India.

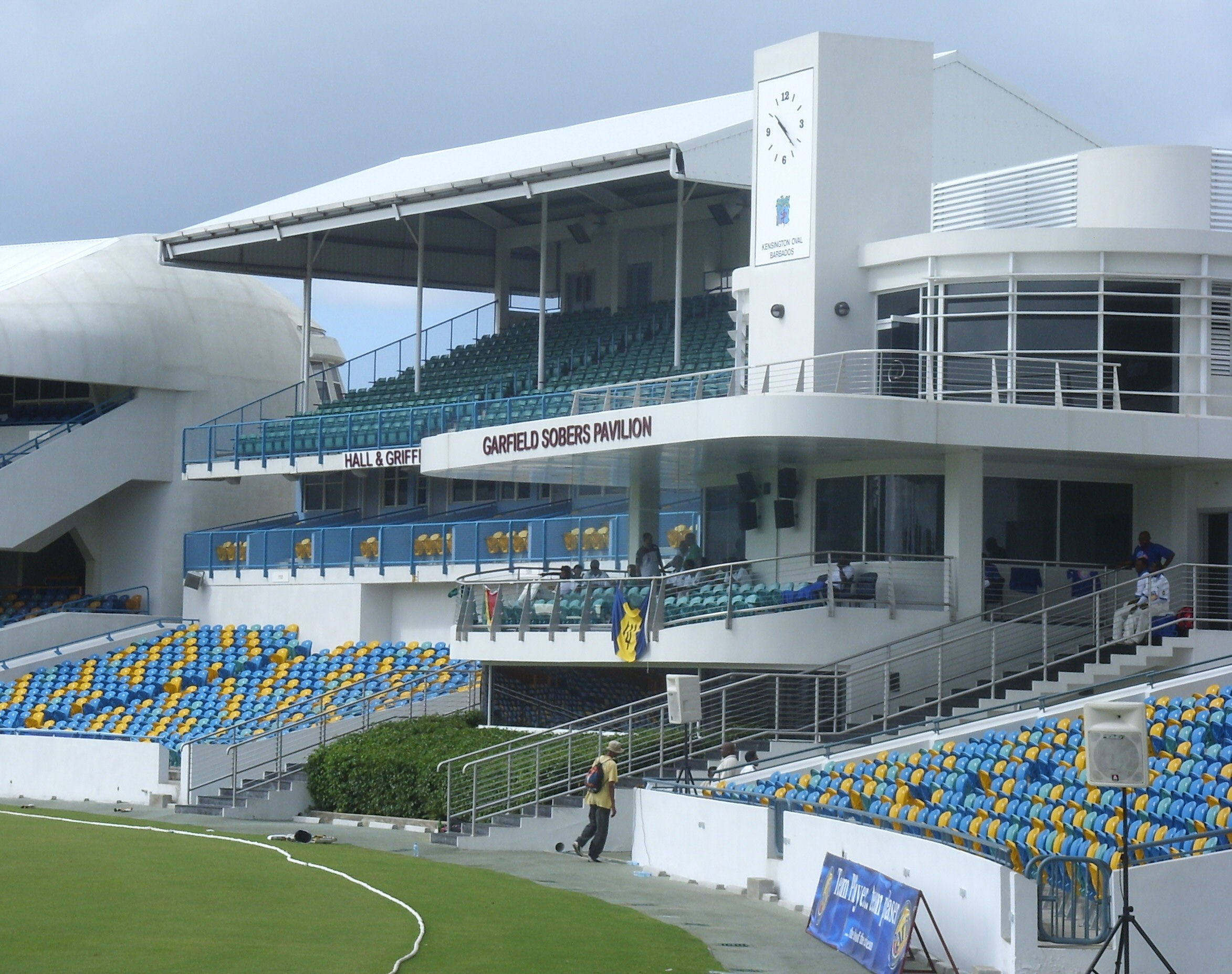
The Sir Garfield Sobers pavilion at Kensington Oval, Barbados

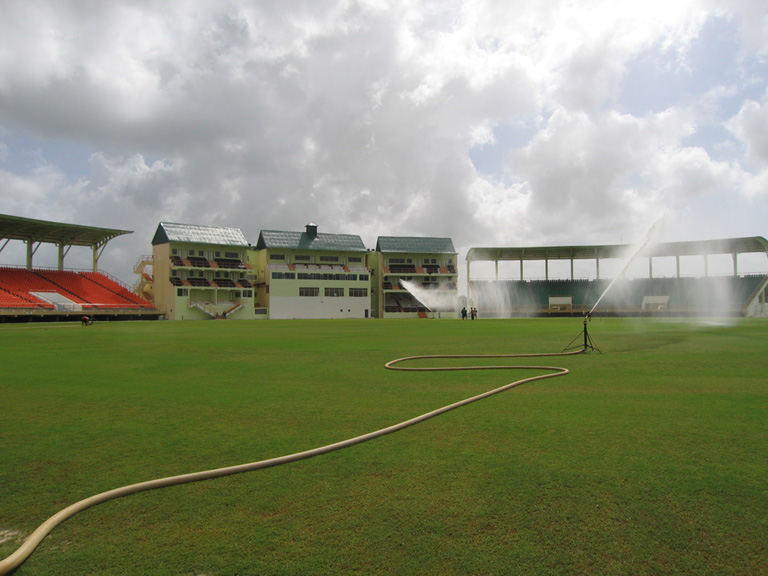
Providence Stadium pavilion, Guyana

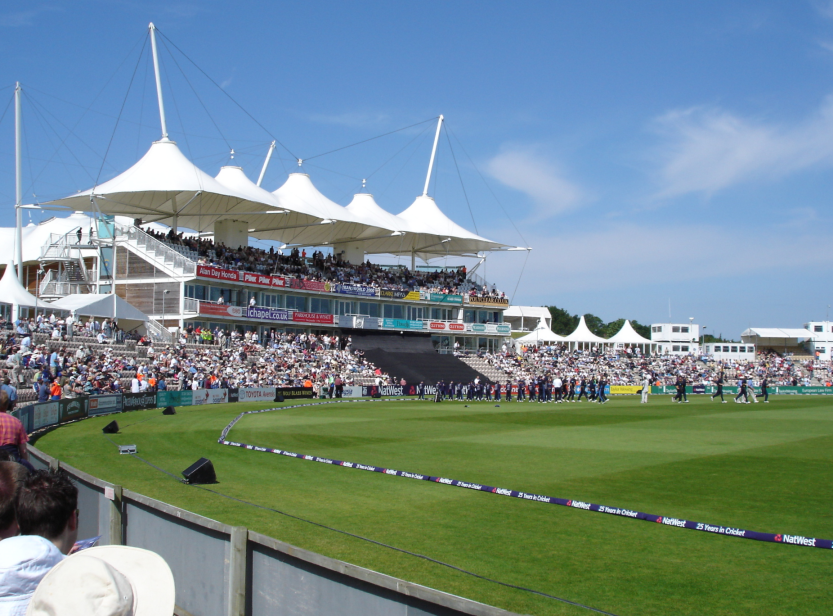
The Rose Bowl pavilion, Southampton

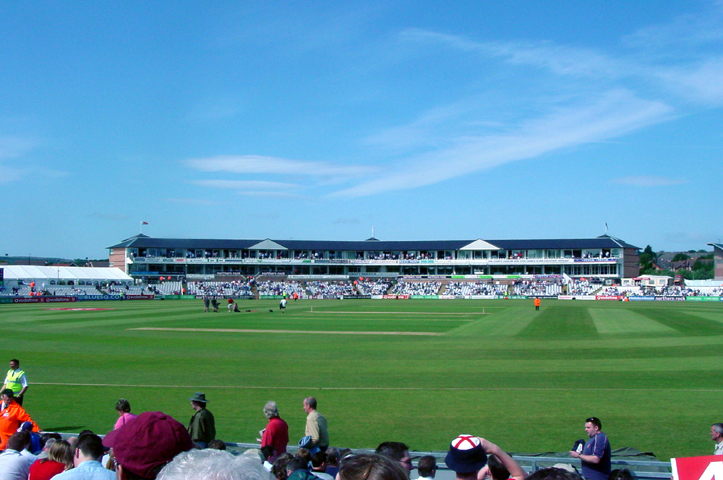
Riverside Ground, Chester-le-Street

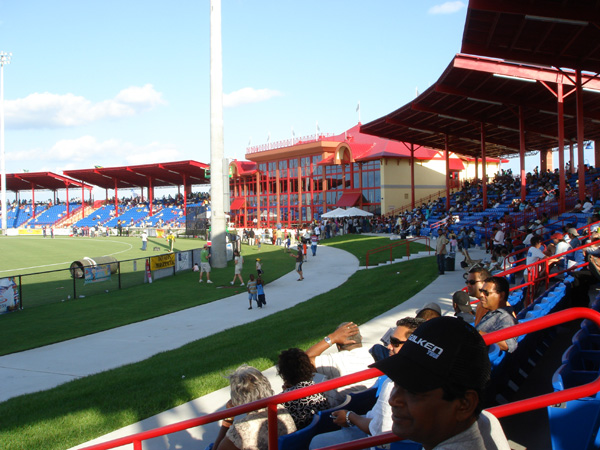
Central Broward Regional Park pavilion, Lauderhill, Florida

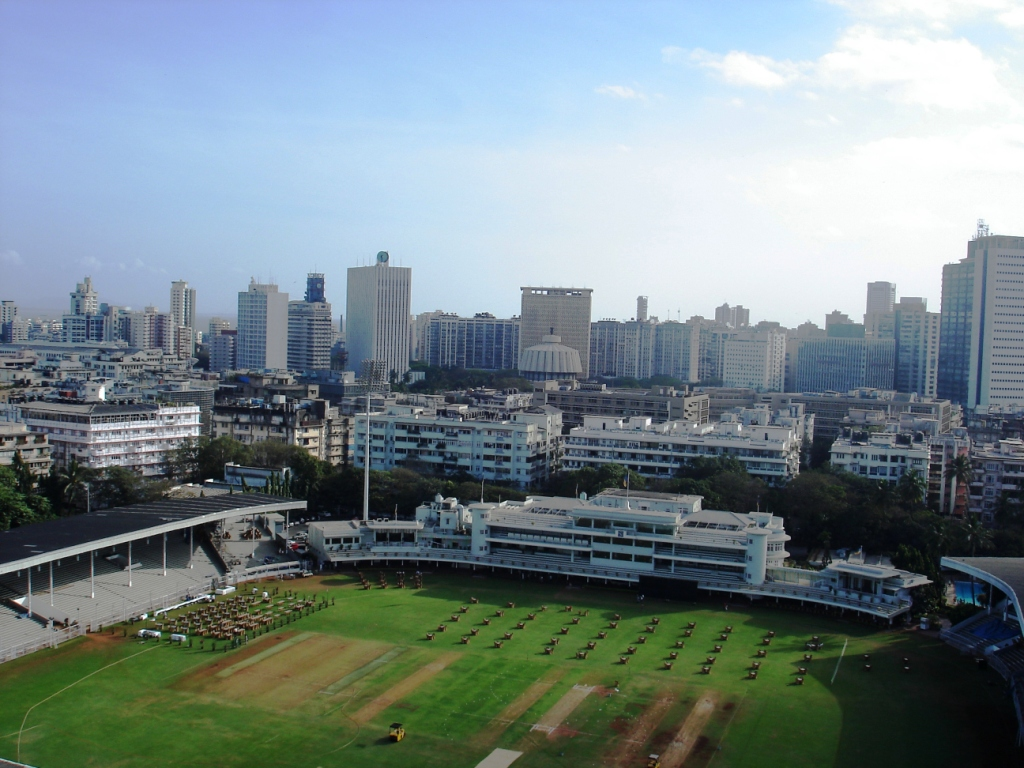
Brabourne Stadium pavilion, Mumbai

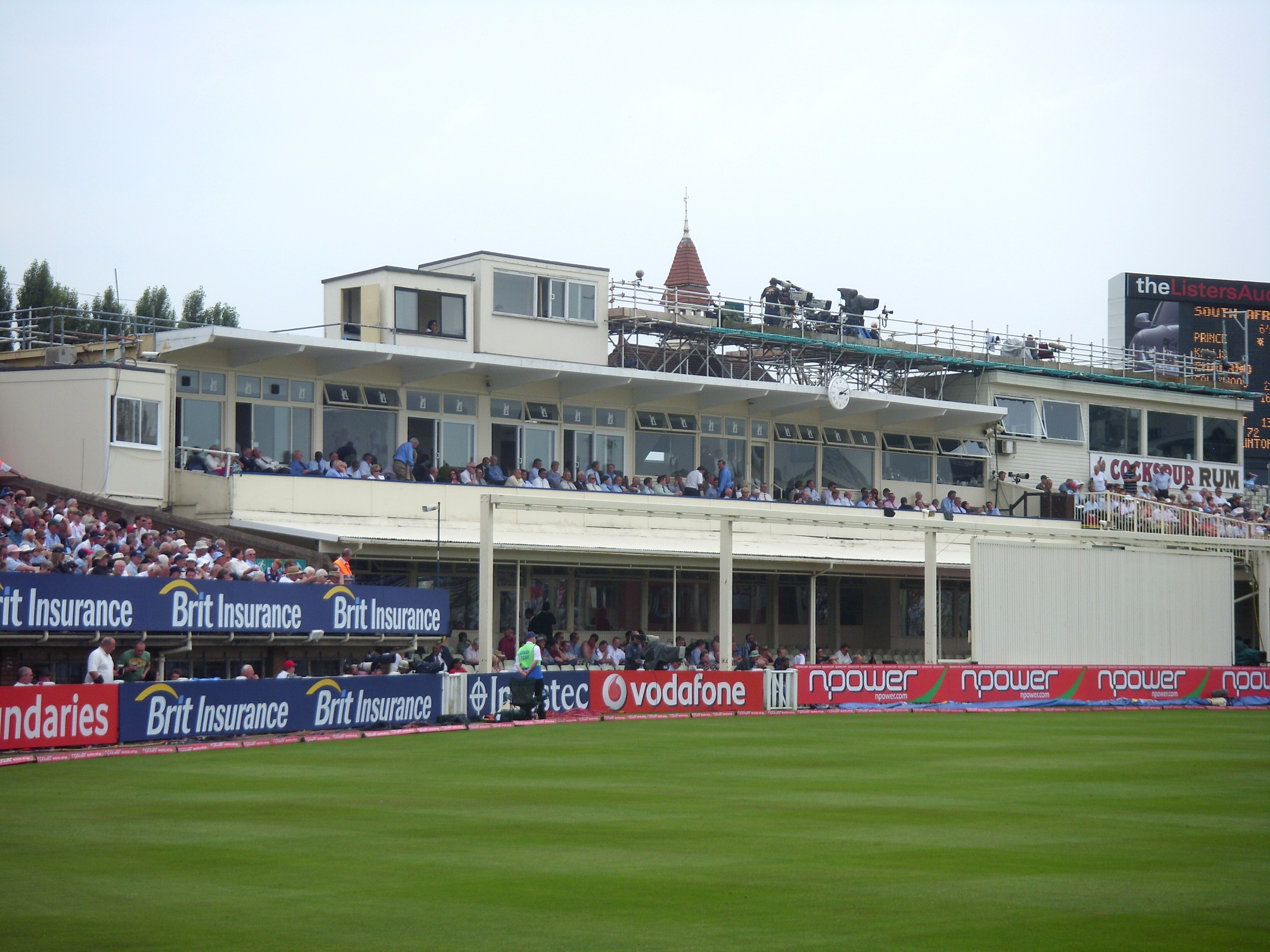
Edgbaston Cricket Ground pavilion, Birmingham

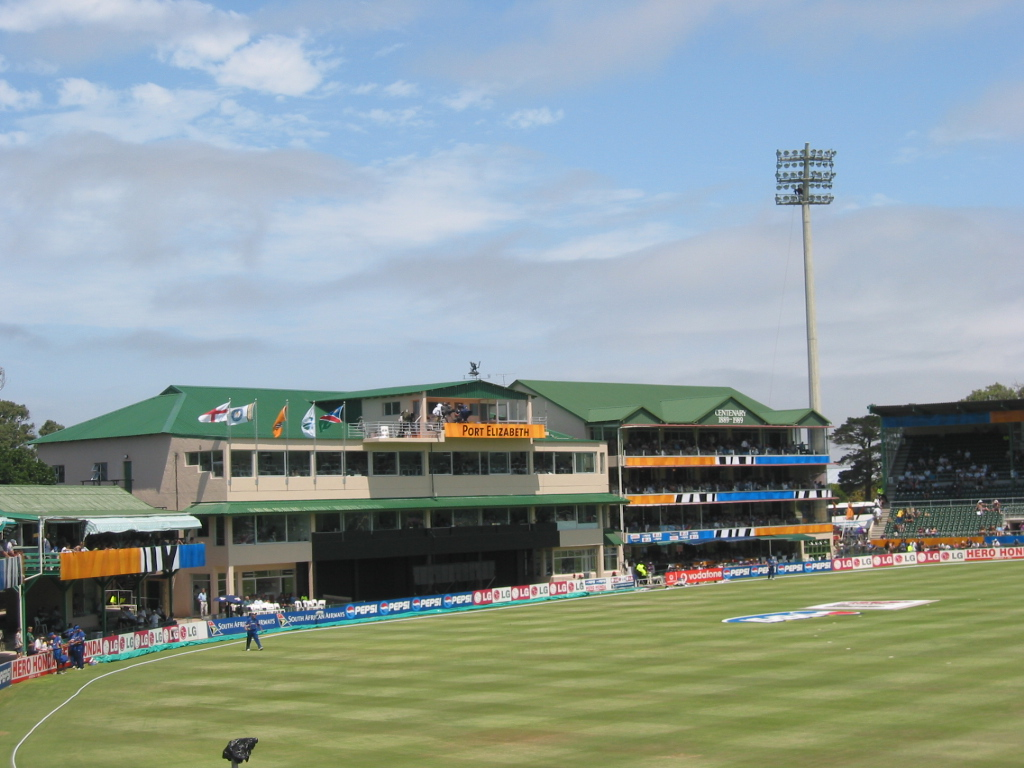
St George's Oval pavilion, Port Elizabeth

== Alternatives ==
Dugouts or benches are generally used instead of pavilions in Twenty20 cricket. The dugout or bench is located just off the field of play, allowing players to enter and exit the field of play more quickly in comparison to a pavilion, therefore maintaining the faster pace of that form of the game (a batsman must be on the field within 90 seconds, rather than within the three minutes allowed in other forms of cricket, for not be given out, timed out) .
