= Ground (cricket) =

Stadium or other location where cricket is played

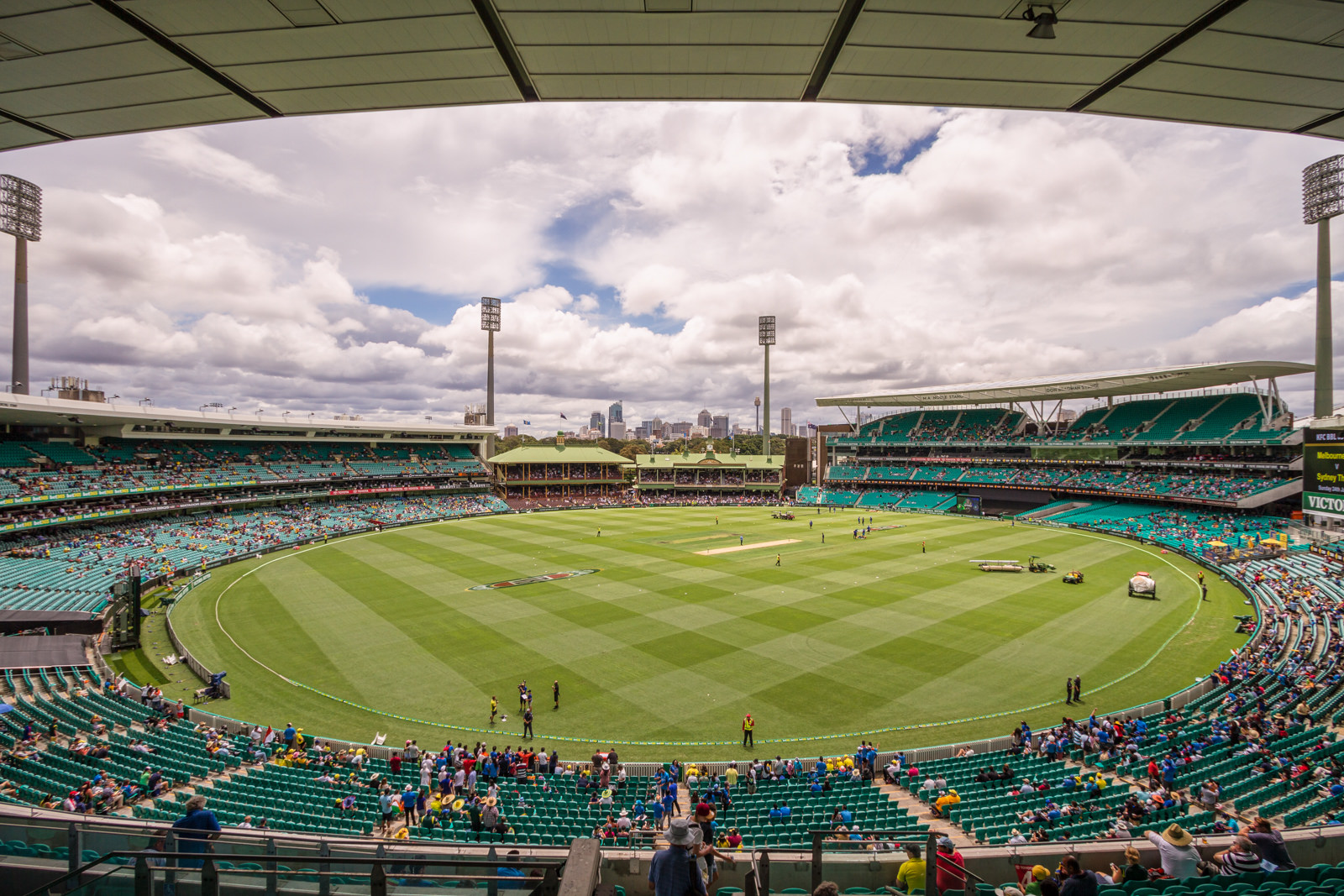
The Sydney Cricket Ground in 2016.

The white lines drawn across the pitch are the popping creases

In cricket, the ground is a location, such as a stadium, where matches are played. The term is also used, in a different context, in Law 30 of The Laws of Cricket.

== Stadium or other location ==
'Ground' can be synonymous with field, if there are few structures and amenities. Where the ground has been developed to limited extent, as for a village or local league club, there may be a small pavilion, sight screens, possibly a scoreboard, and some storage for groundsman's tools and equipment. If the ground is used for first-class cricket, it will have gates, spectator seating, and perhaps floodlights. The ground may also have such amenities as a car park, shops, bars, and conference facilities.

== Law 30 ==
'Ground' also occurs in The Laws of Cricket, but this is in relation to Law 30—Batter Out Of His/Her Ground, which concerns the batter being forward of the popping crease at their end of the pitch. To avoid being stumped or run out, the batter must have some part of their person or bat grounded behind the popping crease. Batters who are making a run are out of their ground, as is a batter who steps forward of the popping crease to meet the ball as soon as it pitches.

The area behind the popping crease is, therefore, a safe zone. Although the actual white line is limited to the width of the pitch, the length of the crease is in fact the full width of the field. If the batter should leave the pitch by walking towards point or square leg, they are still in their ground if they are behind the crease.
