= Arthur Watson (cricketer, born 1884) =

English cricketer

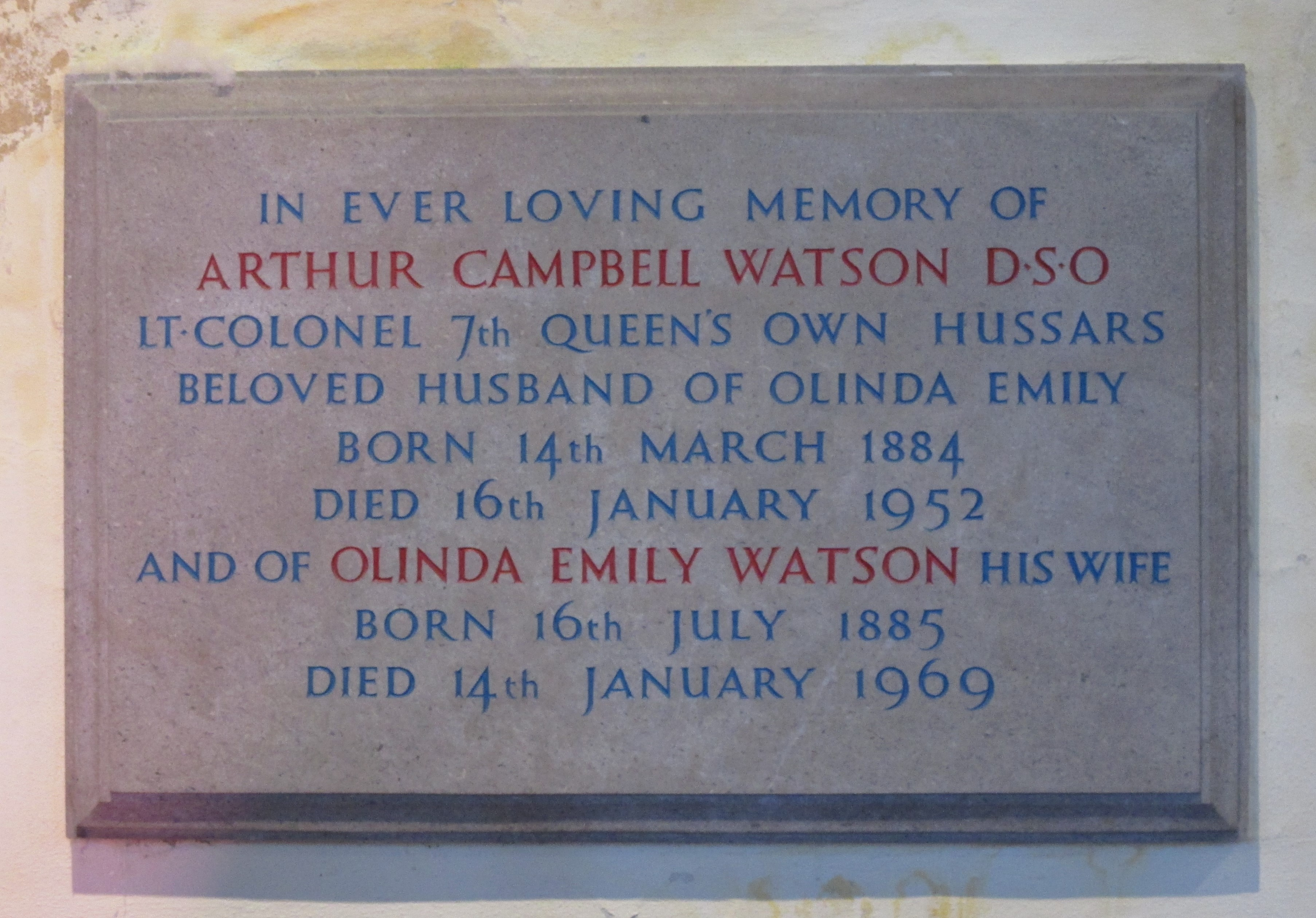
Memorial to Arthur Watson and his wife in St Giles' Church, Shermanbury, West Sussex

Lieutenant Colonel Arthur Campbell Watson (17 March 1884 – 16 January 1952) was a British Army officer and an English cricketer active from 1913 to 1928 who played for Essex and Sussex.

== Life ==
Watson was born in Newdigate, Surrey in 1884, and died in Shermanbury, Sussex in 1952. He was commissioned a second lieutenant in the 4th (Militia) Battalion, Essex Regiment, on 12 October 1901. Militia officers were part time, and he volunteered for active service with the Imperial Yeomanry serving in South Africa during the Second Boer War, joining the 33rd Battalion as a lieutenant from 18 March 1902. After his return to the United Kingdom, he transferred to the regular army where he was commissioned a second lieutenant in the 7th Queen's Own Hussars on 14 January 1903. He later advanced to lieutenant colonel in this regiment, and was appointed a Companion of the Distinguished Service Order (DSO).

He married Olinda Emily (1885–1969), who survived him.

== Cricket ==
Watson appeared in 106 first-class matches as a righthanded batsman who bowled right arm fast. He scored 2,724 runs with a highest score of 111 and took five wickets with a best performance of three for 42.

He is one of only four cricketers to have hit a six over the St Lawrence Lime.
