= Francis Mellersh (cricketer) =

English cricketer

Francis Mellersh (born 23 November 1786 in Slindon, Sussex; died 15 April 1849 in Slindon) was an English amateur cricketer who made 11 known appearances in important matches from 1815 until 1830.

== Career ==
He was mainly associated with Sussex.
