= Sight screen =

Apparatus on a cricket field

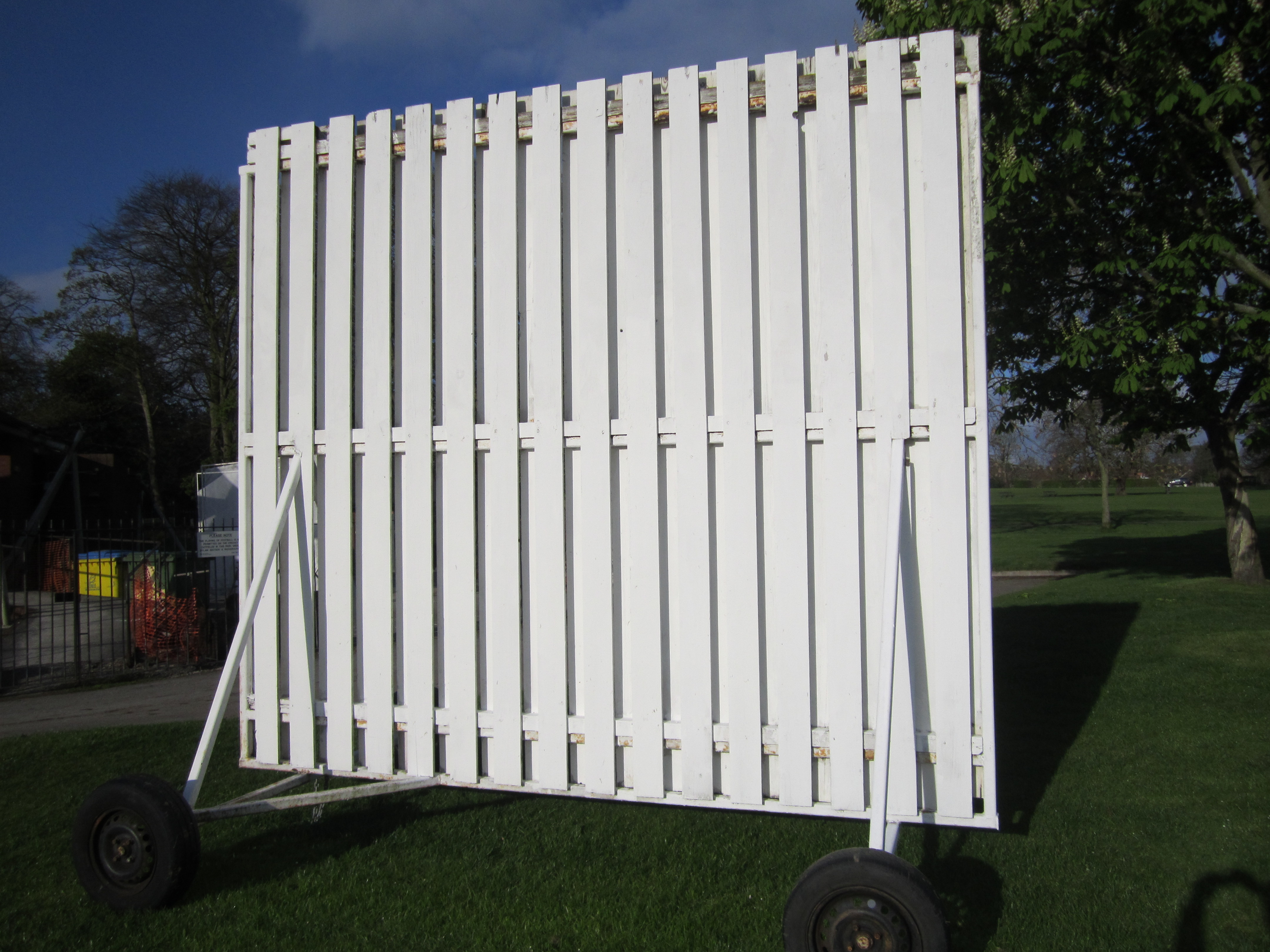
A typical mobile sight screen

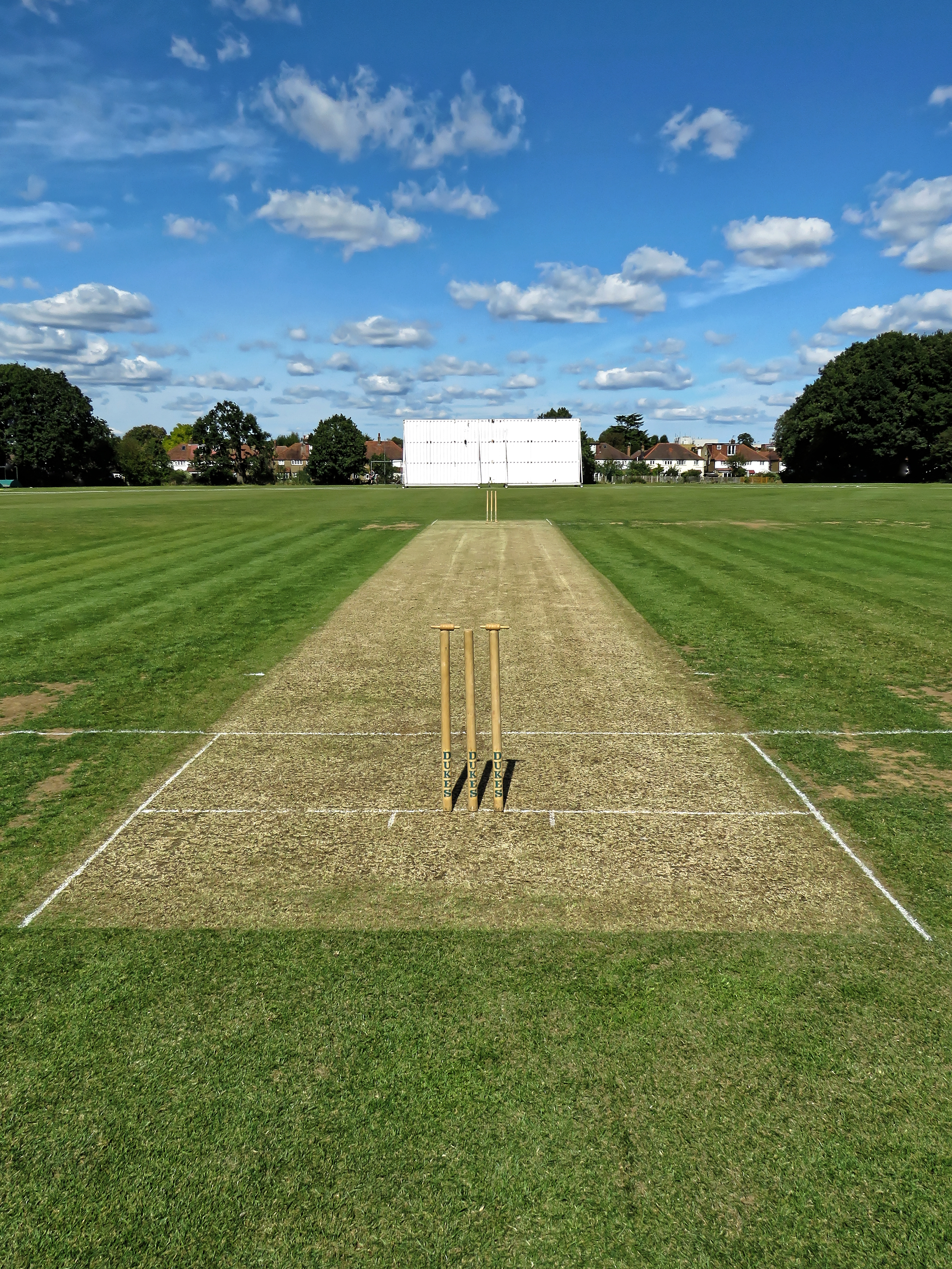
View along a pitch showing the position of the sight screen

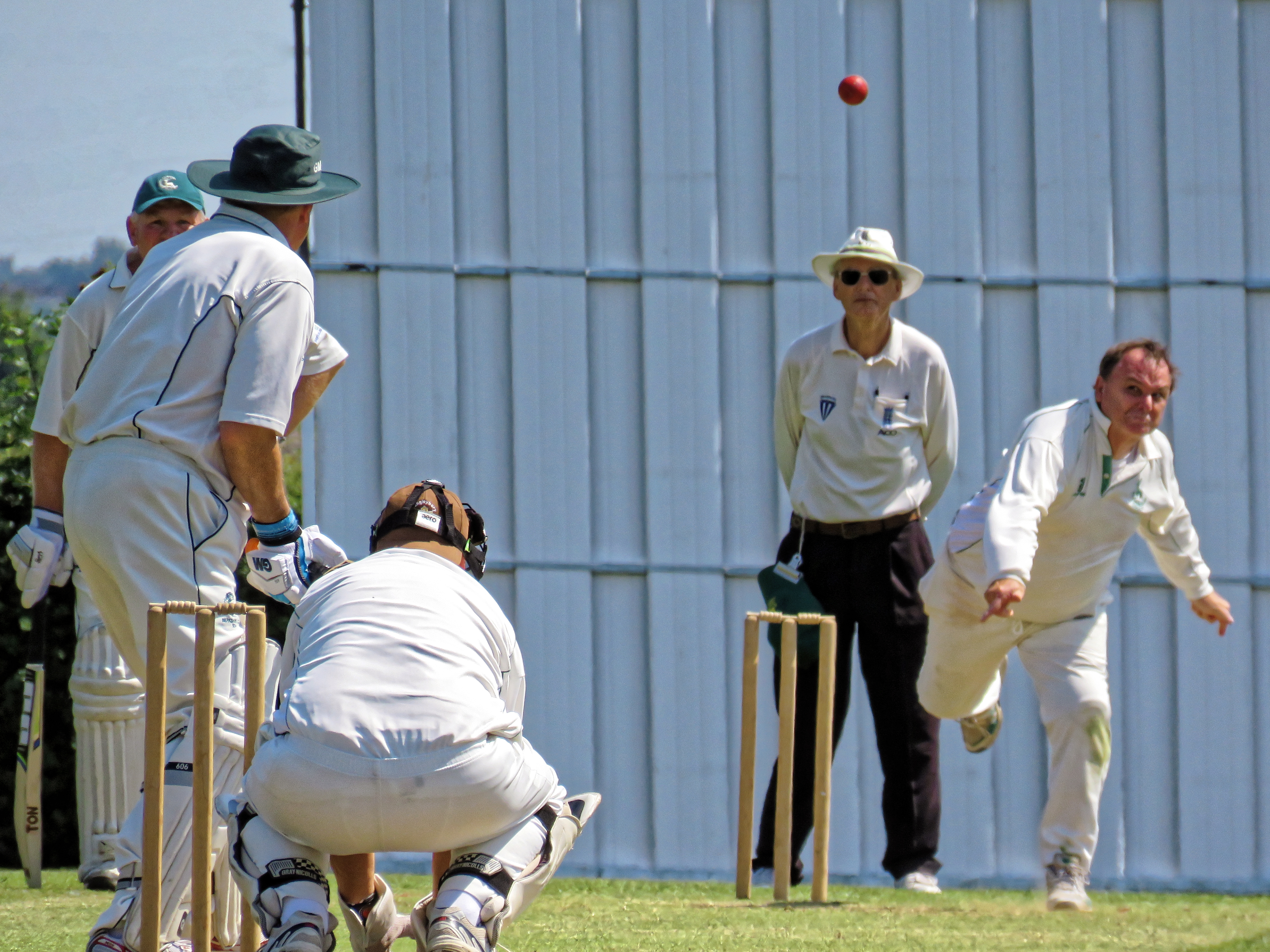
Example of a sight screen in use. The plain white background behind the bowler enables the batter to spot the red ball.

In cricket, a sight screen is an apparatus, often comprising wooden or polycarbonate slats, or cloth sheeting, on a large frame made of wood or another material, that is positioned alongside the cricket field to provide the batters a clear view of the bowler's deliveries, such that distractions including spectators do not disturb the batter.

== Apparatus ==
Typically, two sight screens are actively deployed on a field during live play, each positioned a short distance behind the boundary rope. From the perspective of a batter facing a delivery on the pitch, one sight screen is directly past the bowler's end, or at the straight boundary, while the other is directly behind the batter, or at the long stop boundary.

In limited overs matches such as One Day Internationals or Twenty20 Internationals, which are usually played with a white ball, the sight screen is usually black, or otherwise dark. In Test matches, in which a red or pink ball is used for play, the sight screen is usually white.

Sight screens have, on occasion, not been large enough to entirely cover the critical area for the batsman to effectively view the bowler's delivery. Groundskeepers may make such decisions to allow for more spectators into the ground. Similarly, sight screens have in the past been used for display advertising, compromising their darkness (in limited overs matches) or whiteness (in Tests). On such occasions, batting sides have often expressed frustration, especially if particular batters experienced difficulty in effectively seeing the ball during a fast bowler's delivery. Jacques Kallis lost a wicket to an Andrew Flintoff full toss at Edgbaston Cricket Ground under these circumstances during South Africa's tour of England in 2008, an incident that triggered much debate at the time. In today's game, advertising in ICC-sanctioned Test matches is only allowed on the sight screen behind the wicket-keeper, so that it must be removed every other over and then replaced again after the next over is played from the other end.

The sight screen serves a similar function to the batter's eye in baseball.

== See also ==
- Batter's eye
- Cricket terminology
- Cricket clothing and equipment
