= Mick Malone (cricketer) =

Australian cricketer and rules footballer

Personal information
- Full name: Michael Francis Malone
- Born: 9 October 1950 (age 76); Scarborough, Western Australia
- Batting: Right-handed
- Bowling: Right-arm fast-medium

International information
- National side: Australia
- Only Test (cap 282): 25 August 1977 v England
- ODI debut (cap 33): 2 June 1977 v England
- Last ODI: 27 January 1982 v West Indies

Domestic team information
- Years: Team
- 1974/75–1981/82: Western Australia
- 1979–1980: Lancashire

Career statistics
Competition	Test	ODI	FC	LA
Matches	1	10	73	48
Runs scored	46	36	914	246
Batting average	46.00	9.00	16.03	14.47
100s/50s	0/0	0/0	0/0	0/0
Top score	46	15*	46	47*
Balls bowled	342	612	15,209	2,554
Wickets	6	11	260	54
Bowling average	12.83	28.63	24.77	26.22
5 wickets in innings	1	0	13	0
10 wickets in match	0	0	1	0
Best bowling	5/63	2/9	7/88	4/30
Catches/stumpings	0/–	1/–	30/–	9/–
- Source: ESPNcricinfo, 15 February 2019

Michael Francis Malone (born 9 October 1950) is a former Australian cricketer who played in one Test match and ten One Day Internationals between 1977 and 1982. Malone played his only Test prior to joining World Series Cricket. In English county cricket he had a stint with Lancashire. He was also an Australian rules football full-forward and played in 104 WANFL games for Subiaco.

== First-class career ==
=== 1974–75: Debut for Western Australia ===
Malone made his first-class debut for Western Australia on 21 February 1975, against Victoria in the Sheffield Shield. He took five wickets in the match, getting Bob Baldry twice.

In his second appearance, against New South Wales he took seven wickets in the match, including that of Test star batsman and Blues captain Doug Walters. Western Australia won the Sheffield Shield that year, Malone playing in the vital final two matches of the season.

=== 1975–76 ===
In his second season of Shield cricket (1975–76) Malone took 28 wickets at an average of just 18.75, including two five-wicket hauls. Only Australian test players Dennis Lillee, Jeff Thomson, Ashley Mallett and Alan Hurst took more wickets, although Malone's average was superior to them all.

He won man of the match in a Gillette Cup game where he took 2-37 and scored 33 in an 88-run partnership with John Inverarity that helped WA in the game.

=== 1976–77 ===
The 1976–77 Sheffield Shield season was Malone's most productive. He finished as the competition's leading wicket taker with an amazing 40 wickets in just eight matches at an average of just 16.12, with four five-wicket innings. West Australia won the Shield and the Gillette Cup that season. Malone was voted the second-best Shield player of the season.

In a Shield game against Victoria, Malone took part in a 41-run partnership with Dennis Lillee that helped WA to a narrow in.

He won another man of a match game for the Gilette Cup final, when his innings of 47 not out (batting at nine), including a 51-run partnership with Craig Serjeant, took WA to a victory with five balls to go. "It was a superb performance", said captain Rod Marsh. "Above and beyond the call of duty.He's done that for us to win three games against Victoria, once in the Gillette Cup last year, in a recent Shield match and now". He later took 6–33 against Victoria in a Shield game.

=== 1977 Ashes ===
After such a strong season, Malone had to be included in the Australia touring party to England in 1977. It was felt Malone would battle for the third paceman spot with Len Pascoe and Geoff Dymock, to support Jeff Thomson and Max Walker.

Malone took a wicket with his first ball in England, a one-day game. News broke early in the tour that most of the Australian squad had signed to play World Series Cricket including Malone.

At the beginning of the tour, Malone was picked for two One-Day Internationals. England won both games easily, Malone taking two wickets in the first match and going wicketless in the second. In the Tests, the selectors preferred Pascoe as the third paceman. Pascoe bowled well but fell injured for the fifth Test, and Malone took his place.

Malone's Test would be his only one. At the Kennington Oval, he had what he called his "golden moment", taking five for 63 in England's first innings with his medium-fast high action and then scoring 46 as a tailender. The match was drawn, but Australia had lost the series 3–0.

The press in Australia and England blamed the hype surrounding Kerry Packer and his proposed World Series Cricket for tension within the Australian side (Malone had already signed a contract), leading to the poor performances. Malone disagrees, "The press said we were a divided side", says Malone, "but that was not the case. There were 13 of the 17 players who had signed for Packer and we all knew each other and got on, Packer and non-Packer players. The reason we lost was because we were outplayed by a better side and because Geoff Boycott was sensational."

=== 1977–78 and 1978–79: World Series Cricket ===
Malone was a peripheral figure in World Series Cricket, appearing in just one Supertest in 1979 against the West Indies at VFL Park, Melbourne. He took three wickets in the match (Clive Lloyd, Richard Austin and Viv Richards) and scored seven runs. The match was drawn.

He featured more in the limited-overs matches. In the 1977–78 International Cup he took four wickets in four matches.

The Country Cup tours provided Malone with more match time. In the 1977–78 Country Cup he played eight times, taking 25 wickets at an average of just 20.76. His economy rate for that tour was a very impressive 2.78 runs per over. Malone took 3 for 62 in the 75-over Country Cup Final that the Australians lost to the World XI at Manuka Oval, Canberra. He also took 5–35 in a game against the World XI in Hamilton.

In the 1978–79 season, Malone played eight matches of the tour to New Zealand (against the World XI) taking 14 wickets (average 13.14), with best figures of 4 for 9 in 10 overs at Cooks Gardens, Wanganui (50-over match). Malone hoped this form would see him selected more often for the Australian XI in the lucrative Supertests and International Cup. He did play 11 matches in the International Cup taking 10 wickets. Three of those matches were in the best of four final against the West Indies. Australia lost the winner-takes-all series 3–1.

Malone ended World Series Cricket on the tour to the West Indies, playing in six limited-overs matches. He took 6 wickets at an average of 27.50. The West Indies won the series 8–2. Australia lost every game that Malone played in.

Malone later said some players from his club Scarborough "didn't support me" about World Series Cricket. "I couldn't understand that". But Malone said "I've got no regrets whatsoever in any way regarding joining World Series Cricket. Not one single regret... the security in World Series Cricket was magnificent".

=== 1979: Lancashire ===
In 1979, Malone moved to England to play as professional with Haslingden Cricket Club in the Lancashire League. Dennis Lillee had played for Haslingden in 1971. Other pros in the league at the time included Pakistan's Mudassar Nazar (Burnley), Nasim-ul-Ghani (Lowerhouse), Anwar Khan (Rishton), Mohsin Khan (Accrington) and Aftab Baloch (Todmorden), fellow Aussie Peter Sleep (East Lancashire), Indians Madan Lal (Enfield) and Rakesh Shukla (Colne). The league had a reputation of being hard, with many famous overseas professionals having played there (including Ian Chappell). Malone took 45 wickets in the league at an average of a little over 10.

Malone was signed as the second overseas player for Lancashire alongside the great Clive Lloyd, replacing South African Paul Robinson. In two matches he took a remarkable 18 wickets, including a career best 7-for-88 against Nottinghamshire at Blackpool. He dismissed star batsmen Derek Randall and Clive Rice. In his second match for Lancashire, Malone took 6 for 60 against Leicestershire, David Gower among his wickets.

=== 1979–80: Return to establishment cricket and touring Pakistan ===
Benefiting from his spell in England, Malone returned to Shield cricket for Western Australia for the 1979–80 season. World Series cricket players were playing with non-World Series Cricket players. "I can see it being completely forgotten in a couple of months", said Malone. "I think there are some initial problems, particularly with selection, but once everyone plays against each other again in Shield competition, it'll be pretty clear who the better cricketers are.... When we are all playing together it'll be clear who should be in the side and who shouldn't be".

He took 32 wickets in the expanded competition at a more modest average of 28.75, in what was a poor season for the side; they won just once, at home against whipping-boys Tasmania. However his form was good enough to earn a recall to the Australia party for the tour to Pakistan.

He did not play in any of the three Tests. Malone was picked against the BCCP President's XI and Punjab Governor's XI he struggled on the slow pitches taking just one wicket and bowling few overs, as Australia relied heavily on the spin of Ray Bright.

=== 1980: Return to Lancashire ===
Malone returned to Lancashire for the entire 1980 season playing 15 county championship matches. He was sponsored $50 a wicket.

He was the county's second-highest wicket-taker with 45 wickets (average 25.88), behind Willie Hogg who had 50 (average 21.16). Lancashire finished a disappointing third-bottom in the table, winning only four games. Malone did face the touring Australians in a three-day match, but did not take a wicket.

=== 1980–81 ===
Malone would play just two more seasons of Shield cricket for Western Australia before retiring at the end of the 1981–82, playing just twelve more matches. The 1980–81 season yielded just 14 wickets, while he took 13 in his final season—although Western Australia did win the Shield again in 1980–81.

He took 2-18 off 10 overs in the McDonald's Cup semi-final.

An injury meant he was unable to play for Lancashire in 1981.

=== 1981–82: Return to Australian side ===
Some solid domestic form saw Malone return to the Australian side for the World Series Cup, the official spin-off from WSC, against Pakistan and the West Indies in 1981–82. He replaced an injured Terry Alderman.

He had a superb comeback game taking 2-9 off ten overs. He kept his spot in subsequent games. He would play eight times taking 9 wickets at an average of 27.88, he was also Australia's most economical bowler conceding just 3.13 runs per over.

Malone was picked in that season's Australian squad to play the West Indies for the third Test at Adelaide, replacing Terry Alderman, but was 12th man. He was discussed as a possibility for the 1982 tour of New Zealand. He did not tour, and announced his retirement from first-class cricket. His final game was a one-day match against Victoria, in which he took 3-19 off seven overs. Malone said "I felt I was struggling to get into the Shield team and I just thought it was time to retire. I have no qualms about my decision and I could not have finished off on a better note by getting a wicket on the last ball I bowled."

== Outside cricket ==
Malone retired at the end of the 1981–82 season, finishing with first-class career figures of 73 matches 260 wickets at an average of 24.77.

Australian Rules Football

In the Australian winter he was an Australian rules football full-forward and played in 104 WANFL games for Subiaco, including their 1973 Premiership. In 1978 Malone played his 100th game for Subiaco and also topped their goalkicking with 54.47. It was his last season of pro-footy.

Malone now runs Mick Malone Real Estate based in Doubleview, Western Australia.
