= Dick Tyldesley =

English cricketer (1897–1943)

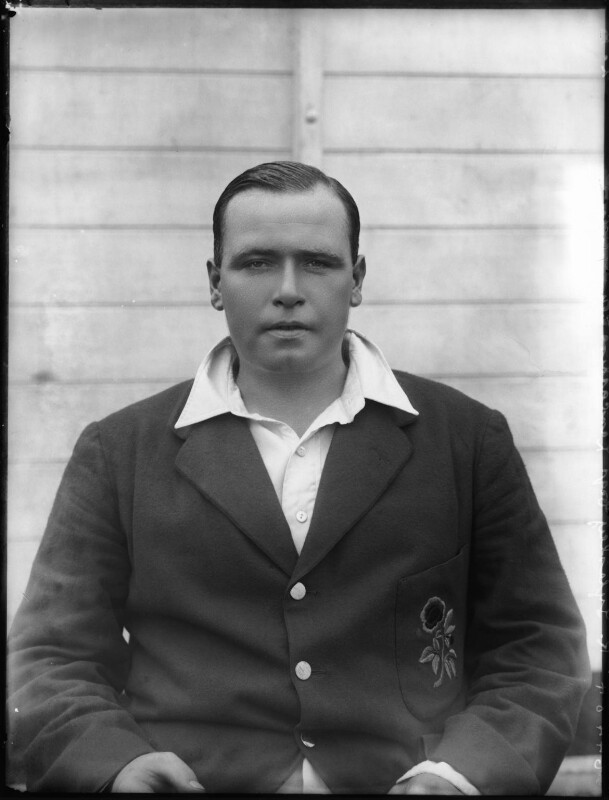
- Tyldesley in 1924

Personal information
- Full name: Richard Knowles Tyldesley
- Batting: Right-handed
- Bowling: Legbreak

International information
- National side: England (1924–1930)
- Test debut (cap 218): 28 June 1924 v South Africa
- Last Test: 11 July 1930 v Australia

Career statistics
| Competition | Test | First-class |
|---|---|---|
| Matches | 7 | 397 |
| Runs scored | 47 | 6,419 |
| Batting average | 7.83 | 15.65 |
| 100s/50s | 0/0 | 1/15 |
| Top score | 29 | 105 |
| Balls bowled | 1,615 | 66,696 |
| Wickets | 19 | 1,509 |
| Bowling average | 32.57 | 17.21 |
| 5 wickets in innings | 0 | 101 |
| 10 wickets in match | 0 | 22 |
| Best bowling | 3/50 | 8/15 |
| Catches/stumpings | 1/– | 334/– |
- Source: ESPNCricinfo, 7 November 2022

Richard Knowles Tyldesley (11 March 1897 – 17 September 1943) was a Lancashire cricketer who was one of the most important figures in Lancashire breaking Yorkshire's stronghold on the County Championship between 1926 and 1930. He was the youngest of four brothers who all played for Lancashire, but were unrelated to the Worsley family that produced the two famous brothers Johnny and Ernest Tyldesley.

== Career ==
As a boy of 13, Dick Tyldesley gained a place in the Westhoughton team in the Bolton and District League and when as young as fifteen he already headed the bowling averages. He continued to play for Bolton through the World War I years, but was already on the Old Trafford ground staff when county cricket resumed after the war, although he initially preferred to continue playing in the League and was not available for county matches with Saturday play.

With Dean out of form and Cook still in the Army, Dick Tyldesley played whenever he was not assisting Westhoughton. Though he kept a perfect length and could flight the ball extremely well, at this early stage Tyldesley had so little spin that he was not a deadly force on sticky wickets. He also showed promise as a hard-hitting batsman and demonstrated his ability as a close fielder capable of tackling the hardest hits. He set a Lancashire record with six catches in an innings against Hampshire in 1921.

By 1921, he was one of the leading bowlers for Lancashire, and in 1922, gaining more spin on the ball on sticky wickets, Dick Tyldesley took 100 first-class wickets. He also scored 105 against Nottinghamshire at Old Trafford and remarkably was Lancashire's fourth-highest run-scorer – though with less than half the aggregates of Ernest Tyldesley, Hallows and Makepeace. It was from 1923, however, that he leaped to the top of the tree through increasing his finger spin to become a deadly bowler on the many sticky pitches found in the North. Dick Tyldesley took 140 wickets that season. In 1924 – a summer so wet that only one Lancashire match was played throughout on a pitch unaffected by rain – he was consistently deadly, except against the most exceptionally skilled batsmen, being helped in this season and subsequently by many batsmen refusing to use their feet and ineffectually playing back.

Tyldesley's record that summer won him a place on the Ashes tour of 1924–1925, but he was a dreadful failure on the cast-iron Australian wickets where the ball came straight through. In a remarkable contrast to his record in England, his first-class wickets for the whole tour cost 40 runs apiece, and he did not take a single Test wicket. However, at home Tyldesley maintained his form as a bowler exceptionally well, and after a slight lapse in 1927 and 1928 he was back at his best in 1929, heading the first-class bowling averages and invariably proving unplayable after showers in a very dry summer. With Australian paceman Ted McDonald, Tyldesley formed a bowling combination that was sufficient to give Lancashire a hat-trick of Championship wins between 1926 and 1928: during these three years McDonald took 484 wickets and Tyldesley 303 – though Tyldesley actually had a better average. As a batsman, though, Dick Tyldesley declined to the point of only making two fifties after 1926.

In 1930 Dick Tyldesley played a vital role in Lancashire's fourth Championship in five years, taking 121 Championship wickets for 14.73 each. He was recalled to the Test side with only moderate success, but remained Lancashire's leading bowler in 1931.

== Dispute and end of career ==
Unfortunately, 1931 proved Dick Tyldesley's last season of county cricket. That November, he asked Lancashire for a guaranteed salary of £400 for five seasons – ostensibly as insurance against a possible future loss of form. When the dispute became public, Tyldesley revealed that he had been protesting against certain aspects of his contract for a number of years.

Dick Tyldesley played for some years in the Lancashire League, as professional for Haslingden (1932), East Lancashire (1933), Accrington (1934–35) and Lowerhouse (1936) and then became landlord of the Dog and Pheasant pub at Wingates, Westhoughton. He would play one more first-class match, for Sir L. Parkinson's XI v Leicestershire at Blackpool in 1935, and as late as 1939 bowled with conspicuous success in the minor leagues – averaging seven wickets a match in the Lancashire and Cheshire League. Often viewed as overweight and measured at 18 stone or 110 kilograms in his playing days, he died at the young age of forty-six in 1943, by when he was the only survivor among the four brothers.
