= East Lancashire Cricket Club =

Cricket club in the Lancashire League

East Lancashire Cricket Club
| League | Lancashire League |
| Ground | Alexandra Meadows, Blackburn, Lancashire |
| Professional | Adithya Siriwardhana (Sri Lanka) |
| 2023 League Position | 5th (Div 2) |

East Lancashire Cricket Club is a cricket club in the Lancashire League, which plays its home games at Alexandra Meadows in Blackburn. For the 2024 season its captain is James Westhead and its professional is Adithya Siriwardhana. The club has been successful, winning the League on 14 occasions, the Worsley Cup a record 18 times, and the Inter League Club Challenge Trophy twice. It has employed professionals including Fazal Mahmood, Allan Border and Paul Reiffel.

== Honours ==
- 1st XI League winners - 14 - 1919, 1942, 1947, 1949, 1951, 1952, 1963, 1966, 1972, 1973, 1980, 1984, 1990, 2003
- 1st XI League runners-up - 17 - 1896, 1901, 1913, 1916, 1943 (shared), 1944, 1945, 1946, 1969, 1983, 1988, 1991, 1996, 1997, 1998, 1999, 2001
- Worsley Cup winners - 18 - 1925, 1929, 1933, 1947, 1949, 1951, 1952, 1961, 1966, 1968, 1971, 1980, 1981, 1983, 1987, 1988, 1998, 2007
- Inter League Club Challenge Trophy winners - 2 - 2004, 2006
- 20/20 Cup winners - 1 - 2008
- Ron Singleton Colne Trophy winners - 3 - 1999, 2004 (shared), 2008
- 2nd XI League winners - 13 - 1894, 1925 (shared), 1947, 1949, 1963 (shared), 1967, 1969, 1974, 1976, 1983, 1987, 1994, 2004
- 2nd XI League runners-up - 5 - 1981, 1982, 1985, 1998, 2014
- 2nd XI (Lancashire Telegraph) Cup winners - 6 - 1974, 1983, 1985, 1986, 1997, 2014
- 3rd XI League winners - 1 - 1997
- 3rd XI League runners-up - 3 - 2000, 2001, 2014

== Team and player achievements ==
- Highest League Time Cricket Score - 289 v Rawtenstall at Rawtenstall on 6 August 1906
- Highest League Limited Overs Score - 326-4 v Todmorden at East Lancs on 12 June 2005
- Highest Worsley Cup Time Cricket Score - 396 v Accrington at East Lancs on 28 June 1923
- Highest Worsley Cup Limited Overs Score - 327-4 v Bacup at East Lancs on 28 May 2005
- Highest Inter League Club Challenge Trophy Score - 311-4 v Enfield at East Lancs on 28 August 2006
- Highest 20/20 Cup Score - 169-4 v Rishton at Rishton on 26 June 2009
- Highest Individual League Score (Professional) - 151 - Quinton Friend v Church at Church on 1 August 2004
- Highest Individual Worsley Cup Score (Professional) - 179* - Allan Border v Rawtenstall at Rawtenstall on 18 June 1978
- Highest Individual League Score (Amateur) - 139 - David Pearson v Nelson at Nelson on 9 May 2010
- Highest Individual Worsley Cup Score (Amateur) - 177* - Paul Turner v Bacup at East Lancs on 28 May 2005
- Highest Individual 20/20 Cup Score (Professional) - 109* - Brendan Nash v Rishton at Rishton on 26 June 2009
- Highest Individual 20/20 Cup Score (Amateur) - 99 - Paul Turner v Haslingden at Haslingden on 17 June 2005
- Best Bowling Figures (Professional) - 9-22 - Loots Bosman v Colne at Colne on 1 May 2005 and Freddie Bull v Rawtenstall at East Lancs on 8 May 1907
- Best Bowling Figures (Amateurs) - 9-19 - Jonathan Brooks v Accrington at Accrington on 23 September 1916
- Best 20/20 Bowling Figures (Professional) - 4-11 - Ockert Erasmus v Accrington at East Lancs on 31 May 2013
- Best 20/20 Bowling Figures (Amateur) - 6-20 - Minhaj Bhada v Rawtenstall at Rawtenstall on 26 June 2015
- Amateur Batsmen with over 1,000 runs in a season - David Pearson - 1994, Paul Turner - 2003
- Professional Batsmen with over 1,000 runs in a season - Kerry O'Keeffe - 1975, Allan Border - 1978, Johann Louw - 2003, Shanan Stewart - 2007
- Amateur Bowlers with over 100 wickets in a season - Jonathan Brooks - 1916, J. Coulthurst - 1919
- Professional Bowlers with over 100 wickets in a season - Billy Mitchell - 1902, Freddie Bull - 1907, Victor Norbury - 1912, 1913, Bill Merritt - 1934, 1935, Bruce Dooland - 1949, Fazal Mahmood - 1959, Ray Strauss - 1960, Paul Reiffel - 1990, Claude Henderson - 1999
