= Helm Spencer =

English cricketer

Helm Spencer (31 December 1891 – 7 December 1974) was an English first-class cricketer. A right-arm fast-medium bowler and lower-order right-hand bat, Spencer played for Lancashire, Glamorgan and Wales in 43 matches between 1914 and 1925. He was born at Padiham, Lancashire and died at Burnley, also in Lancashire.

== Career ==
Spencer played Lancashire League cricket for local club Lowerhouse before joining the Lancashire county team in 1913. He played only two matches for Lancashire's first team after a stint in the second team; he took three wickets in those two games.

The First World War then interrupted Spencer's career, and he returned to first-class cricket only in 1923, playing for Glamorgan and Wales. He played 39 matches for Glamorgan, taking 101 wickets at 22.47 including a best of 7/33. Together with seven wickets for Wales, this would leave Spencer with 111 wickets at first-class level, at a bowling average of 22.67. He then returned to the Lancashire League and Lowerhouse, playing as well at Bacup and Colne, until 1937.
