= Walter Robinson (cricketer) =

English cricketer

Walter Robinson (29 November 1851 – 14 August 1919) was an English first-class cricketer, who played seven matches for Yorkshire County Cricket Club from 1876 to 1877, and for Lancashire County Cricket Club from 1880 to 1888. He also played first-class cricket for The Players (1881–1883), the Rest of England (1883), the North of England (1883), R.G. Barlow's XI (1883) and an England XI (1884).

Born in Greetland, Elland, Yorkshire, England, Robinson was a right-handed batsman, who scored 3,902 runs at 19.31, with a highest score of 154 against Oxford University. His three other centuries were scored against Yorkshire, Middlesex and Kent. He took 52 catches and, bowling right arm, round arm medium pace, conceded 61 runs without taking a wicket.

He learnt his cricket in Yorkshire, but first played as a professional in Lancashire, with Haslingden C.C. in 1873 and 1874. In 1875, he was engaged by Cliffe End C.C., Longwood, near Huddersfield and, in 1876 and 1877, at Bacup C.C. Yorkshire gave him a chance during 1876 and 1877, but he found little success. He moved to the Littleborough C.C., in Lancashire, in 1878 where he stayed until 1885, qualifying to play for Lancashire County Cricket Club by residence. He played 115 matches for them from 1880 to 1888. In 1886, he was back at Haslingden for a year and then moved to Colne C.C. (1887–90), before taking up an engagement at St Helens Recreation C.C., where he stayed until 1898. His last known engagement was at Prescot C.C.

Robinson died in August 1919.
