= John Cuffe =

Australian sportsman (1880–1931)

Personal information
- Full name: John Alexander Cuffe
- Born: 26 June 1880; Coonamble, New South Wales, Australia
- Died: 5 May 1931 (aged 50); Burton upon Trent, England
- Batting: Right-handed
- Bowling: Slow left-arm orthodox

Domestic team information
- Years: Team
- 1902/03: New South Wales
- 1903–1914: Worcestershire
- 1919: Todmorden
- 1924: Lowerhouse
- FC debut: 26 December 1902 New South Wales v Queensland
- Last FC: 24 August 1914 Worcestershire v Sussex

Umpiring information
- FC umpired: 66 (1925–1927)

Career statistics
Competition	First-class
Matches	221
Runs scored	7,476
Batting average	22.25
100s/50s	4/39
Top score	145
Balls bowled	41,065
Wickets	738
Bowling average	25.45
5 wickets in innings	33
10 wickets in match	7
Best bowling	9/38
Catches/stumpings	127/–
- Source: CricketArchive, 9 December 2022

John Alexander Cuffe (26 June 1880 – 5 May 1931) was an Australian-born English first-class cricketer who played more than 200 times for Worcestershire between 1903 and 1914, having previously made a single appearance for New South Wales. After retiring from county cricket, he stood as an umpire for three years in the 1920s. He also played at least once as a professional for Lowerhouse in the Lancashire League. It was wrongly thought until 2019 that Cuffe was also a footballer and played ten seasons for Glossop North End in the Football League Second Division. The footballer was a different John Cuffe, born in Glossop.

== Cricket career ==
=== New South Wales ===
Born in Coonamble, New South Wales, Cuffe made his first-class debut for that state side, against Queensland at Sydney on Boxing Day 1902. He made 5 and 25 with the bat, and took the single wicket of Charles Patrick. This was the only time Cuffe played in a first-class match outside England. (He did turn out for Worcestershire against Glamorgan at Cardiff Arms Park in 1910, but this game did not have first-class status.)

=== Worcestershire ===
Cuffe then came to England, making his Worcestershire debut against Oxford University at The Parks in May 1903. He was not yet qualified to appear in the County Championship, but also played against Cambridge University and the Philadelphians that season, scoring 91 against the latter side. He again turned out three times in 1904, playing once each against the universities and appearing also against the touring South Africans, claiming 5–58 in an innings defeat of Oxford.

For the ten seasons from 1905 to 1914, Cuffe was a regular part of the Worcestershire side, and he made a career-best 145 against Hampshire in the first of those years. On three occasions — 1906, 1908 and 1911 — he passed 1,000 first-class runs in a season, while in 1907 and 1911 he obtained his hundred wickets. His "double" in 1911 consisted of 1,054 runs at 25.70 (even though he made no score greater than 78) and 110 wickets at 23.56. His best bowling figures (9-38) were achieved against Yorkshire at Bradford in 1907, but in the above-mentioned minor game against Glamorgan in 1910 he returned the first-innings analysis of 8.1-4-5-9. Also in 1910, he performed the hat-trick against Hampshire at Dean Park, Bournemouth.

In what turned out to be the last three years of his first-class career, 1912 to 1914, his bowling continued to be quite productive with at least 50 wickets in each summer. Indeed, he took 11–163 in the match against Gloucestershire as late as July 1914. His batting, however, declined, and in 99 first-class innings he made only three half-centuries. Cuffe's final first-class game came against Sussex at Eastbourne in late August 1914. In a two-day innings defeat he scored 10 and did not bowl a ball; his career ended when he was absent hurt in the second innings.

=== Post First World War ===
Cuffe did not reappear in first-class cricket after the First World War.

After stints in the Lancashire League with Todmorden and Lowerhouse Cuffe retired from playing.

=== Umpiring career ===
Cuffe stood as an umpire in 66 first-class matches between 1925 and 1927.

=== Coaching career ===
He later took a position as coach at Repton School.

== Football career ==
John Cuffe
Personal information
- Full name: John Alexander Cuffe
- Date of birth: 26 June 1880
- Place of birth: Coonamble, New South Wales
- Place of death: Burton upon Trent, England

Senior career*
Years	Team	Apps	(Gls)
1905–1914	Glossop North End		
- * Club domestic league appearances and goals

Cuffe was incorrectly recognised as being the first Australian to play in the Football League. Playing with Glossop North End between 1905 and 1914. This was incorrect, the John Cuffe who played 282 matches as a full-back was a native of Glossop.

== Death ==
Cuffe was found drowned at Burton-on-Trent on 16 May 1932, aged 51. He had taken up the post of cricket professional at Repton School the day before. He was first reported missing, but was later judged to have committed suicide. He had been staying in the Boot Inn in Repton.

== See also ==
- List of solved missing person cases
