= Arthur Dawson (footballer, born 1882) =

English footballer and cricketer

Personal information
- Full name: Arthur Dawson
- Date of birth: 9 January 1882
- Place of birth: Blackburn, England
- Date of death: 1951 (aged 69)
- Position: Winger

Senior career*
Years	Team	Apps	(Gls)
1903–1907	Blackburn Rovers	18	(4)
1907–1908	Nelson	?	(?)
1908–1909	Burnley	1	(0)
- * Club domestic league appearances and goals

Arthur Dawson (1882–1951) was an English all-round sportsman. He played professional association football as a winger for Blackburn Rovers, and played amateur cricket in the Lancashire League.

Arthur Dawson batted for Rishton from 1901 to 1912, and opened for East Lancs. between 1913 and 1921. On many occasions he was batting opposite Victor Norbury, and one of their partnerships became an East Lancs. record not bettered until the 1960s. Both players featured strongly in the 1919 League win, scoring over 45% of the total runs between them in roughly equal measure.
