= Billy Williams (cricketer, born 1887) =

English cricketer

Ambrose Causer Williams (1 March 1887 – 1 June 1966), better known as Billy Williams, was an English first-class cricketer who played twelve matches for Yorkshire County Cricket Club between 1911 and 1919. He played in the Lancashire League for Haslingden C.C. in 1920 and 1921, and for the Yorkshire Second XI from 1911 to 1919.

== Biography ==
Born in Middlewood, Darfield, Yorkshire, England, Williams was a right arm fast bowler, who took thirty first-class wickets at 22.60, with his best return of 9 for 29 against Hampshire. He took five wickets in an innings twice, and ten wickets in a match on one occasion. Williams scored 95 runs, as a right hand bat, with a best of 48 not out against Derbyshire. He took six catches in the field.

Williams played his early cricket with Darfield C.C., Mitchell Main C.C. and Barnsley C.C. (1911–1913), and was subsequently a professional with Haslingden C.C. when they finished as league champions. He also had spells at Rawtenstall C.C., Todmorden C.C., Heywood C.C., Slaithwaite C.C., Barrow C.C., South Kirkby C.C. and finally Mexborough Athletic in 1933.

He died in June 1966, in Morecambe, Lancashire.
