= Henry Smoker =

English footballer (1881–1966)

Personal information
- Full name: Henry George Smoker
- Date of birth: 1 March 1881
- Place of birth: Hinton Ampner, Hampshire, England
- Date of death: 7 September 1966 (aged 85)
- Place of death: Wallasey, Cheshire, England
- Position: Outside left

Senior career*
| Years | Team | Apps | (Gls) |
| 1900–1904 | Southampton | 2 | (0) |
- Cricket career
Personal information
- Batting: Left-handed
- Bowling: Right-arm medium-fast
- Relatives: George Smoker (father)
Domestic team information
- Years: Team
- 1901–1907: Hampshire
- 1909–1925: Cheshire
Career statistics
| Competition | First-class |
|---|---|
| Matches | 31 |
| Runs scored | 334 |
| Batting average | 9.54 |
| 100s/50s | –/– |
| Top score | 39* |
| Balls bowled | 1,416 |
| Wickets | 33 |
| Bowling average | 22.21 |
| 5 wickets in innings | 2 |
| 10 wickets in match | – |
| Best bowling | 7/35 |
| Catches/stumpings | 18/– |
- Source: CricInfo, 10 September 2009
- * Club domestic league appearances and goals

Henry George Smoker (1 March 1881 – 7 September 1966) was an English sportsman who played football for Southampton and first-class cricket for Hampshire. He also played minor counties cricket for Cheshire.

== Football career ==
The son of George Smoker who had played cricket for Hampshire in the 1880s, he was born at Hinton Ampner near Alresford in Hampshire in March 1881. Smoker signed for Southampton of the Southern Football League in the close-season of 1900, but spent most of his career at The Dell in the reserves. Described as "a speedy left-winger who favoured taking on the full-back rather than delivering the early cross", he eventually made his first-team debut over three years after joining Southampton when he took the place of the injured Dick Evans for the match against Wellingborough Town on 7 November 1903. His only other appearance for Southampton came on 2 January 1904; Evans was now out with a serious leg injury and trainer Bill Dawson had tried to fill the vacancy at outside-left, firstly with John Fraser and then Harry Turner, before settling on Joe Turner, with Southampton going on to claim their sixth, and last, Southern League championship. In the summer of 1904, Smoker decided to quit professional football to concentrate on his cricket career.

== Cricket career ==
Smoker made his debut in first-class cricket for Hampshire against Lancashire at Portsmouth in the 1901 County Championship. His most prolific season was in 1907, when he played 11 matches, though he missed part of the season due to measles. In this season, he took 31 wickets with his right-arm medium-fast bowling at an average of 19.41, including two five wicket hauls. His best bowling came against the touring South Africans at Southampton in 1907, taking 7 for 35 in the South Africans first innings. In 31 first-class appearances for Hampshire, he scored 334 runs at a batting average of 9.54, while with the ball he took 33 wickets at an average of 22.21.

Smoker left Hampshire at the end of the 1907 season to become the professional at New Brighton Cricket Club of the Liverpool Competition for the 1908 season. Beginning in 1909, he began playing Minor Counties Cricket for Cheshire, making his debut in the Minor Counties Championship against Staffordshire. Before the First World War, he played in the Lancashire League for Colne in 1912 and 1913. During the war, he served in the British Army as a sergeant with the Royal Field Artillery on the Western Front. Following the war, he returned to minor counties cricket with Cheshire, for whom he played for until 1925.

== Later life ==
After retiring from playing, he became groundsman and cricket coach at Birkenhead School in 1930, a position he held until 1960. Smoker died at Wallasey in September 1966. He was married to the sister of Victor Norbury, who also played cricket for Hampshire and football for Southampton.
