= Neil Dansie =

Australian cricketer (1928–2023)

Neil Dansie OAM
Personal information
- Full name: Hampton Neil Dansie
- Born: 2 July 1928; Nuriootpa, South Australia, Australia
- Died: 23 May 2023 (aged 94); Adelaide, South Australia, Australia
- Batting: Right-handed
- Bowling: Right-arm leg-break

Domestic team information
- Years: Team
- 1949/50–1966/67: South Australia

Career statistics
Competition	First-class
Matches	124
Runs scored	7,543
Batting average	34.44
100s/50s	18/36
Top score	185
Balls bowled	6,188
Wickets	90
Bowling average	33.31
5 wickets in innings	1
10 wickets in match	0
Best bowling	5/61
Catches/stumpings	49/-
- Source: Cricinfo, 24 May 2023

Hampton Neil Dansie OAM (2 July 1928 – 23 May 2023) was an Australian first-class cricketer and long-term administrator for South Australia. He is the seventh leading run-scorer for South Australia in Sheffield Shield.

== Early life ==
Nicknamed "Nodder" due to his habit of nodding in agreement when in conversation, Dansie was born in Nuriootpa, South Australia, the grandson of Sam Dansie, a leading country cricketer who represented a Broken Hill team against the touring Marylebone Cricket Club side. Dansie moved to Adelaide with his family as a child and excelled in a wide range of sports, including cricket, Australian rules football and baseball. He made his first grade cricket debut for Kensington Cricket Club aged 15, one of the youngest ever debutants in the South Australian Grade Cricket League. His football career also developed, making his senior debut for Norwood Football Club in the South Australian National Football League (SANFL) in 1946. Dansie played 39 games for Norwood before retiring in 1949, aged just 21, in order to concentrate on his cricket career.

In January 1949, Dansie was the last player to bat with Don Bradman in an official match, when Bradman played his final innings for Kensington against Port Adelaide Cricket Club at Alberton Oval. When Bradman was given out caught behind on 38, the large crowd booed the umpire and promptly adjourned to the neighbouring Alberton Hotel.

== First-class cricket ==
Dansie made his first-class cricket debut on 27 January 1950 on the WACA Ground against Western Australia, making 36 and 13. Dansie quickly gained a reputation as a hard-hitting batsman with a liking for the pull, sweep and cut shots and a steady off-spin and leg-spin bowler, as well as being known as one of the great characters of South Australian cricket, including gaining the title of being the world's fastest eater. Dansie's best batting performance was 185 against Queensland at the Gabba in January 1951 and took five wickets for 61 against Queensland in December 1960. During his final Sheffield Shield season, he showed his all-round prowess once again with the bat and ball taking 26 scalps and scoring 405 runs which also included a century against Queensland during Boxing Day match in 1966.

He became only the second player to reach milestone of 100 Sheffield Shield appearances after Ken Mackay and he achieved the feat in 1966. He had a prolific run for South Australia in first-class cricket scoring 6692 runs which accounted for more than 3/4th of his total first-class runs. His total tally of 6692 runs in 107 first-class matches puts him only behind Darren Lehmann, Greg Blewett, David Hookes, Callum Ferguson, Les Favell and Ian Chappell in the list of all-time top runscorers for South Australia in Sheffield Shield history.

Despite being touted as one of the brightest prospects in Australian domestic setup, he never received a Baggy Green Cap. He was touted by many as a potential test match prospect throughout the 1950s.

== Lancashire League ==
In 1955, Dansie signed with Lancashire League club Todmorden (for £550) on the advice of former Australian Test cricketer and Bacup Cricket Club professional Arthur Richardson. In his first season Dansie made 800 runs and took 44 wickets. Re-signed by Todmorden for the 1956 season, Dansie remained in England in 1955–56 and worked at Alf Gover's indoor cricket centre, coaching children who hadn't played cricket before, experience which Dansie later used as a coach in South Australia. In the 1956 Lancashire League season Dansie made 713 runs and took 67 wickets. A popular figure in Todmorden, Dansie was offered another contract but, having married Gwenda, Dansie returned to South Australia.

== Cricket administration ==
Dansie retired from first-class cricket in 1967, after 124 matches and was awarded honorary membership of the South Australian Cricket Association. Following his retirement, Dansie turned to coaching and administration, coaching the Norwood reserves, South Australian Amateur Football League (SAAFL) team Payneham, the SAAFL state team and the All-Australian amateur team. Additionally, Dansie and his wife founded the Newton Jaguars Netball Club.

In 1976 Dansie was made a selector for the South Australian senior cricket side and all its under-age and women's teams, serving for 30 years. Dansie also served on the SACA board for 25 years, on the City of Campbelltown council and as president of the Australian Sportsmen's Association. Dansie also found time to work for the South Australian Education Department, including many years as the bursar at Norwood Morialta High School.

== Later life and honours ==
Dansie was known as "The Patriarch of South Australian cricket", and the Neil Dansie Trophy for South Australia's most valuable player each season is named in his honour. He and his former teammate Les Favell are honoured in the Favell-Dansie Indoor Centre at the southern end of Adelaide Oval, behind the Sir Donald Bradman Stand. In the 1991 Australia Day Honours, he was awarded the Order of Australia Medal (OAM) for services to sport.

Dansie died in Adelaide on 23 May 2023, at the age of 94.
