= Murali Kartik =

Indian cricketer (born 1976)

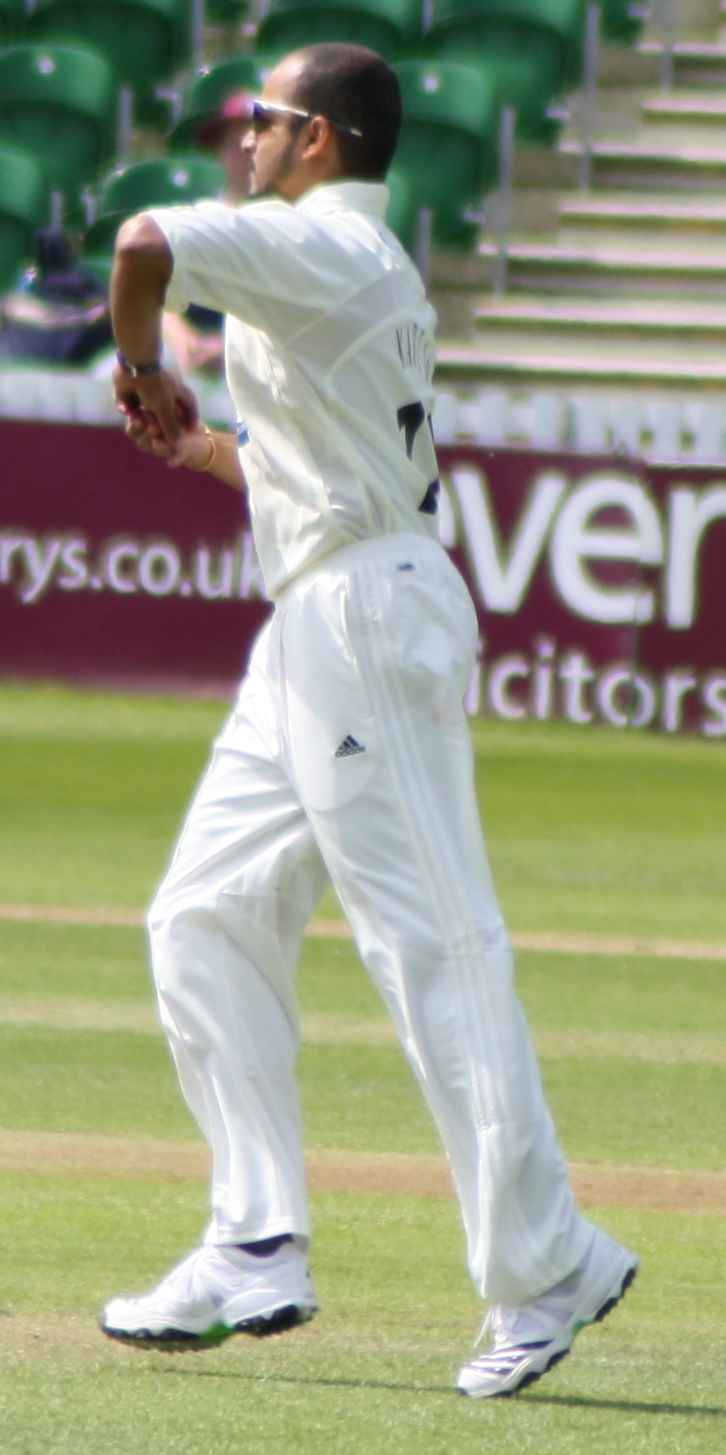
- Kartik bowling for Somerset in 2010.

Personal information
- Born: 11 September 1976 (age 50); Madras, Tamil Nadu, India
- Height: 6 ft 0 in (1.83 m)
- Batting: Left-handed
- Bowling: Slow left arm orthodox
- Role: Bowler

International information
- National side: India (2000–2007)
- Test debut (cap 226): 24 February 2000 v South Africa
- Last Test: 20 November 2004 v South Africa
- ODI debut (cap 144): 16 March 2002 v Zimbabwe
- Last ODI: 18 November 2007 v Pakistan
- Only T20I (cap 19): 20 October 2007 v Australia

Domestic team information
- Years: Team
- 1996–2014: Railways
- 2005–2006: Lancashire
- 2007–2009: Middlesex
- 2008–2010: Kolkata Knight Riders
- 2010–2011: Somerset
- 2011–2012: Pune Warriors India
- 2012: Surrey
- 2013: Royal Challengers Bangalore (squad no. 222)
- 2014: Kings XI Punjab

Career statistics
Competition	Test	ODI	FC	LA
Matches	8	37	203	194
Runs scored	88	126	4,423	773
Batting average	9.77	14.00	20.19	11.89
100s/50s	0/0	0/0	0/21	0/0
Top score	43	32*	96	44
Balls bowled	1,932	1,907	42,547	9,619
Wickets	24	37	644	249
Bowling average	34.16	43.56	26.70	28.29
5 wickets in innings	0	1	36	2
10 wickets in match	0	0	5	0
Best bowling	4/44	6/27	9/70	6/27
Catches/stumpings	2/–	10/–	143/–	66/–
- Source: ESPNcricinfo, 14 June 2014

Murali Kartik (born 11 September 1976) is an Indian cricket commentator and former cricketer who sporadically represented the national team from 2000 to 2007. He was a slow left-arm orthodox bowler. He was not selected for international matches during his prime years due to the presence of Anil Kumble and Harbhajan Singh in the Indian squad. A left-handed batsman who had some success with the bat at first-class level with 21 half-centuries, Murli was not able to repeat such performances at international level.

After starting out in the Delhi junior system, Murali moved through the age group ranks at Railways and was selected for the Indian Under-19 team. He made his first-class debut in 1996–97 and after a few productive seasons at the domestic level, made his Test debut in early 2000 as Kumble's bowling partner. However, he ran into disciplinary problems and was expelled from the National Cricket Academy in the same year. At the same time, new national captain Sourav Ganguly was reluctant to entrust him with responsibility. Ganguly called for off-spinner Harbhajan Singh to be recalled in 2001 and was rewarded with a series-winning performance against Australia. This entrenched the off-spinner in the team and left Kartik on the outer.

For the next four years, Kartik was on the fringes of selection. He made his ODI debut in 2002. However a series of disappointing performances lead to him missing the 2003 Cricket World Cup. He was recalled in late 2003 for limited overs matches and played in approximately half of India's matches over six months, as well as one Test after Harbhajan suffered a serious injury. In late 2004, Kartik played in three Tests as India fielded three spinners and claimed his only man-of-the-match award in Tests against Australia in Mumbai, but was again dropped two matches later. In late 2005, Murali became a regular member of the ODI team for a few months when the International Cricket Council introduced an experimental rule that allowed one substitute to be used, opening an extra vacancy in the national team. However, Kartik was unable to secure his position in the team and the rule was later revoked. In late 2007, Kartik broke back into the ODI team and took 6/27 in one victory over Australia, but lost form soon after and was again dropped. He has not represented India since then.

Aside from domestic cricket, Kartik played for Royal Challengers Bangalore in the Indian Premier League and has been in demand in English county cricket as an overseas player, representing Lancashire, Middlesex, Somerset and Surrey.

Kartik has been part of the IPL commentary team since 2015 and regularly commentates on the Indian national team's home games.

== Early life ==
Born on 11 September 1976 in Madras, Tamil Nadu, Murali Kartik wanted to be a genetic engineer. He was a medium pacer in his early years before switching to a left-arm finger spinner in the classical mould. Kartik grew up trying to emulate past Indian orthodox spinners Bishen Singh Bedi, Maninder Singh and Venkatapathy Raju. He also garnered attention for what was perceived to be a fiery attitude. Still, he took pride in coach Kapil Dev, saying of him, "I have never seen a player with such an attitude towards the game in my 20 years of international cricket".

Kartik started out in the junior system at Delhi. He broke into their Under-16 team in December 1992 and took a match total of 10/74 on debut against Himachal Pradesh, and scored 52 not out in an innings victory. He took 2/91 in the next match against Haryana but could no longer play in the Under-16s because of his advancing age. He could not break into the Under-19s at Delhi and played no further youth domestic matches for two years before transferring to Railways and breaking into their Under-19 team.

In five matches for his new team during 1994–95, he took 24 wickets at an average of 14.58, including a five-wicket haul (5/28) against Vidarbha. He was rewarded for his performance with a selection into the Under-19 Central Zone team for the zonal one-day tournament, taking five wickets at an average of 25.00 in four matches. He had little success with the bat, scoring 47 on one occasion during the season, but otherwise only aggregating nine runs in six innings.

The following season in 1995–96, Murali had a more successful season for Railways Under-19s. He started with 5/73 and 5/55 against Madhya Pradesh and made it three five-wicket hauls in a row with 5/42 against Vidarbha. He took another five-wicket haul later in the season against Rajasthan and ended the competition with 38 wickets at 18.94 in seven matches. Railways made the final, where they faced Punjab. Murali was Railways' most effective bowler, taking 4/57 in Punjab's first innings of 310. He then made 14 not out as Railways ceded a first-innings lead, which was enough to give Punjab the title as the match ended in a draw. Kartik took 3/138 in the second innings. After the final, the newly crowned champions took on the Rest of India, and Kartik took 2/25 and 4/89 to help his team to a six-wicket victory. Kartik had a less successful time in the zonal one-dayers for Central, taking only one wicket in three matches. He also improved his batting marginally, scoring 57 and three other double-digit scores.

As a result of his performances during the season, Kartik was called up to the Indian Under-19 team for an international series against South Africa. In the youth Test, he took 4/40 as India dismissed South Africa for 159 to take a 19-run lead. In the second innings, he took 3/30 as South Africa fell for 107 in pursuit of 277. In two youth one-day internationals that followed, Kartik was prominent in the Indian victories, taking 3/23 and 3/33, respectively.

== Domestic career ==
The following season, 1996–97, Kartik was promoted into the senior ranks. In his first match, a List A fixture against Madhya Pradesh, Kartik took 2/27 from ten overs but was unable to prevent a four-wicket loss. He made his first-class debut the next day against the same team and bowled 16 overs, taking a total of 1/18 in a drawn match. In a closely contested match, Madhya Pradesh were 8/89 and 17 runs short with two wickets in hand when time ran out. Kartik had scored a rearguard 47 in the second innings, without which Madhya Pradesh would have won. In his next first-class match, against Vidarbha, he took a hat-trick in the first innings, ending with 6/28, helping to bowl Vidarbha out for 130. He then took 3/27 in the second innings as Vidarbha made only 95 to cede victory to Railways. He ended the season with 16 wickets at 19.37 and 185 runs at 20.55, including a 74 against Bengal. Still, he was overlooked for the Central Zone selection for the Duleep Trophy after taking only six wickets in his last four matches for the season. In four one-day matches for Railways, Kartik took seven wickets at 12.42, including a match-winning 4/13 against Rajasthan.

The following season, he managed 14 wickets at 18.42 in four matches but was dropped in the later stages of the tournament. After taking a match total of 7/74 in helping to orchestrate an innings victory over Rajasthan in his third match of the season, Kartik went wicketless in the next match against Madhya Pradesh and was dropped. He scored 70 runs at 23.33 during the tournament. In four one-dayers for Railways, he took four wickets at 29.75 at an economy rate of 3.30. Despite being dropped by Railways, Kartik was called up to make his senior debut for Central Zone. He took two wickets at 63.00 in two first-class matches and then took three wickets at 43.00 at an economy rate of 4.30 in three matches.

Despite the modest returns during the season, Kartik was selected for an India A tour of Pakistan in February and March 1998. In four first-class matches, which were persistently curtailed by the weather, Kartik bowled only 31 overs and only two in the two matches against Pakistan A. He finished with four wickets at 27.50. In the two one-dayers, he proved expensive, taking 1/53 and 0/73 from ten overs each, as Pakistan won both matches easily.

At the start of the 1998–99 season, Kartik took 23 wickets for Vijay Cricket Club in the Chennai League. He played more regularly in the 1998–99 Ranji Trophy, taking 29 wickets in seven matches at 19.3 to be the 13th-highest wicket-taker. This included a 3/8 and 4/62 in an innings win over Rajasthan and 5/84 and 5/55 in the last two matches of the campaign against Tamil Nadu and Delhi. He also added 29 and 53 with the bat against Tamil Nadu to help stave off a defeat after they were trailing by over 200 in the first innings.

He was rewarded with selection for Central Zone and, after taking 4/133 against North Zone, claimed 5/73 and 2/22 in the final to help them defeat West Zone by 112 runs in Aurangabad to claim the Duleep Trophy and was the leading wicket-taker during the tournament. He scored a total of 183 runs at 18.30 for the entire Indian first-class season. He took five wickets at 26.60 in four zonal one-dayers, winning all four matches.

== International career ==
=== Early international career ===
Kartik had a truncated but productive 1999–2000 Indian season. After taking a solitary wicket in a truncated match for India A against the touring New Zealand, Kartik snared 6/62 and 6/31 against Vidarbha. He then went on an India A tour to the West Indies, so his only other first-class match was a Ranji Trophy encounter against Rajasthan, in which he took 4/53. In four first-class matches in the Caribbean, Kartik took 18 wickets at 16.38. This included two matches against West Indies A, in which he took 6/75 before claiming 3/64 and 5/73 in the second match, although he was unable to force a victory in either. In two one-day matches against West Indies, Kartik took two wickets at 26.00 at an economy rate of 3.46. Returning to India, he took 12 wickets at 13.08 in five matches for Railways and the Indian Board president's XI before playing in the zonal one-dayers with less success, managing only two wickets at 91.50 at an economy rate of 4.57. Despite these struggles, he was selected for the India A team for the Challenger Trophy, where he took four wickets at 38.00 at an expensive economy rate of 5.84.

Despite the downturn in his limited overs fortunes towards the end of the season, Kartik's form was enough to earn him selection in the Indian Board president's XI for the tour match against the visiting South Africans before the Tests. He had a match total of 2/122, which was enough for him to secure national selection, playing in both Tests against South Africa in early 2000 at Mumbai and Bangalore as India sought a second spinner to accompany Anil Kumble after Harbhajan Singh's performance in the role the previous season had been deemed inadequate. Kartik scored 14 before being bowled by Shaun Pollock as India batted first and made 225. He then took 2/28 from 18 overs as India restricted the tourists to 176 before collapsing to be all out for 113 in the second innings. Kartik scored only two runs before being caught behind by Pollock. Kartik took 1/50 in the second innings as South Africa ground their way to the target of 163 with four wickets in hand. In the second Test, Kartik took 3/123 and scored a duck and two as India was crushed by an innings. Overall, Kartik performed steadily, taking six wickets at 33.50.

Kartik was selected in 2000 for the first intake of the National Cricket Academy in Bangalore, after earlier having made his Test debut in early 2000 in a home series against South Africa. However, his stay was cut short along with that of Harbhajan, when they were expelled by the director Hanumant Singh over disciplinary issues.

In the 2000–01 season, Kartik started in fine form as he set out to maintain a Test position. In the Irani Trophy, the traditional season opener between the reigning Ranji champions—Mumbai—and the Rest of India, Kartik orchestrated the defeat of the title-holders. After taking 4/73 in Mumbai's 260, Kartik scored 22 in Rest of India's total of 389. He then took 9/70 to cut down Mumbai for 184, and his batting colleagues accumulated the 55 needed for victory without loss. Kartik then took 3/82 and 1/45 against Madhya Pradesh to secure his spot in the Test team.

Kartik then played in one Test against Bangladesh and Zimbabwe, respectively, in India, taking match totals of 1/42 and 2/66. He scored 43 in the nine-wicket win over Bangladesh but did not bat in the seven-wicket win over Zimbabwe. New captain Sourav Ganguly—who had taken over after Sachin Tendulkar resigned following the South African whitewash—did not show much confidence in him, only giving him short but frequent spells. Kartik was dropped from the team after the first Test against Zimbabwe. In the one-day domestic circuit, Kartik took nine wickets at 25.22 at an economy rate of 4.02, giving himself a chance for a Test recall in the Duleep Trophy.

In the Duleep Trophy, Kartik struggled, taking 2/129 against East and then 0/178 in the first innings as North Zone accumulated 8/690 declared. He then had to endure the humiliation of not being trusted to bowl in the second innings as North reached 8/233. In the last match against South, Kartik could only aggregate 1/87. Although Kartik had scored 45 and 27 in his two innings, he totalled only three Duleep Trophy wickets at an average of 131.33. The selectors were unsatisfied with these performances, and despite a shoulder injury to Kumble, Kartik was overlooked as India hosted Australia in the 2001 Border–Gavaskar Trophy. Harbhajan was recalled and took 32 wickets at 17 to engineer an Indian series win and permanently establish himself as India's leading spinner alongside Kumble. Kartik played in one more match for Railways at the end of the season, and his poor season continued, managing only a total of 2/152, although he did score 79 with the bat.

Kartik started the new 2001–02 season well, taking 20 wickets at 15.40 in the first four first-class matches of the season, including five-wicket hauls against Rajasthan and Vidarbha and 3/84 against the touring English Test team for a Board president's XI, but this was not enough for the selectors to recall him for Tests. He continued his form for Railways in the one-dayers, taking seven wickets at 20.57 in four matches at an economy rate of 4.00 before suffering a serious back injury that forced him to travel to Adelaide for treatment, which was funded by the Board of Control for Cricket in India. He made a successful comeback in January after a month-long layoff. He ended as fourth-highest wicket taker in-the Ranji Trophy, with 34 at an average of 17, taking 5/51 and 3/7 and scoring 69 in his final match of the season to secure a win over Baroda. He batted well in the second half of the season, scoring 42 and 58. He also performed well in the Challenger Trophy and zonal one-dayers after his surgery, taking ten wickets at 21.70 in seven matches. At the end of the season, Kartik was rewarded with his debut in One Day Internationals (ODIs); where he conceded 47 runs without a wicket from eight overs against the Zimbabwean batsmen; however, India won by five wickets.

=== Support role ===
Since then, Kartik was India's third choice Test spinner behind Kumble and Harbhajan for most of the decade, only playing when they were injured or when India selected three spinners. At the end of the 2001–02 season, Kartik was selected for an India A tour of South Africa. He struggled in the first two matches, before taking 6/101 and scoring 59 in the second match against South Africa A to end the three games with ten wickets at 32.50. He had more success in the one-dayers, taking four wickets at 17.50 at an economy rate of 2.50 in three matches.

The West Indies toured India at the start of the 2002–03 season and Kartik had a chance to press his claims for Test selection in two tour matches against the visitors. However, he had little impact, taking 2/92 for the Board president's XI and 0/117 for Railways against the Caribbean tourists, although he scored 72 with the bat in the latter match. He then took a total of 2/135 as Railways, the reigning Ranji Trophy holders, defeated the Rest of India in the Irani Trophy. With these lean returns, Kartik was overlooked for the Tests.

Kartik had opportunities in the ODI format following his strong form in domestic limited overs matches, playing in four consecutive matches against the West Indies. After going wicketless in the first of these matches, he broke through in the next match to take his maiden ODI wicket in his third appearance. Kartik then took 3/36 in the next match as India scraped home by three wickets, but in his fourth outing of the series, he conceded 69 runs in nine overs without a wicket, after which he was dropped. He had taken four wickets at 47.25, at an economy rate of 4.84.

Kartik was called into the Test squad to tour New Zealand in late 2002 after Kumble withdrew, but in the warm-up match he bowled one only over, in which he was hammered for 23 runs. He then watched from the sidelines as India only fielded one spin bowler—Harbhajan—in the Tests, held on green, pace-friendly surfaces. Kartik returned to India and was ineffective in the zonal one-dayers, taking a total of 1/148 from 24 overs in three matches, conceding more than a run a ball. Combined with his results against the West Indies, the poor returns saw him left out of the 2003 Cricket World Cup squad, with Harbhajan and Kumble preferred.

While the World Cup was in progress, Kartik toured the West Indies with India A, playing against the domestic teams in five first-class matches. He took 14 wickets at 30.50 including a 5/105 against Barbados and 4/57 against Trinidad and Tobago. India A then toured England during the northern hemisphere summer and Kartik took 10 wickets at 40.00 and scored 79 runs at 26.33 including a 50 in four first-class matches, and three wickets at 44.33 in one-dayers.

At the start of the 2003–04 season, Kartik took 2/118 and 2/41 for India A in a match against the touring New Zealanders, and was overlooked for the Test series against the visitors. He managed only a total of 1/84 from 18 overs in the Challenger Trophy but was called into the ODI team and gained semi-regular appearances during the TVS Trophy against New Zealand and Australia, competing with Kumble and Harbhajan for a regular position in the team. In four matches during the competition, he was economical although not very penetrative, taking four wickets at 38.25 at an economy rate of 3.82.

=== Occasional international appearances in 2004 and 2005 ===
After taking match figures of 6/117 and 5/140 for India A against Sri Lanka A, Kartik made his first overseas appearance for India, replacing the injured Harbhajan midway through the 2003–04 tour of Australia. He had little success in his first tour match, taking 1/64 and 1/53 against Australia A. He played in the final Test at the Sydney Cricket Ground when India fielded two spinners for the only time in the series. He was punished by the Australian batsmen, taking a total of 1/211 from 45 overs, a run rate of 4.68 in a high-scoring draw.

Kartik then made sporadic appearances in the VB triangular ODI series, playing in four of India's ten matches, as he and Kumble were brought in and out of the team in an attempt to challenge the Australian superiority. He continued to be punished by the Australian batsmen, taking a total of 1/178 from 26 overs, an economy rate of 6.84. However, he did manage to resist the Australians with the bat; in his only two innings he made 32 not out and 23 as the Indian batting was dismissed for only 203 and 151 respectively.

Despite these performances, Kartik was retained for the ODI tour of Pakistan with Harbhajan still injured, taking five wickets at 32.80 at an economy of 5.46. He played in three of the five matches and India won all of these. Kartik was also in the Test squad, but did not play a match as India opted to field only Kumble and won the series 2–1.

Kartik started the 2004–05 season by scoring 56 and 16 and taking 2/42 and 2/49 as Rest of India defeated Mumbai in the Irani Trophy, but it was not enough to prevent Harbhajan from resuming his position in the team for the home Test series against Australia. He got an opportunity in the Third Test in Nagpur, when Harbhajan was ill, taking 3/57 and 2/74 as India lost by 342 runs to lose their first home series to Australia since 1969–70. Kartik held his place when Harbhajan returned for the final Test in Mumbai as India fielded three spinners, and took 4/44 and 3/32 in a man of the match performance which saw India win by 13 runs. Both of these performances occurred under the captaincy of Rahul Dravid with Ganguly injured, in which Kartik netted his wickets at an average of 17.50 compared to 51.08 under Ganguly's leadership. Kartik played the last of his eight Tests in a subsequent opening match against South Africa in Kanpur, taking a total of 2/93 under Ganguly's command, only to be dropped after India chose to only use two spinners in the subsequent matches. Kartik spent the next month watching from the sidelines as the reserve slow bowler, as only Kumble and Harbhajan played during the tour of Bangladesh. During this campaign, he played the second ODI, taking 2/43 as India lost to Bangladesh for the first time. Kartik returned to India and took seven wickets at 35.42 at an economy rate of 4.69 in the zonal one-dayers and Challenger Trophy, and then played four first-class matches to end the season, taking 10 wickets at 19.10. At the end of the season, he took 2/54 in a home ODI against Pakistan, who scored 7/319 to overhaul the target.

He enjoyed more opportunities in the ODI arena in 2005, when Kumble was dropped by newly appointed coach Greg Chappell due to his lack of athleticism, as well as the introduction of the experimental rules which allowed the use of one substitute, thus opening an extra position in the team. Kartik had a modest start under the new regime, taking 1/52 from nine overs in a win over a depleted host Zimbabwe team. He returned to India and started the new season in fine all-round form. After taking 2/34 in the first innings, he scored his highest first-class score of 96 to guide Railways to 311, giving them a first-innings lead of 88 runs over Rest of India in the Irani Trophy. He then took 3/28 to dismiss Rest of India for 137 in their second innings, setting up a nine-wicket win. He then took seven wickets at 16.85 at an economy rate of 4.56 in three matches for India Seniors in the Challenger Trophy, including a match-winning 5/29 in the final against India B.

Kartik was thus selected in the Indian ODI team for the home summer, and played in ten of the twelve ODIs that India hosted in late 2005. He started well with 3/48 in a 152-run crushing of Sri Lanka in Nagpur, and went on to finish the series with eight wickets at 30.25, playing in six of the seven matches. However, his form dissipated and he went wicketless in the South African series, conceding 126 runs in 28 overs, and giving away more than a run a ball in the last two matches. Kumble remained in favour for the Tests along with Harbhajan, and Kartik returned to Ranji competition while they bowled against Sri Lanka in the five-dayers. Kartik took 5/95 against Mumbai and then 8/40 against Delhi, and in three Ranji Trophy matches took 17 wickets at 19.94.

Despite his ineffectiveness against South Africa, Kartik was retained in the ODI squad, but after conceding 64 runs from nine overs in the first ODI loss against Pakistan, he was replaced in early-2006 in the Test and ODI squad by 17-year-old leg-spinner Piyush Chawla and off-spinner Ramesh Powar respectively.

=== County career ===
In late 2006, India's ODI team began to hit rocky waters. After losing a bilateral series in the West Indies due to his poor performance, they were knocked out of a triangular tournament in Malaysia ahead of the finals, and were eliminated in the first round of the 2006 ICC Champions Trophy on home soil. Kartik took four wickets at 34.00 and an economy rate of 5.36 in the Challenger Trophy and could not earn a recall. He had a steady domestic first-class season, taking 26 wickets at 25.53 in nine matches, never taking more than five wickets in a match. He took 13 wickets at 27.92 in eight one-day matches for the season, and was overlooked as Kumble and Harbhajan were the spinners selected for the 2007 Cricket World Cup. India were knocked out in the first round after losing to Bangladesh, and Harbhajan was dropped while Kumble retired from ODIs, but Kartik did not do enough to persuade the selectors to hand him a recall.

In 2004, Kartik played in the Lancashire League with Ramsbottom as their professional. In 19 games, he took 80 wickets at 9.92 and scored 464 runs at 25.77. He scored three fifties with a best of 83 against Colne and took nine five-wicket innings hauls including a best of 9/30 against Enfield in addition to two other matches in which he took seven wickets.

In 2005, he returned to Ramsbottom as their professional for a second season, with more effect. He took 83 wickets at 9.19 and scored 519 runs at 37.07 in 20 matches. He scored five fifties including a best of 66, and took eight five-wicket innings hauls including a best of 9/47 against Church as well as 7/27 against Lowerhouse. These performances earned him notice, and in late 2005, he appeared as a late-season overseas player substitute for Lancashire, and became the first overseas Lancashire player to take ten wickets on their debut, with 10/168 against Essex. This 5/93 and 5/75 helped Lancashire to an eight-wicket win, and in his only other first-class match, he took 4/43 and 2/4, which was not enough as the Roses went down to Leicestershire by four runs. His sixteen wickets at 16.25 placed him second on the season's bowling averages, and helped the team to be promoted from Second Division. In two one-day games, Kartik took five wickets at 13.40.

Despite these performances, he was not initially offered a contract for 2006. Eventually in August 2006, he was again signed as a late-season overseas player for Lancashire just in time to appear in the C&G Trophy final against Sussex, taking 2/28 and scoring a duck in a 15-run defeat. He took eight wickets at 17.25 in four one-dayers, and six wickets at 39.00 in three first-class matches with a best of 3/89, as well a 40 with the bat against Hampshire.

In 2007, he joined Middlesex as an overseas registration. He made his debut as the county club's 700th first-class cricketer against Somerset at Taunton in April 2007. He took 51 wickets at 24.96 in 12 matches and agreed to sign on for a further season in 2008. A highlight of Kartik's stint was a haul of 6/21 and 3/52 that helped set up an innings win over Glamorgan, and 6/85 and 3/83 that secured a 38-run win over Leicestershire. A third five-wicket haul, 5/38 against Derbyshire, was not enough to prevent a 15-run defeat. With the bat, Kartik contributed 209 runs at 19.00 with a best of 35. Kartik was also prolific for his new county in the one-dayers, taking 21 wickets at 23.52 in 15 matches, taking three wickets in a match twice, both of which resulted in wins. During the T20 tournament, Kartik took nine wickets at 10.77 and an economy rate of 5.70, including a haul of 5/13 in a vain attempt to halt an Essex run-chase.

=== Brief international return and later career ===
In late 2007, Kartik was recalled to the ODI team in place of the struggling Powar midway through the series against Australia. He played his first ODI in 18 months when he returned for the fourth match at Mohali. He took 1/48, and conceded only two runs in the 48th over as Australia stumbled in a tight run chase to give India their first win of the series.

Kartik took only one wicket in the next two matches, which Australia won. In the seventh and final match, Kartik took a career best of 6/27 from 10 overs at the Wankhede Stadium in Mumbai to bowl Australia out for 193. The tourists had reached 2/117 after 19.4 overs, scoring at over six runs and over before Kartik removed Brad Hodge and Andrew Symonds from consecutive balls. He failed to get his hat-trick, but in the 32nd over he removed Brad Haddin from the first ball, and then Brad Hogg and Brett Lee from the fourth and fifth balls. Again Kartik missed the hat-trick opportunity, but returned to claim his six wicket. In reply, India had fallen to 8/143 before Kartik chipped in with an unbeaten 21 from 34 balls in an unbroken 52-run stand with Zaheer Khan, guiding India to a two-wicket victory. Kartik was recognised as the man of the match. Kartik then made his T20 international debut, taking 0/27 from four overs in an Indian win over Australia.

In the following series against Pakistan, Kartik was only selected in the first, third and fifth matches, and took two wickets at an average of 68.00 at an economy rate of 5.23. As a result, Kartik was omitted from the ODI tour of Australia in favour of Chawla.

Due to his international commitments, Kartik made only sporadic appearances during the Indian domestic scene in 2007–08. He took nine wickets at 44.22 and scored 77 runs at 19.25 in three first-class fixtures. After being dropped from India's limited-overs team, Kartik continued his strong one-day form at domestic level, taking six wickets at 25.33 at an economy rate of only 3.16 in six matches.

Kartik was purchased by the Kolkata Knight Riders in the inaugural 2008 Indian Premier League. He played in six matches, taking three wickets at 42.33, but was dropped because his economy rate was beyond eight runs an over. All of these came in one match in which he took 3/17.

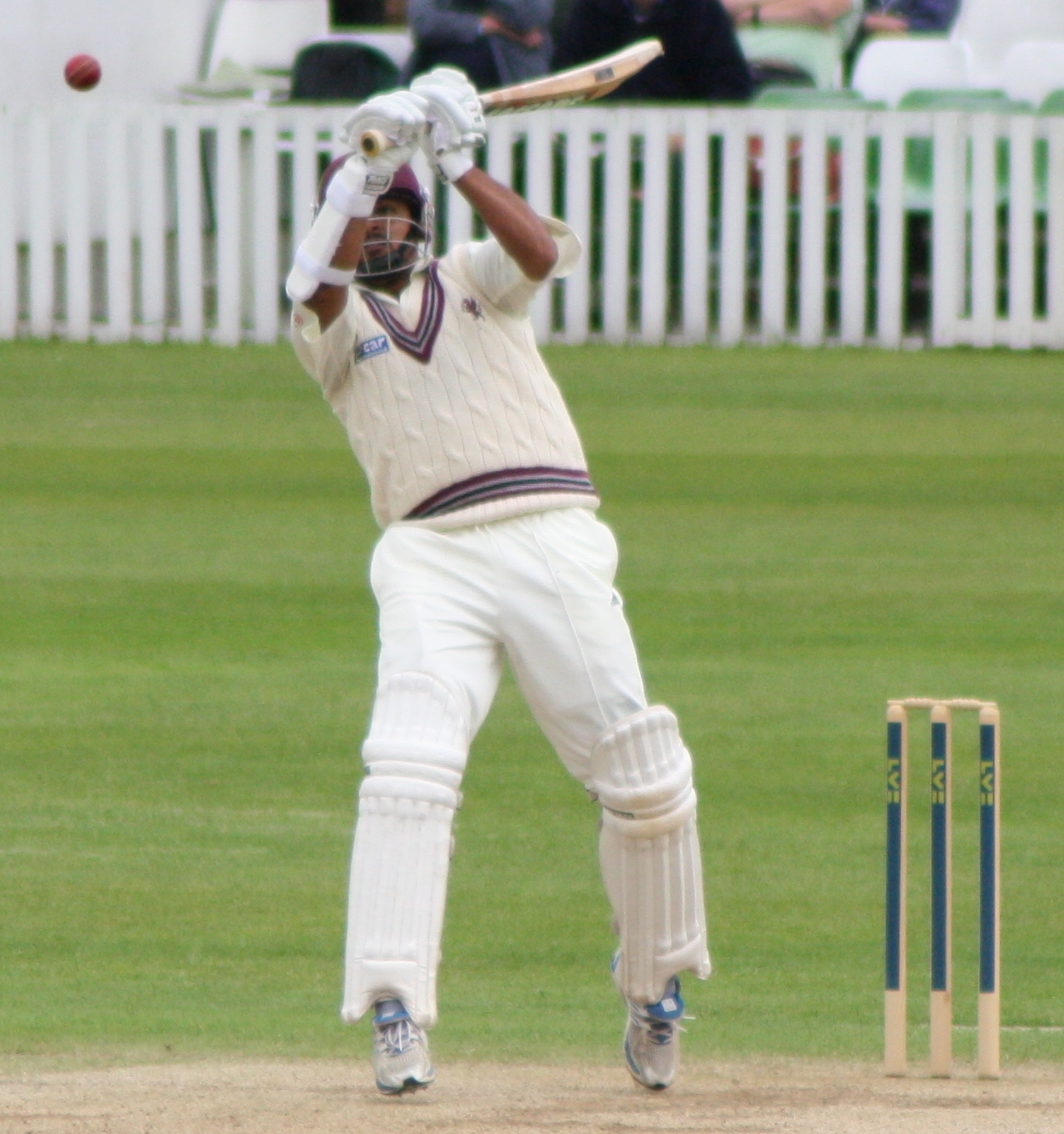
Kartik playing an unorthodox shot for Somerset in 2010.

Kartik was part of the Middlesex team that won the 2008 Twenty20 Cup in England, their first domestic title for 15 years. He played in 11 matches and took 14 wickets at 20.14 at an economy rate of 6.71, claiming at least one wicket in all but one of the matches. Kartik represented Middlesex in the Stanford competition in October, taking two wickets at 25.50 at an economy rate of 6.37.

His second first-class season with Middlesex was much less successful than the first; Kartik took only 16 wickets at 34.06 in seven matches, with a best of 4/101 against Derbyshire. He scored 161 runs at 20.12 with a best of 44 against Warwickshire. His one-day form was also lean, yielding six wickets at 33.00 in six matches.

Kartik returned to India and took 16 wickets at 32.75 in six matches for Railways in the Ranji Trophy. After taking 5/85 in the first innings of the season opener against Karnataka, his performances fell away and he managed only four wickets in his last three matches. Nevertheless, he was selected for Central Zone in the Duleep Trophy and took a total of 2/98 as they lost on first innings to South and were eliminated after one match. Kartik made his contribution with the bat, scoring 197 runs at 24.62 for the season, including a score of 56 against Maharashtra and two other efforts of 30. Playing for both Railways and Central, Kartik took 12 wickets at 23.50 in the one-day matches for the season. He also scored 65 runs at 13.00.

During the 2009 IPL season, which was held in South Africa, Kartik played in ten matches and took four wickets at 50.25, but he was one of the most economical bowlers, conceding only 5.91 runs per over. Kolkata were wracked by infighting and came last. Kartik also scored 21 runs not out. In the 2009 English season, Kartik resumed service for Middlesex, and as in the IPL he was most effective as a stock bowler, taking only four wickets at 51.50 in eight T20 fixtures at an economy rate of 6.86, never taking multiple wickets in a match. Middlesex, who had won the domestic title the previous year, only tasted victory in two of the Twenty20 matches that Kartik played in.

Kartik played in ten first-class matches for Middlesex, taking 33 wickets at 22.87. He took his season's innings best of 5/65 and then 2/26 in the season opener against cross-London rivals Surrey, and then took 3/32 and 4/53 in a hard-fought 47-run win over Kent, and a total of 6/139 in the next match against Essex, but his season fell away at the end, managing only six wickets in the last three matches. With the bat, he made 336 runs at 24.00, the most prolific season of his career with the willow, including 62 against Essex and 57 not out against Gloucestershire. He played in a solitary one-dayer, taking 2/19 against Northamptonshire.

At the end of the 2009 season, it was announced that Kartik would join Somerset as their overseas player for the 2010 season.

During the 2009–10 Indian season, Kartik played in seven matches for Railways in the Ranji Trophy, taking 17 wickets at 25.05 including a best of 5/81 against Mumbai. He also scored 44 against the team and ended with 97 runs at 12.12 for the season. However his figures were not enough to gain selection for Central Zone in the Duleep Trophy.

As of 2020, he is currently a cricket commentator, working on Star Sports coverage of India home games and the Indian Premier League. On 23 January 2026, before the second T20I between India and New Zealand at Raipur, Kartik was involved in a widely publicized exchange with Indian cricketer Hardik Pandya. A video showing the two in an animated discussion near the boundary line before the match went viral on social media. Despite the incident, Pandya went on to record figures of 1/25 during the match, contributing to India's seven-wicket victory.
