= J. Easby =

English cricketer

Personal information
- Full name: J. Easby
- Born: Unknown
- Batting: Unknown

Career statistics
Competition	First-class
Matches	1
Runs scored	13
Batting average	13.00
100s/50s	–/–
Top score	13
Catches/stumpings	2/–
- Source: Cricinfo, 31 March 2019

J. Easby (full name and dates of birth and death unknown) was an English first-class cricketer.

Easby made a single appearance in first-class cricket for the Players of the North against an England XI at Dewsbury in 1878. Batting once in the match, Easby was dismissed for 13 runs by Walter Gilbert in the Players first-innings.
