= Dick Horsfall =

English cricketer

Personal information
- Full name: Richard Horsfall
- Born: 26 June 1920; Todmorden, Yorkshire, England
- Died: 25 August 1981 (aged 61); Halifax, Yorkshire, England
- Batting: Right-handed
- Role: Batsman

Domestic team information
- Years: Team
- 1947–1955: Essex
- 1956: Glamorgan
- FC debut: 7 June 1947 Essex v Sussex
- Last FC: 22 May 1956 Glamorgan v Combined Services

Career statistics
Competition	First-class
Matches	214
Runs scored	9,777
Batting average	29.09
100s/50s	17/49
Top score	206
Balls bowled	72
Wickets	1
Bowling average	41.00
5 wickets in innings	0
10 wickets in match	0
Best bowling	1/4
Catches/stumpings	88/–
- Source: CricketArchive, 23 May 2010

Richard Horsfall (26 June 1920 – 25 August 1981) was an English cricketer, who played first-class cricket for Essex between 1947 and 1955, and then played for a single season for Glamorgan in 1956. He was a right-handed middle-order batsman.

Horsfall was born at Todmorden, Yorkshire. Having played Lancashire League cricket for Todmorden since 1936, Horsfall was recruited by Essex for the 1947 season and played in around half the team's first-class matches in his first season. In the game against Hampshire at Bournemouth, he scored 170, putting on 225 for the third wicket with Frank Vigar, who made 125. The following season, though he did not improve on his highest score, he played in every Essex County Championship match and made 1407 runs at an average of 31.97. He was awarded his county cap, and was also picked for a team representing the South of England which played the new county champions, Glamorgan, in an end of season game.

In 1949, Horsfall's cricket was affected for the first time by the back injury that would plague the rest of his career. He appeared in only six first-class matches, and though he returned to just over half of Essex's matches in 1950, his batting was less successful. His only century in these two seasons came in a match against the Combined Services. In 1951, however, he was fully fit and, playing in every Essex match, he made 1655 runs at an average of 35.21. His best score was 206, made in 270 minutes against Kent at Blackheath, and he shared a third wicket partnership of 343 with Paul Gibb which was the Essex county record until beaten by Mark Waugh and Nasser Hussain, who made an unbroken 347 against Lancashire in 1992. The 206 remained Horsfall's highest first-class score and was his only double-century.

The 1952 and 1953 seasons were equally successful. In 1952, Horsfall made 1560 runs at an average of 33.91 and the 1953 return was his best: 1731 runs at an average of 37.63 and including five centuries. In its reports on the two seasons, Wisden Cricketers' Almanack described Horsfall as "strong-driving"; he was a fast scorer throughout his career. The back injury returned, though, in 1954 and although he played regularly, he was not suited to slow pitches in a damp summer and his aggregate fell to 912 runs and an average of 21.20. Worse followed in 1955, with only 721 runs in 25 matches at an average of only 17.16, and at the end of the season he was not retained by Essex.

Horsfall was signed by Glamorgan for the 1956 season and made a promising start with an unbeaten 77 in a pre-season two-day friendly match against Gloucestershire. But when the first-class cricket started he was out of form and managed only 76 runs in nine innings. After five matches, he was dropped from the side and his contract was cancelled. He returned to Lancashire League cricket with Todmorden in the 1957 season.

Horsfall died at Halifax, Yorkshire, aged 61.
