= Victor Norbury =

English sportsperson (1887–1972)

Personal information
- Full name: Duncan Victor Norbury
- Born: 3 August 1887; Bartley, Hampshire, England
- Died: 23 October 1972 (aged 85); Sutton, Surrey, England
- Batting: Right-handed
- Bowling: Right-arm slow

Domestic team information
- Years: Team
- 1905–1906: Hampshire
- 1910–1913: Northumberland
- 1919–1922: Lancashire

Career statistics
Competition	First-class
Matches	26
Runs scored	806
Batting average	19.19
100s/50s	1/4
Top score	100
Balls bowled	1,737
Wickets	30
Bowling average	33.20
5 wickets in innings	–
10 wickets in match	–
Best bowling	4/28
Catches/stumpings	8/–
Source: Victor Norbury at Cricinfo
18 June 2009
Association football career
- Position: Full-back
Youth career
- Bartley
- Brockenhurst
Senior career*
Years	Team	Apps	(Gls)
1905–1907	Southampton	3	(0)
1907	Bartley Cross		
1908–????	North Shields		
- * Club domestic league appearances and goals

Duncan Victor Norbury (3 August 1887 – 23 October 1972) was an English sportsman who played football and first-class cricket. In football, Norbury most notably played in the Southern Football League for Southampton. His first-class cricket career had a greater longevity, with Norbury playing eitherside of the First World War for Hampshire and Lancashire. He had a prominent career as a professional cricketer in the North West of England playing in the Lancashire League, mostly with East Lancashire Cricket Club.

== Early life and sporting career ==
Norbury was born in August 1887 at Bartley, Hampshire. A product of Bartley Cricket Club, where he batted with success, Norbury made his debut in first-class cricket for Hampshire against Worcestershire at Worcester in the 1905 County Championship, with him making a further eight appearances that season. He followed these up with two appearances in the 1906 County Championship against Yorkshire and Leicestershire. In his eleven matches for Hampshire, he scored 179 runs at an average of 10.52, with a highest score of 35. With his slow bowling, he took 7 wickets with best figures of 2 for 48.

Concurrent to his first-class cricket with Hampshire, Norbury played football for Southampton as a full-back in the 1905–06 Southern Football League. Prior to playing for Southampton, he had played in the New Forest for Bartley and later Brockenhurst. Norbury spent most of his football career in the reserves, but made his debut for the first team as a replacement at left-back for Horace Glover away to Brentford on 29 September 1906. Norbury retained his place for the next match, in a 5–1 victory at home to Millwall. This was Southampton's first win of the season (having managed only two draws in their first five matches); despite this, Norbury lost his place back to Glover and made only one further first-team appearance, taking over from Jack Eastham at right-back at home to Clapton Orient on 16 February 1907. In the summer of 1907, he turned out for his local village team, Bartley Cross, but broke his leg, thus preventing him from playing cricket that summer.

== Move to the North of England ==
A professional cricketer, Norbury moved north in 1908 to play for as the professional for Backworth Cricket Club near Newcastle-upon-Tyne, where he was also their groundsman. In November 1908, he signed to play football for North Shields, having already played a trial match for Newcastle during that season. From 1910 to 1913, he was the professional for Northumberland in minor counties cricket, making 24 appearances in the Minor Counties Championship. Norbury left Backworth at the end of the 1911 season to join East Lancashire Cricket Club in the Lancashire League for the 1912 season, who he played for until the beginning of the First World War. Norbury served in the war, being commissioned into the East Lancashire Regiment as a second lieutenant in October 1915, with promotion to lieutenant following in July 1917. He was wounded in action on the Western Front in late 1917, when he fell victim to a German gas attack. He resigned his commission in December 1920, following the end of the war.

After the war, he resumed playing for East Lancashire Cricket Club in the Lancashire League. Following the resumption of first-class cricket, Norbury made his debut for Lancashire against Derbyshire at Old Trafford in the 1919 County Championship. Having passed a medical to play, he scored a half century and took five wickets across the match. Following his next match against Middlesex, Norbury found himself absent from the Lancashire side until late June following an attack of rheumatism. At the end of June, he made what would be his only first-class century, when he scored exactly 100 against Surrey. Having made eight County Championship appearances in 1919, Norbury would not play against for Lancashire until the 1922 County Championship, when he made a further six appearances. In total, he made fourteen first-class appearances for Lancashire, scoring 594 runs at an average of 25.82; with the ball, he took 23 wickets at a bowling average of 19.47, with best figures of 4 for 28.

He continued to play for East Lancashire until 1924, when he asked, to the surprise of many, for the East Lancashire committee to release him from his contract. He subsequently joined the Yorkshire-based Keighley Cricket Club for the 1925 season, though his engagement there lasted just one season, with Norbury signing for Church Cricket Club back in the Lancashire League for the 1926 season. He left Church at the end of the 1927 season, to play as an amateur for Blackpool Cricket Club for the 1928 season. Three years later, he signed as a professional in the Bolton League for Westhoughton, before rejoining East Lancashire halfway through 1932 as their professional for the season; whom he had previously scored over 7,000 runs and taken over 1,000 wickets. At the end of the 1932 season, he joined Lancashire League club Crompton, before being re-engaged by Blackpool midway through the 1934 season as their professional. The following year, he made a final appearance in first-class cricket, when he played for Sir Lindsay Parkinson XI's against Leicestershire at Blackpool in 1935.

Norbury later returned south, where he was employed by 1960 as the manager of a wallpaper company in South Norwood. He died at Sutton in October 1972. His brother-in-law, Henry Smoker, also played cricket for Hampshire and football for Southampton.
