= Arthur Dawson =

Arthur Dawson may refer to:

- Sir Arthur Trevor Dawson (1866–1931), English armaments manufacturer
- Arthur Dawson (footballer, born 1882) (1882–1951), English footballer for Blackburn Rovers and Burnley
- Arthur Dawson (trade unionist) (1890–c. 1966), British trade unionist and politician
- Arthur Dawson (footballer, born 1907) (1907–1985), English footballer for Nelson
- Arthur Potts Dawson (born 1971), English chef
