= Andre Seymore =

South African cricketer (born 1975)

Personal information
- Full name: Andre Johan Seymore
- Born: 16 February 1975 (age 51); Rustenburg, South Africa
- Batting: Right-handed
- Bowling: Leg break

Domestic team information
- Years: Team
- 1993/94–1996/97: Northern Transvaal
- 1997/98–2000/01: Gauteng
- 2000/01–2007/08: Easterns
- 2005/06: Titans
- 2008/09: Northerns
- First-class debut: 24 September 1993 Northern Transvaal v Barbados
- Last First-class: 19 February 2009 Northerns v KwaZulu-Natal Inland
- List A debut: 15 October 1993 Northern Transvaal v Eastern Province
- Last List A: 22 February 2009 Northerns v KwaZulu-Natal Inland

Career statistics
Competition	First-class	List A
Matches	107	81
Runs scored	6330	2251
Batting average	34.59	34.63
100s/50s	11/37	2/16
Top score	175	101
Balls bowled	46	6
Wickets	0	0
Bowling average	-	-
5 wickets in innings	0	0
10 wickets in match	0	0
Best bowling	0–4	0–7
Catches/stumpings	99/–	42/–
- Source: CricketArchive, 1 April 2012

Andre Johan Seymore (born 16 February 1975) is a retired South African cricketer. A right-handed upper-order batsman and occasional leg break bowler, he played first-class cricket for several provincial teams including Northern Transvaal, Gauteng, Easterns and Titans. In total, he was selected for almost 200 first-class and List A matches.

Seymore also played club cricket in England; he was the club professional for Frenchay Cricket Club in the West of England Premier League from 1999 until 2001, scoring 1685 runs across the three seasons, in addition Seymore played for Accrington in the Lancashire League during the 2002 and 2003 seasons. He played 59 matches for Accrington, scoring 2,529 runs at an average of 54.97.
