= Walsden Cricket Club =

Walsden Cricket Club (/ˈwɒlzdən/; WOLZ-dən) are an English cricket team currently playing in the Lancashire League; however, despite being in a Lancashire league, the village is actually situated in the county of West Yorkshire.

Walsden field 1XI 2XI and 3XI senior teams as well as U18, U15 and U13 junior teams.

The 2XI won their respective league beating Unsworth CC by 5 wickets on 28 August 2006 despite 3 matches to be played. In the same year Walsden won the aggregate trophy from the C.L.L. for the first time in the club's history.

Walsden's 2nd Xi once again skippered by Paul Marrow went on to win the respective league title again in 2007 also reaching the Burton Cup Final. The 2007 season saw a unique double for the club and the Marrow family as younger brother of Paul, Chris Marrow, skippered Walsden's 3rd Xi to their respective title as well. The first pair of brothers to lift league honours in the same season for the club.

Walsden is a small village north of Littleborough, in the Metropolitan Borough of Calderdale, making Walsden CC the most northerly club in the Central Lancashire League.

The ground is named the Ryan Carruthers Oval and has been since 2017, the ground is also reputable for having a gentle gradient toward the bowling greens on the south side and a short eastward boundary which is bordered by a stream and the main road through the town.

From the start of the 2018 season Walsden moved to the Lancashire League.

== Honours ==
Lancashire League

- 1st XI League Winners – 1 – 2018.
- Ron Singleton Colne Trophy Winners – 1 – 2019.
- 2nd XI League Winners – 1 – 2018.
- 2nd XI (Lancashire Telegraph) Cup Winners – 1 – 2018.
- 3rd XI League Winners – 1 – 2018.
