= Les Favell =

Australian cricketer

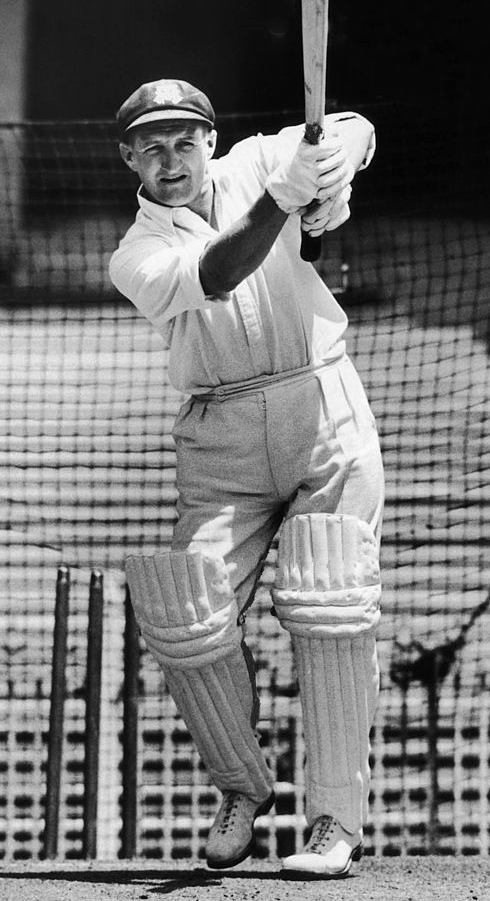
- Favell in 1954

Personal information
- Born: 6 October 1929; Arncliffe, New South Wales
- Died: 14 June 1987 (aged 57); Magill, South Australia
- Batting: Right-handed
- Bowling: Right-arm medium

International information
- National side: Australia
- Test debut (cap 198): 26 November 1954 v England
- Last Test: 27 January 1961 v West Indies

Career statistics
Competition	Tests	First-class
Matches	19	202
Runs scored	757	12,379
Batting average	27.03	36.62
100s/50s	1/5	27/67
Top score	101	190
Balls bowled	0	587
Wickets	–	5
Bowling average	–	69.00
5 wickets in innings	–	0
10 wickets in match	–	0
Best bowling	–	1/0
Catches/stumpings	9/0	110/0
- Source: CricInfo, 19 May 2019

== Cricket career ==
Leslie Ernest Favell MBE (6 October 1929 – 14 June 1987) was an Australian cricketer who played in 19 Test matches between 1954 and 1961. South Australia's fourth highest run scorer, Favell was a much loved character and a daring batsman who liked to hit the ball around the ground.

Favell moved to South Australia in 1951, joining the East Torrens Cricket Club. He debuted for South Australia the same year, playing 121 games (1951–1970) and captaining 95 games, including Sheffield Shield victories in 1963–64 and 1968–69. He made his Test debut against England in 1954–55 at Brisbane after making 84 and 47 against them for South Australia, but he failed in the series and was dropped. He is mentioned in Lord Kitchener's calypso single The Ashes (Australia vs MCC 1955): "Les Favell got going, his wicket went tumbling", referring to his 30, caught Cowdrey bowled Tyson, the first wicket of Tyson's seven in the 3rd Test at Melbourne.

He scored 12,379 runs in first-class cricket, the most by an Australian player who never toured England.

=== Captaincy ===
Favell was a positive captain, seeking scoring at a high rate for the time of 300 runs per day, regardless of wickets lost, to increase chances of successful run chases later in the game.

=== Recognition ===
Favell was appointed a Member of the Order of the British Empire (OBE) in the 1969 New Year Honours for service to cricket.

The Favell-Dansie Indoor Centre, Adelaide Oval's indoor cricket centre, is named after both Favell and his contemporary, Neil Dansie.

== Personal life ==
Favell and his wife Berry had a son. Favell died of kidney cancer.
