= Church and Oswaldtwistle Cricket Club =

Cricket club in England

Church & Oswaldtwistle Cricket Club
League	Lancashire League
Ground	West End Ground, Oswaldtwistle, Lancashire
Professional	Nimesha Gunasinghe (Sri Lanka)
2025 League Position	6th (Division 2)

Church and Oswaldtwistle Cricket Club, based at Oswaldtwistle, Accrington, is a cricket club in the Lancashire League. They play at the West End Ground on Blackburn Road in Oswaldtwistle. Their captain for the 2026 season is Raheem Kasser and their professional is Sri Lanka Nimesha Gunasinghe.

The club was founded in 1856. It moved to its present location in 1890 and joined the Lancashire League at its inception in 1892. The club has won the League on five occasions, most recently in 1963. During this period it has fielded notable cricketers such as Sydney Barnes, Cecil Parkin, and Chester Watson.

== Honours ==
- 1st XI League Winners - 5 - 1939, 1940, 1941, 1945, 1962
- Worsley Cup Winners - 1 - 1974
- 20/20 Cup Winners - 2 - 2014, 2016
- 2nd XI League Winners - 6 - 1898, 1926, 1930, 1938, 1991, 2010
- 2nd XI (Lancashire Telegraph) Cup Winners - 2 - 1999, 2010
- 3rd XI League Winners - 1 - 1984
- Highest 50 overs score - 400-4 v Rawtenstall, 19 June 2021
