= Bill Alley =

Australian and English cricketer

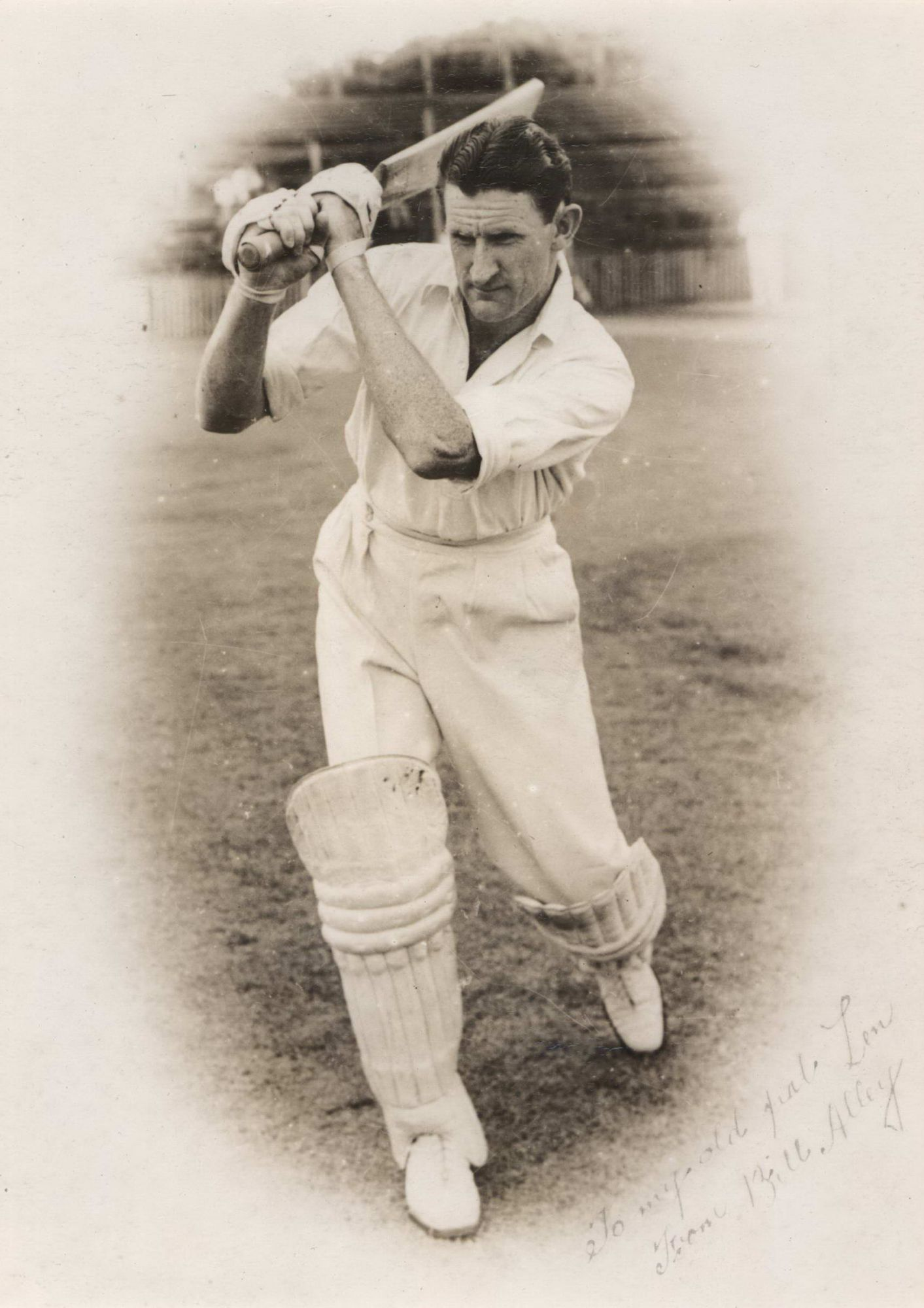

Personal information
- Full name: William Edward Alley
- Born: 3 February 1919; Hornsby, Sydney, Australia
- Died: 24 November 2004 (aged 85); Taunton, Somerset, England
- Batting: Left-handed
- Bowling: Right-arm medium-fast
- Role: All-rounder

Domestic team information
- Years: Team
- 1957–1968: Somerset
- 1945/46–1946/47: New South Wales
- FC debut: 23 November 1945 New South Wales v Queensland
- Last FC: 31 August 1968 Somerset v Gloucestershire
- LA debut: 22 May 1963 Somerset v Glamorgan
- Last LA: 14 September 1968 Somerset v Warwickshire

Umpiring information
- Tests umpired: 10 (1974–1981)
- ODIs umpired: 9 (1974–1981)

Career statistics
Competition	First-class	List A
Matches	400	17
Runs scored	19,612	288
Batting average	31.88	19.20
100s/50s	31/92	0/1
Top score	221*	58*
Balls bowled	46,034	1,105
Wickets	768	25
Bowling average	22.68	16.20
5 wickets in innings	30	0
10 wickets in match	1	0
Best bowling	8/65	4/14
Catches/stumpings	293/–	4/–
- Source: CricketArchive, 30 October 2007

William Edward Alley (3 February 1919 – 26 November 2004) was an Australian cricketer who played 400 first-class matches for New South Wales, Somerset and a Commonwealth XI. After retiring as a cricketer, Alley continued as a cricket umpire for many years.

Whilst in Australia, Alley was also a middleweight boxer, and was undefeated in 28 contests when he was forced to give it up after being hit on the head in the nets at cricket practice. His cricket career was interrupted and delayed both by his boxing career, and by World War Two, which saw first class cricket matches cancelled for 6 years.

He was tipped to play Tests by Don Bradman, the Australian cricket captain, but missed out after fracturing his jaw. This prompted him to leave New South Wales and come to Lancashire, England, playing league cricket there for Colne Cricket Club for five years from 1948, becoming the only player to score 1,000 runs in each of five consecutive seasons in the league's history.

This 5-year spell at Colne fulfilled the requirement at that time that any foreign player coming to England had to reside in England for 5 years before he could play first-class cricket in England. From Colne he moved to play for Blackpool CC in the newly established Northern League where he scored 19 centuries.

As the professional for Blackpool, he was able to earn more money than any first class cricketer anywhere in the world. Each League side in Lancashire was permitted to pay only one professional. During the 1950s and early 1960s, in the summer at any one time there were more than 150,000 holidaymakers in Blackpool, and there were very large crowds indeed paying at the turnstiles of Blackpool Cricket Club. Every season, moreover, the Blackpool pro was given a benefit match. Illustrating the value of the Blackpool job, Alley was succeeded as Blackpool's pro by many of the all-time greats of the game. These included Sir Conrad Hunte, Garfield Sobers, Pankaj Roy, Hanif Mohammad and Rohan Kanhai. Playing only 2 days a week would also have given the pro the opportunity to take a second job if he had so wanted, including playing for a Minor County or a first class County Second Eleven.

Alley was eventually tempted into joining Somerset CCC in 1957, when he was 38, since they offered a 3-year contract, while Blackpool could not commit to one of such length. Alley played 350 first-class games for Somerset, the last one being when he was 49.

After stopping playing, he umpired first-class games for 16 years and also stood in 10 Test matches and 9 One Day Internationals as umpire. He so loved the West Country area of England that he chose to remain there after retirement rather than move back to his native Australia.

Alley was married to Betty, whom he met when playing cricket in the north of England, and they had two sons. His first wife died in childbirth; they had a son, who died in an Army accident.

== Record in first-class cricket ==
Alley was an all-rounder. He scored 19,612 runs at an average of 31.88 batting left-handed. He took 768 wickets at 22.68 runs per wicket, with a best of 8 for 65, bowling right arm medium fast. He also took 267 catches in the field. His best season was his testimonial season in 1961 when, at the age of forty-two, he scored over 3,000 runs for Somerset and in one match achieved his highest score of 221 not out, out of Somerset's total of 311 all out. During the same season, he hit in excess of 300 runs in a match against the visiting Australians (184 not out in the first innings and 134 not out in the second).

His was the last instance of a batsman scoring 3,000 runs in an English season. Only eight batsmen in history have achieved the feat of 3,000 runs in an English season. At the end of that season, he topped the first-class averages, ahead of all the England and Australian Test cricketers, who in those days all played among the Counties six days a week throughout the season except when they were playing Test cricket.

Alley's 10 centuries for Somerset in 1961 remained a county record for thirty years. In 1962 he received the honour of being one of Wisden's five cricketers of the year, based on his performances in 1961 and during his career. In the 1962 season, he made over 1,900 runs and took 112 wickets. It was in 1962 that he got his best bowling return of 8 for 65 against a strong Surrey side, that included Ken Barrington, Peter May and Bernie Constable. Many people expressed doubts about his exact age, and on being presented by Denis Compton with the Cricketer of the Year Award for 1962, Compton said "it is stated that you are only 43 years old. Well if you are only 43, then I am still a baby in a nappy." Compton had retired 5 years earlier, in 1957, the same year Alley had started his English first-class career.
