= Ockert Erasmus =

South African cricketer (born 1988)

Personal information
- Full name: Ockert Johannes Erasmus
- Born: 20 January 1988 (age 38); Ladysmith, South Africa
- Batting: Right-handed
- Bowling: Off break

Domestic team information
- Years: Team
- 2008/09–: Boland
- First-class debut: 20 December 2009 Boland v Easterns
- List A debut: 1 February 2009 Boland v Gauteng

Career statistics
Competition	First-class	List A
Matches	10	32
Runs scored	265	132
Batting average	17.66	9.42
100s/50s	0/1	0/0
Top score	67	22*
Balls bowled	1349	1191
Wickets	27	39
Bowling average	25.55	24.23
5 wickets in innings	1	0
10 wickets in match	0	0
Best bowling	5–41	4–18
Catches/stumpings	1/–	9/–
- Source: CricketArchive, 31 March 2012

Ockert Johannes Erasmus (born 20 January 1988) is a South African professional cricketer who currently plays for Boland. He is a right-handed batsman and bowls right-arm off break.

Erasmus made his first-class debut for Boland in December 2009, having played his first List A match some ten months earlier. He has also played club cricket in England, for both Northern League side Netherfield and Lancashire League team East Lancashire, where he is currently the club professional.
