= Dewsbury and Savile Ground =

Cricket ground in Savile Town, Dewsbury, England

Coordinates: 53°41′01.86″N 1°38′01.94″W

The Dewsbury and Savile Ground was a cricket ground located in Savile Town, Dewsbury, England. It hosted 53 first class matches between 1867 and 1933. The first fixture saw Yorkshire play Cambridgeshire while Essex were the visitors in the final game held there. Yorkshire twice played the touring Australians at the ground and, in its earliest days, several first class 'All England' fixtures were held.

Yorkshire twice passed 500, scoring 562 against Leicestershire in 1903 and 507 for 8 declared against Warwickshire in 1925. Yorkshire bowled Somerset out for 48 at the ground in 1900 and dismissed Sussex for 51 in 1894. Three double centuries were recorded, two by Herbert Sutcliffe (213 v Somerset in 1924 and 206 v Warwickshire the following year) while Crowther Charlesworth scored 206 for Warwickshire in 1914. Billy Williams took 9 for 29 for Yorkshire against Hampshire in 1919 and Tom Emmett 9 for 34 against Nottinghamshire in 1868.

Bertram Harold Smithson, the father of Yorkshire and England cricketer Gerald Smithson, was cricket professional and head groundsman for Dewsbury & Savile CC in the early 1930s.

The ground was abandoned in the 1990s after the incumbent club, Dewsbury & Savile CC, could not afford to renovate the classic pre-war pavilion to modern standards. The local council refused financial aid without a guarantee that the club, ground and adjoining football field could be used for the wider community. As a private club, Dewsbury refused. The ground reverted to the council. Dewsbury merged with Whitley Lower CC to become Hopton Mills CC. The ground ceased to be a cricket ground and became a general recreation ground. The pavilion was demolished.
