= George Smoker =

English cricketer (1856–1925)

Personal information
- Full name: George Smoker
- Born: 30 December 1856; Ovington, Hampshire, England
- Died: 23 May 1925 (aged 68); Alresford, Hampshire, England
- Batting: Unknown
- Relatives: Henry Smoker (son)

Domestic team information
- Years: Team
- 1885: Hampshire

Career statistics
Competition	First-class
Matches	2
Runs scored	17
Batting average	5.66
100s/50s	–/–
Top score	13
Catches/stumpings	2/–
- Source: Cricinfo, 24 January 2010

George Smoker (30 December 1856 — 23 May 1925) was an English first-class cricketer.

Smoker was born in December 1856 at Ovington, Hampshire. He made two appearances in first-class cricket for Hampshire against the Marylebone Cricket Club and Derbyshire at Southampton in 1885, which was Hampshire's last season with first-class status until 1894. In these matches, he scored 17 runs. Smoker died at Alresford in May 1925. His son, Henry, was also a first-class cricketer.
