= Littleborough Cricket Club =

Littleborough Cricket Club, based in Littleborough, in the Metropolitan Borough of Rochdale, Greater Manchester, is an English cricket team currently playing in the Central Lancashire League.

The club was founded in 1839 and it played on the famous Hare Hill ground.

Littleborough was the founding member and inaugural champions of the Central Lancashire League, and have been league champions on twenty occasions, the last time being in 2005.

Littleborough holds Lancashire Cricket Board Focus Club status and is ECB Clubmark accredited. Two senior teams play in the CLL in addition to a 3rd XI who play in the North Manchester League.

The club's junior section fields teams in the CLL at U18, U15, U13, U11 and U9 age groups and the juniors receive expert coaching at the club during the summer on Monday evenings.

From start of the 2018 season Littleborough moved to the Lancashire League.

== Professional players ==
Many notable professionals have appeared in the Littleborough side over the years, including Sir Garfield Sobers, Joel Garner, Ezra Moseley, Franklyn Stephenson, Andy Roberts, Mike Whitney, and Stuart Law. The club's professional player engaged for 2012 is the Queensland batsman Clinton Perren. Littleborough is also the home club of the Surrey and England international Chris Schofield.

== Club honours ==
=== NMCL Division 2 Champions ===
2015

=== Hodson Cup Winners ===
2015

=== CLL champions ===
1892, 1911, 1912, 1917, 1919, 1921, 1932, 1934, 1935, 1936, 1977, 1978, 1983, 1985, 1986, 1992, 1996, 1998, 2002, 2005

=== Wood Cup ===
1935, 1941, 1942, 1973, 1974, 1976, 1982, 1986, 1992, 1994, 1997, 1998, 1999

=== JW Lees Lancashire Challenge Trophy ===
1997, 2005

=== 2nd XI champions ===
1910, 1920, 1928, 1936, 1973, 1988, 1989, 1991, 2005

=== Burton Cup ===
1985, 1990, 2002, 2003, 2004, 2005, 2006, 2007, 2011

=== Aggregate Cup ===
1932, 1935, 1936, 1977, 1985, 1988, 1989, 1990, 1992, 1996, 1998, 2002, 2004, 2005

=== Whittaker Cup ===
2006, 2007,

=== Taylor Cup ===
1996, 1997, 2006, 2007, 2016

=== Worsley Cup ===
2023
