= Crompton Cricket Club =

Crompton Cricket Club
League	Lancashire League
Ground	Glebe Street, Shaw and Crompton, Greater Manchester
CLL History	1896–2015
PL History	2016–2017
LL History	2018–present
Honours	First Division: 4 times (shared once); Wood Cup: 1 time Second Division: 3 times Burton Cup: Never

Crompton Cricket Club are an English cricket team, based in Shaw and Crompton, Greater Manchester, England. The club plays its home games at Glebe Street and competed in the Central Lancashire League until 2017.

From start of the 2018 season Crompton moved to the Lancashire League.

== Honours ==
First Division: 1902, 1918, 1954, 1965 (shared)
Wood Cup: 1980
Second Division: 1911, 1919, 1927
