= Accrington Cricket Club =

Cricket club

- League: Lancashire League; Senior Division 2

Personnel
- 1st XI captain: Graeme Sneddon
- 2nd XI captain: Rick Williams
- Chairman: Len Dewhurst
- Overseas player: Jurie Snyman (2024)

Team information
- City: Accrington
- Founded: 1846; 179 years ago
- Home ground: Thorneyholme Road

History
- Lancashire League wins: 8
- Worsley Cup wins: 4
- 3nd XI League wins: 1
- Official website: accringtoncricketclub.co.uk
- As of 9 February 2024

Accrington Cricket Club is a cricket club in the Lancashire League, which play their home games at Thorneyholme Road in Accrington.

The club was formed in 1846, going on to become a founding member of the Lancashire League in 1892. It has won the League Championship 8 times and the Worsley Cup 4 times.

For the 2024 season, Graeme Sneddon has been announced as captain, whilst 28-year-old South African Jurie Snyman has been announced as the club's professional for the season.

In its history, the club has fielded well known cricketers including David Lloyd, Graeme Fowler, Nathan Astle, Bobby Simpson, Eddie Barlow and Shane Warne.

== History ==
Formed in 1846, Accrington Cricket Club first played out of Tewitt Hall before relocating to Peel Park at the end of the 1859 season. It moved to its Thorneyholme Road home in 1877.

In 2007, it was revealed that the club had debts exceeding £10,000 and that its future was at risk. Despite the financial problems behind the scenes, the club went on to win the double in 2008, retaining the league title the following season in 2009.

Ahead of the 2019 season, the Lancashire League introduced a second division, Senior Division 2, of which Accrington would be relegated to at the end of the 2019 season having finished bottom of the first division.

In 2023, Accrington finished eleventh out of twelve teams in the Senior Division 2, the lowest league finish in the club's history.

== Professional players ==
It is a rule of the Lancashire League that each team must have a professional player in their squad. Should the professional be unavailable then a substitute must be found, with teams that fail to play a professional being fined.

2020–2029
Season	Nat.	Name
2024	(South Africa)	Jurie Snyman
2023	(England)	Jacob Clarke
2022	(England)	Jacob Clarke
2021	(Sri Lanka)	Lasith Lakshan
2020	COVID19	

2010–2019
Season	Nat.	Name
2019	(England)	Karl Brown
2018	(Sri Lanka)	Janith Liyanage
2017	(South Africa)	Michael Erlank
2016	(South Africa)	Ockert Erasmus
2015	(South Africa)	Ockert Erasmus
2014	(South Africa)	Ockert Erasmus
2013	(Pakistan)	Ashar Zaidi
2012	(Pakistan)	Ashar Zaidi
2011	(Pakistan)	Ashar Zaidi
2011	(Pakistan)	Will Driver
2011	(England)	Will Driver
2010	(England)	Will Driver

2000–2009
Season	Nat.	Name
2009	(Sri Lanka)	Roy Silva
2008	(Sri Lanka)	Roy Silva
2007	(India)	Nishit Shetty
2006	(India)	Nishit Shetty
2005	(Australia)	Tama Canning
2004	(Australia)	Tama Canning
2003	(South Africa)	Andre Seymore
2002	(South Africa)	Andre Seymore
2001	(Australia)	Tama Canning
2000	(Australia)	Tama Canning
2000	(New Zealand)	Nathan Astle

1990–1999
Season	Nat.	Name
1997	(New Zealand)	Nathan Astle
1991	(Australia)	Shane Warne

== Honours ==
- 1st XI League Winners - 8 - 1914, 1915, 1916, 1961, 1975, 2008, 2009, 2013
- Worsley Cup Winners - 4 - 1936, 1970, 1986, 2008
- Ron Singleton Colne Trophy Winners - 2 - 2013, 2014
- 2nd XI League Winners - 1 - 1912
- 2nd XI (Lancashire Telegraph) Cup Winners - 3 - 1978, 1979, 2000
- 3rd XI League Winners - 1 - 2001
- Highest 50 overs score - 341-5 v Rawtenstall, May 6, 2006
