= Charles Patrick =

Australian cricketer

Charles Wright Patrick
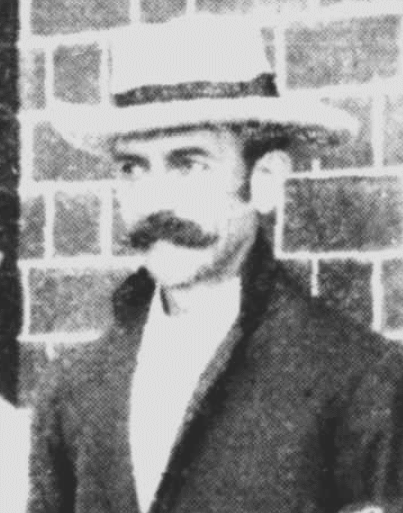

Personal information
- Born: 13 January 1866; Sydney, Australia
- Died: 29 November 1919 (aged 53); Coogee, New South Wales, Australia
- Source: ESPNcricinfo, 14 January 2017

Charles Patrick (13 January 1866 – 29 November 1919) was an Australian cricketer. He played six first-class matches for New South Wales and Queensland between 1893/94 and 1903/04.

== See also ==
- List of New South Wales representative cricketers
