= Rishton Cricket Club =

Club in Lancashire, England

- League: Lancashire League

Team information
- Home ground: Blackburn Road, Rishton, Lancashire, England

History
- Lancashire League wins: 8

Rishton Cricket Club is a cricket club in the Lancashire League, which plays its home games at Blackburn Road in Rishton, Lancashire, England. For the 2026 season their captain is Afaq Ali Sartaj.

The club was formed in 1865 and became a founder member of the Lancashire League in 1892. The club has won the League on eight occasions. The club has employed many well-known cricketers as professionals including Sydney Barnes, Allan Donald, Michael Holding and Viv Richards.

Former Accrington Stanley chairman and local businessman, Eric Whalley, was club captain of Rishton.

== Honours ==
- 1st XI League Winners - 8 - 1898, 1912, 1944, 1948, 1955, 1995, 1996, 2007
- Worsley Cup Winners - 6 - 1922, 1932, 1955, 1964, 1967, 1973
- Inter League Club Challenge Trophy Winners - 1 - 2001
- 20/20 Cup Winners - 1 - 2006
- 2nd XI League Winners - 4 - 1913, 1933, 1953, 1954
- 2nd XI (Lancashire Telegraph) Cup Winners - 2 - 2001, 2021
- 3rd XI League Winners - 2 - 1985, 1988
- Highest 50 overs score - 340-6 v Lowerhouse, 4 August 2001
