= Enfield Cricket Club =

- League: Lancashire League; ECB Premier League

Team information
- City: Accrington
- Founded: 1859; 167 years ago
- Home ground: Dill Hall Lane

History
- Lancashire League wins: 5
- Worsley Cup wins: 4
- As of 9 February 2024

Enfield Cricket Club is a cricket club in the Lancashire League (not to be confused with the club of the same name in Middlesex), which plays its home games at Dill Hall Lane in Accrington. The club has won the league on 5 occasions and the cup on 4. It has employed professionals including Clyde Walcott, Sylvester Clarke and Damien Fleming.

== Honours ==
- 1st League Winners - 5 - 1909, 1943, 1968, 1971, 1977
- Worsley Cup Winners - 4 - 1978, 1979, 1989, 1991
- 20/20 Cup - 1 - 2007
- Ron Singleton Colne Trophy - 1 - 2016
- 2nd XI League Winners - 6 - 1901, 1939, 1952, 1978, 1985, 1986
- 2nd XI (Lancashire Telegraph) Cup Winners - 1 - 1988
- 3rd XI League Winners - 5 - 1981, 1983, 1991, 2010, 2012

== See also ==
- Enfield F.C., an association football club formed by the cricket club, active in the 1880s
