= Ramsbottom Cricket Club =

Cricket club in the Lancashire League

Ramsbottom Cricket Club
League	Lancashire League
Ground	Acre Bottom, Ramsbottom, Greater Manchester
Professional	Daryn Smit (South Africa)
2013 League Position	4th

Ramsbottom Cricket Club is a cricket club in the Lancashire League, which plays its home games at Acre Bottom in Ramsbottom. The club has won the league on four occasions and won the cup 6 times, including two victories in consecutive years in 2001 and 2002. It has employed professionals including Wasim Raja, Keith Arthurton and Brad Hodge.

== Honours ==
- 1st XI League Winners - 6 - 1921, 1925, 1974, 1992, 2010, 2016
- Worsley Cup Winners - 8 - 1939, 1957, 1996, 2001, 2002, 2005, 2009, 2011
- 20/20 Cup - 3 - 2010, 2011, 2012
- Ron Singleton Colne Trophy Winners - 5 - 1997, 2006, 2010, 2011, 2012 (shared)
- 2nd XI League Winners - 11 - 1910, 1935, 1964, 1966, 1970, 1972, 1973, 2001, 2006, 2007, 2013
- 2nd XI (Lancashire Telegraph) Cup Winners - 12 - 1972, 1975, 1987, 1993, 1995, 2002, 2003, 2005, 2006, 2007, 2011, 2015
- 3rd XI League Winners - 4 - 1995, 1998, 1999, 2000
