= Colne Cricket Club =

English cricket club

Colne Cricket Club is a cricket club who play in the Lancashire League, which plays its home games at The Horsfield in Colne. For the 2022 season, their club captain is Tom Bradshaw. Their professional is Geeth Kumara of Sri Lanka. The club has won the league on five occasions and won the cup six times, achieving a league and cup double in 1959. It has employed professionals including Amar Singh, Bill Alley, Joe Scuderi and Collis King.

== History ==
The club was founded in 1830, making it the oldest club in the Lancashire League and among the oldest in the area. The club folded after around ten years but was reformed in 1848, soon employing its first professional and playing its first recorded matches against other clubs. The club folded again in 1854 before reforming once more in 1860, folding in 1871 and reforming again in 1874. In the years following the club attracted crowds in the thousands and began charging for admission, employing two full-time professionals.

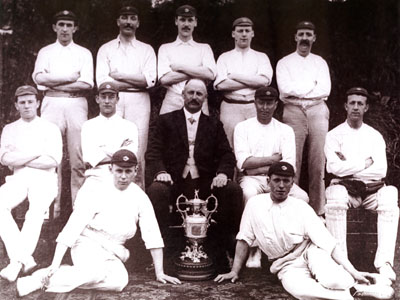
The players of Colne CC with the Lancashire League trophy won in 1910.

In 1891 Colne CC became founder members of the North East Lancashire Cricket League, which became the Lancashire League the following season. Colne finished as runners up in the first season but experienced no similar success in the 19th century. In 1898 the club president Richard Sager who had been intimately involved in every incarnation of the club died. The early 20th century saw success for Colne, winning the league in 1902, 1905 and 1910 and finishing second on three further occasions, losing a 1903 title play-off to local rivals Nelson. The 1904 match with Nelson drew a crowd of 10,000 to the Horsfield.

When the league resumed after the First World War Colne found little success, though the club did twice win the Worsley Cup in 1919 and 1924. In 1921 Colne played a match against probably the strongest side ever to play on the Horsfield - a Yorkshire team containing seven test players, losing by 22 runs. In 1935 Colne employed its first ever overseas professional, Amar Singh. He was seen as a rival to Nelson's Learie Constantine and his arrival caused the club's gate receipts and membership to double. Also that year Colne played against the largest crowd ever to watch the team. 14,000 people watched the fixture with Nelson at Seedhill which ended in a tie after Amar Singh took Nelson's last wicket with the scores level.

In 1948 Colne almost completed a league and cup double, winning the Worsley Cup and finishing second in the league by one point after falling just five runs short of victory in their final league match. Colne's professional in this period was Bill Alley who became the first player to score 1000 runs in a season for Colne, which he did in five successive seasons, the only player to achieve this feat in the Lancashire League's history. He went on to play for Blackpool and joined Somerset CCC at 38 Years of age setting records there and being the last player to score 3000 runs in a season, retiring at 49 to umpire at Test level. The club's fortunes declined after this point and in 1957 Colne finished bottom of the league for the first time.

International players could not join County teams and many came to play League cricket to gain experience of playing conditions for later tours and some gained residency to play for Counties. Learie Constantine, Everton Weekes, Clyde Walcott, Lance Gibbs, Charlie Griffiths, Wesley Hall and Ray Lindwall are just a few who would visit Horsfield. Colne could not afford these and depended on talent spotters suggesting younger players.

In 1959, an inexperienced Colne team completed the League and Cup double with a Celonese (Sri Lankan) professional Stanley Jayasinghe, who outscored Everton Weekes to 1000 runs. Colne were victorious over Bacup in the Worsley Cup final and won the final match of the season at Todmorden to take the title ahead of Todmorden and Nelson. Jayasinghe went on to play county cricket for several years with Leicester CCC

The club won the cup again in 1969 but achieved no further success for thirty years. The late eighties and early nineties were particularly difficult for Colne, with the club finishing bottom of the league in five out of six seasons and at one point winning just three matches over two seasons.

The club has moved forwards since the mid nineties. Financial stability enabled Colne to employ better professionals including Ben Johnson who scored a league record 1,716 runs in the 1996 season. In 1999 the club again won the Worsley Cup, beating East Lancs. in a match which went down to the last ball. By the end of the 20th century Colne were regularly finishing towards the top of the table, though this performance has declined in the 21st. However, a fantastic 2019 season saw Colne win the Division 2 Lancashire League table. This meaning Colne were the first ever team to win the second division title after the split at the end of the 2018 season. A fantastic season by professional James Price of South Africa followed by some dominant individual performances by the amateurs throughout the season meant Colne led the table from the first day to the end. Despite being favourites to finish bottom of the second division, Colne defied all odds to be crowned champions on the last day at Enfield.

Colne amateur players who have gone on to play County Cricket include Alan Wharton 1945 - 61 Lancashire and Leicester 1961 - 1963 ( 2 England caps in 1949) http://www.pcboard.com.pk/Archive/Players/0/857/857.html%5B%5D and Andrew Kennedy 1970 - 82 and the then Minor Counties side Durham. Andrew was 1975 Cricket writers young cricketer of the year.

== Ground ==
Colne play at the Horsfield in the east of Colne. This has been the club's home since its early years and has seen crowds of 10,000 people. A new pavilion was built in 1888 and this remained unaltered through much of twentieth century before being replaced in 1965 at the cost of £10,000. This structure was destroyed in a fire in 1974 and a new pavilion was built. This remains in use today, though it was extended in 2001.

== Honours ==
- 1st XI League Winners - 5 - 1902, 1905, 1910, 1959, 2019
- Worsley Cup Winners - 7 - 1919, 1924, 1948, 1959, 1969, 1999, 2010
- Ron Singleton Colne Trophy Winners - 1 - 2000 (shared)
- 2nd XI League Winners - 7 - 1904, 1905, 1914, 1934, 1936, 1937, 1965
- 2nd XI (Lancashire Telegraph) Cup Winners - 1 - 1996
