= Rawtenstall Cricket Club =

Cricket club in England

Rawtenstall Cricket Club
League	Lancashire League
Ground	Worswick Memorial Ground, Rawtenstall, Lancashire
Professional	Jovaun Van Wyngaardt (South Africa)
2018 League Position	20th

Rawtenstall Cricket Club is a cricket club in the Lancashire League, which plays its home games at the Worswick Memorial Ground in Rawtenstall. For the 2016 season its captain is Keith Roscoe the club was unable to get a professional as Brett Pelser, opted to leave to become professional at Horwich. The club recruited overseas amateur Nick Malio from Australia for the second half of the season. After a period of using substitute pro's including former pro Pelsner. The club has won the league on seven occasions and won the cup three times.

It has employed professionals including Colin Miller, Matthew Mott, Sydney Barnes, Michael Bevan and Andrew Hall. The chairman of Rawtenstall Cricket Club is Brian Payne.

In 2014 Rawtenstall Cricket Club have reached the final of the Worsley Cup. Their last appearance in the final was in 2003, overcoming East Lancashire Cricket Club in the process.

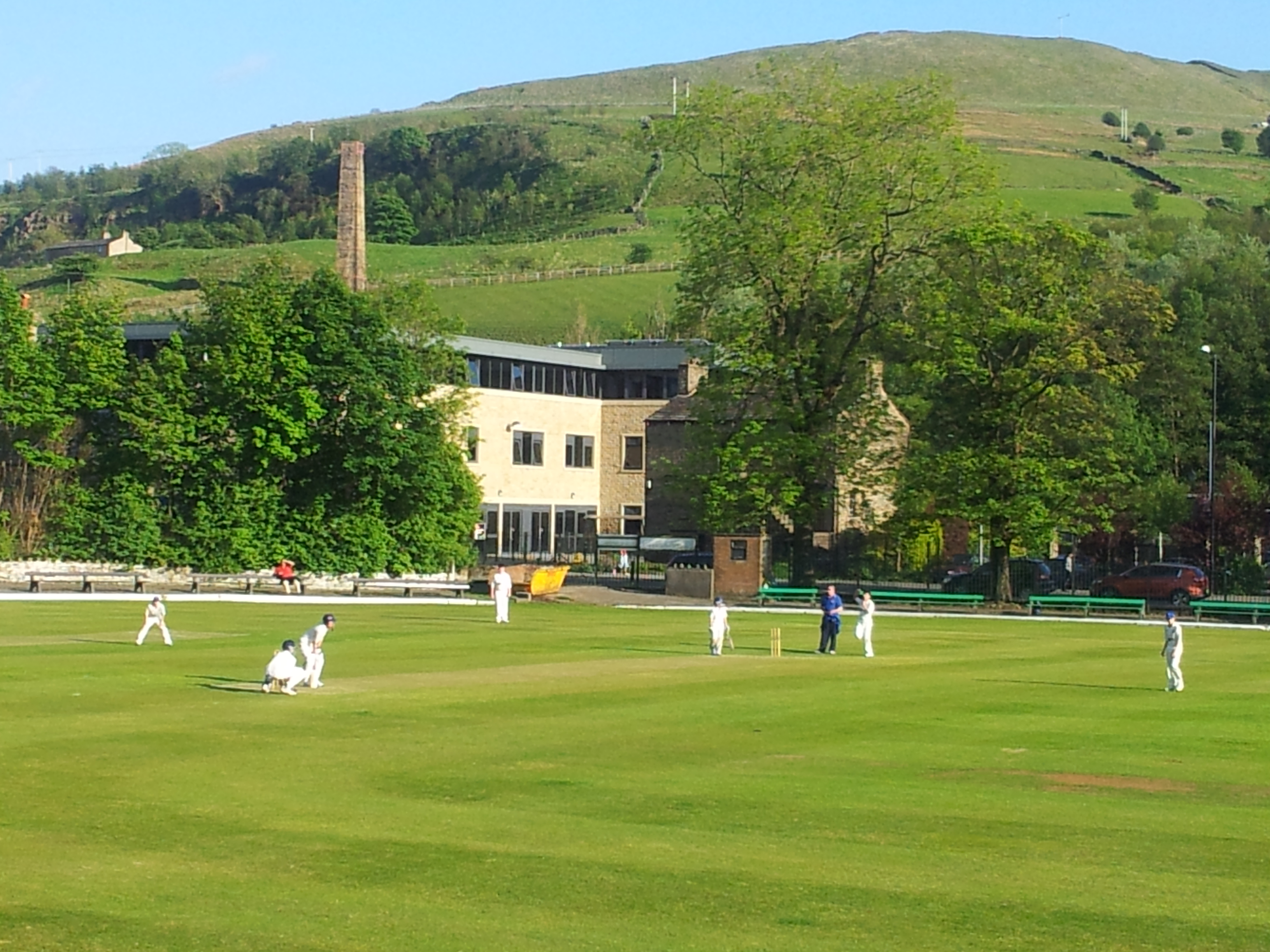
Cricket at Bacup Road in 2014

== Honours ==
- 1st XI League Winners – 7 – 1894, 1904, 1922, 1926, 1976, 1981, 1982
- Worsley Cup Winners – 4 – 1976, 1985, 1990, 2003
- Ron Singleton Colne Trophy Winners – 1 – 2004 (shared)
- 2nd XI League Winners – 11 – 1907, 1922, 1924, 1946, 1959, 1971, 1975, 1979, 1980, 1984, 1999
- 2nd XI (Lancashire Telegraph) Cup Winners – 1 – 1981
- 3rd XI League Winners – 1 – 2002
