= Todmorden Cricket Club =

Coordinates: 53°43′01.3″N 2°06′03.2″W

Todmorden
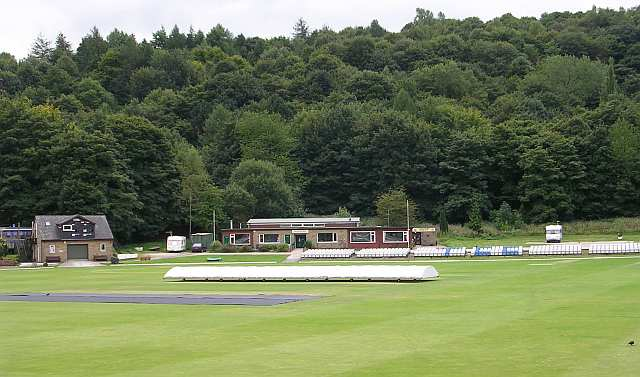
- Centre Vale
- League: Lancashire League

Personnel
- Captain: Andrew Sutcliffe

Team information
- Founded: 1837
- Home ground: Centre Vale

History
- Lancashire League wins: 5
- Worsley Cup wins: 8
- Ron Singleton Colne Trophy wins: 1
- 2nd XI League wins: 6
- Lancashire Telegraph Cup wins: 1
- Central Lancashire Cricket League wins: 1
- Notable players: Peter Lever

Todmorden Cricket Club is a cricket club in the Lancashire League, which plays its home games at Centre Vale in Todmorden, West Yorkshire. Until the administrative border was changed in 1888, the historic boundary between Lancashire and Yorkshire ran through the centre of the ground.

== History ==
In October 1890, Todmorden Cricket Club (Todmorden CC) were founder members of the Lancashire League (then called the North East Lancashire Cricket League), but resigned in February 1891 without playing a game.

In 1891, Todmorden CC was a founder member of the South East Lancashire Cricket League, which changed to the Central Lancashire Cricket League in 1893. The club won this league in 1896, before rejoining the Lancashire League for the 1897 season.

The club has won the Lancashire League on five occasions and won the Worsley Cup eight times.

== 2011 season ==
For the 2011 season, captain was Simon Newbitt, and its professional was Qaiser Abbas.

== Current players ==
For the 2026 season, the club professional is Glamorgan player Callum Taylor.

== Former players ==
=== Professionals ===
Todmorden has employed one or two professionals each season since at least 1897. England players who have played professionally for the club include Fred Root, Brian Close, Frank Tyson and Paul Allott.

A number of other international cricketers have been employed by Todmorden including Ashton Turner, Jim Burke, and Matt Nicholson (Australia); Mohsin Khan, Aftab Baloch, Qaiser Abbas and Bilawal Bhatti (Pakistan); Fanie de Villiers, Morné van Wyk, Francois du Plessis, Gulam Bodi, Kelly Smuts and David Wiese (South Africa); Ravi Ratnayeke and Chinthaka Jayasinghe (Sri Lanka); Brendan Nash and Vasbert Drakes (West Indies); and Gyanendra Pandey (India).

South Australian cricketer and long-time cricket administrator Neil Dansie played for Todmorden in the 1955 and 1956 season, scoring 1513 runs and taking 111 wickets over the two seasons.

=== Amateurs ===
Former Todmorden amateur players include Harold Dawson, Dick Horsfall and Derek Shackleton. Television weatherman John Kettley played for Todmorden Second and Third Eleven, he was once selected for the First Eleven.

== Honours ==
- 1st League Winners - 5 - 1927, 1933, 1938, 1954, 1957
- Worsley Cup Winners - 8 - 1935, 1937, 1938, 1954, 1962, 1963, 1982, 2000
- Ron Singleton Colne Trophy - 1 - 2009
- 2nd XI League Winners - 6 - 1897, 1899, 1902, 1908, 1920, 2016
- 2nd XI (Lancashire Telegraph) Cup Winners - 1 - 1980

== Records ==
In April 2017, South African professional Kelly Smuts made the highest total in the history of the Lancashire League for Todmorden, scoring 211; a record previously held by future Australia Captain Michael Clarke with 200 for Ramsbottom in 2002.
