= Haslingden Cricket Club =

- Sport: cricket
- League: Lancashire League
- Home ground: Bentgate, Haslingden, Lancashire
- Professional: to be confirmed for 2021
- 2019 League Position: 4th

Haslingden Cricket Club is a cricket club in the Lancashire League, which plays its home games at Bentgate in Haslingden. For the 2020 and 2021 seasons its captain is Jordan Shannon. For the first time post war, the club did not employ a professional for the shortened 2020 season owing to the Coronavirus pandemic. The club has won the league on 12 occasions and the cup on 5. It has employed professionals including George Headley, Vinoo Mankad, Clive Lloyd and Dennis Lillee. Another notable professional was West Indian opening batsman Phil Simmons. Ian Austin went on to have a successful career with Lancashire and England. Played for Haslingden as both an amateur and professional having started his career at Haslingden as a junior.

== Honours ==
- 1st XI League Winners - 12 - 1900, 1920, 1953, 1983, 1985, 1987, 1988, 1989, 1991, 1993, 1997, 2004
- Worsley Cup Winners - 5 - 1921, 1977, 1992, 1994, 1997
- Inter League Club Challenge Trophy Winners - 2 - 1998, 2003
- 20/20 Cup - 1 - 2005
- 2nd XI League Winners - 17 - 1895, 1921, 1948, 1950, 1963 (shared), 1977, 1981, 1982, 1992, 1993, 1995, 1997, 1998, 2000, 2003, 2005, 2012
- 2nd XI (Lancashire Telegraph) Cup Winners - 7 - 1976, 1989, 1991, 1992, 1998, 2012, 2016
- 3rd XI League Winners - 4 - 2005, 2008, 2011, 2015
