= Bacup Cricket Club =

Bacup Cricket Club
League	Lancashire League
Ground	Lanehead, Bacup, Lancashire
Professional	Serasinghe Pathiranage Sachithra Chaturanga(Sri Lanka)
2018 League Position	21st

Bacup Cricket Club, based at Lanehead in Bacup, Lancashire, are a cricket club in the Lancashire League.

The club was formed in 1860, and still uses its original ground in Lanehead Lane. The club received a grant from Valencia Waste Management through the Landfill Communities Fund, for refurbishment of its facilities and function rooms.

Their professional for the 2008 season was Chris Harris.

== Honours ==
- 1st XI League Winners - 10 - 1899, 1921, 1923, 1924, 1930, 1958, 1960, 2000, 2001, 2002
- Worsley Cup Winners - 6 - 1923, 1927, 1930, 1956, 1972, 1993
- Ron Singleton Colne Trophy Winners - 3 - 2001, 2002, 2003
- 2nd XI League Winners - 6 - 1951, 1955, 1960, 1962, 1988, 1989
- 2nd XI (Lancashire Telegraph) Cup Winners - 2 - 1977, 1990
- 3rd XI League Winners - 1 - 1996
