= Lowerhouse Cricket Club =

- League: Lancashire League

Personnel
- Captain: Benjamin Heap
- 2nd XI captain: Declan Stansfield

Team information
- Colours: Royal blue and yellow
- Founded: 1862
- Home ground: Brooks Foundation Ground, Liverpool Road, Burnley

History
- Lancashire League wins: 5
- Worsley Cup wins: 5
- 20/20 Cup wins: 1
- Ron Singleton Colne Trophy wins: 3
- 2nd XI League wins: 3
- Lancashire Telegraph Cup wins: 2
- 3nd XI League wins: 2
- Official website: lowerhousecc.com

Lowerhouse Cricket Club is a cricket club in the Lancashire League, which plays its home games at The Brooks Foundation Ground on Liverpool Road in Burnley.

In recent years the club has been very successful, winning the Lancashire League in 2005, 2011, 2012, 2014 and 2025, the Worsley Cup in 2004, 2012, 2018, 2021 and 2024, and the 20/20 Cup in 2013. The club won the Lancashire League for the first time in 2005, captained by Joe Beneduce, having won the Worsley Cup for the first time the year before, captained by Matt Hope. It has employed professionals, including Matthew Mott, Ryan Harris, Martin van Jaarsveld, Jacques Rudolph and Peter Fulton.

== History ==
A team called Lowerhouse played on a field near the former Griffin Hotel on Rossendale Road between 1855 and 1861. When it was dissolved, three new teams were founded. However, in 1863, the three teams merged again to re-form Lowerhouse Cricket Club. For many years they were still known as the Garibaldians, after one of the teams started in 1862. When in 1874, the club employed Gibson Price as the professional, he also worked as the groundsman. By 1890, the club's finances had improved to a point that two professionals were employed. The membership rose from 93 in 1882, to 570 in 1915.

== Honours ==
The club has won the following honours:

- 1st XI League - 5 - 2005, 2011, 2012, 2014, 2025
- Worsley Cup - 5 - 2004, 2012, 2018, 2021, 2024
- 20/20 Cup - 1 - 2013
- Ron Singleton Colne Trophy - 3 - 2012 (shared), 2022, 2025
- 2nd XI League - 3 - 1900, 1923, 1927
- 2nd XI (Lancashire Telegraph) Cup - 2 - 1973, 1982
- 3rd XI League - 2 - 2004, 2014

== See also ==
- Burnley Cricket Club - another Lancashire League team from Burnley
