= Lancashire League (cricket) =

English cricket league

- Countries: England
- Format: Limited Overs
- First edition: 1892
- Tournament format: League
- Number of teams: 12 (ECB Premier Division)
- Current champion: Burnley CC
- Most successful: Nelson CC (21)
- Website: https://lancashireleague.play-cricket.com/

The Lancashire League is a competitive league of local cricket clubs drawn from the small to middle-sized mill towns, mainly but not exclusively, of East Lancashire. Its real importance is probably due to its history of employing professional players of international standing to play in the League. After declining earlier opportunities to have this status, the league became an ECB Premier League from the 2023 season.

== History ==
The Lancashire Cricket League was formed on 16 March 1892, growing from the North East Cricket League which had been formed 17 months earlier. Currently in membership are Accrington CC, Bacup CC, Burnley CC, Church CC, Clitheroe CC, Colne CC, Crompton CC, Darwen Cricket Club, East Lancashire CC, Enfield CC, Great Harwood CC, Greenmount CC, Haslingden CC, Littleborough CC, Lowerhouse CC, Middleton CC, Nelson CC, Norden CC, Ramsbottom CC, Rawtenstall CC, Rishton CC, Rochdale CC, Todmorden CC (actually in Yorkshire) and Walsden CC (in West Yorkshire). In the early years, Bury CC were also members, but they withdrew after participating for two seasons.

The early 1890s saw the sudden emergence of cricket leagues all over Lancashire, with the first in 1888 – the Bolton Association. The North Lancashire League and the Central Lancashire League each started the same year as the Lancashire League in 1892. The Football League had set a trend in season 1888–89 and also had its heart in Lancashire, and with professionals and regular friendlies and local derbies, the leagues quickly became very popular institutions, with games played at weekends when working people had rare leisure time.

In the early years, until 1899, it was possible for each team to field two professionals, but this was restricted for the 1900 season to one. The League Centenary was celebrated in 1992, and in 1998 a major exhibition about the League was mounted by Horse and Bamboo Theatre at their centre with the involvement of the author Ron Freethy.

In 1981, the League's name was amended to include the name of a sponsor, initially Blackburn brewer Matthew Brown, later E. W. Cartons and Sponsorbank, among others, and currently J. W. Lees.

The Lancashire League, in its first season of 1892, consisted of only thirteen clubs (the fourteen current members, minus Todmorden) before Bury played in 1893 and 1894 to give the league fourteen clubs. Bury left for the 1895 season, before Todmorden joined in 1897. The membership of the League did not then change for another 120 years, until three new clubs—Clitheroe, Darwen and Great Harwood—joined in 2017. In 2018, the number of member clubs was increased to 24 with the admission of Crompton, Norden, Littleborough, Middleton, Milnrow, Rochdale and Walsden; however, in 2019 Milnrow resigned from the League after two seasons, to be replaced in 2020 by Bury's Greenmount CC. In addition, Edenfield entered the 20/20 Cup between 2007 and 2014, but did not enter any other Lancashire League competition.

== Senior competitions ==
=== 1st XI League ===
The league's 22 current member clubs are divided into two divisions. Games start out as 50 over matches but if rain affects play they can be reduced to a minimum of 20 overs. The method for working out reduced targets is to take 3/4 of the first innings run rate off the first innings score for every over that is lost in the second innings. One over is lost for every 7 minutes in the first innings and every 3½ minutes in the second innings. The second innings can be less than 20 overs as long as there were more than 20 overs bowled in the first innings and the team batting second believe they can chase the full total posted in the first innings or the team bowling second believe they can bowl their opponents out in the allocated overs. If the team batting second get the full total then they win. If the team bowling second bowl out the team batting second then they win. If neither team does this then it is a No Result. For example, Lowerhouse scored 124-7 off their allocated 31 overs. Nelson opted to chase 125 for victory off 12 overs. They ended up on 82-7 so neither team won and it was a no result. 10 points are awarded for a win, 7 points for a tie, 3 points for a no result and 2 points for bowling the opposition out. Up to 5 bonus points are then awarded to the team who lost. If the team that lost bowled second they get 1-point for 5 wickets, 2 for 6 wickets, 3 for 7 wickets, 4 for 8 wickets and 5 for 9 wickets. If they batted second they get 1-point for being within 50 runs, 2 points for being within 40 runs, 3 points for being within 30 runs, 4 points for being within 20 runs and 5 points for being within 10 runs. 1 point is deducted for slow over rate in an innings of more than 40 overs. One over is expected to be bowled in 3¾ minutes. One bowler may bowl up to 17 overs while no other bowlers may bowl more than 14 overs.

=== Worsley Cup ===
Every club in the league competes in this knockout tournament with two teams being given a random bye to the second round (there are four rounds in all). All games have to be 50 overs and if not completed on the given date have to be continued on weeknights or, if still in the first innings, the following Saturday. The first game is generally played on a Sunday and the reserve date is always a Saturday. Bowlers can bowl no more than ten overs each.

=== Ron Singleton Colne Trophy ===
The League winner plays the Worsley Cup winner in this competition. If a team wins both competitions then the Double winners play the team that finished second the previous year. It is played on the Saturday before the League starts. It is played to the same match rules as the Worsley Cup except that overs are deducted for bad weather. The Colne Trophy has to be a minimum of 20 overs. If the game cannot be completed then the trophy is shared.

=== 20/20 Cup ===
There are three groups: two consisting of six teams and one group consisting of five. The top three clubs from each group (top two from the group of five) go through to the quarter-final. In the group stage, each team plays each other team once. Two points are awarded for a win and one point for a draw. Each team must face a minimum of five overs for a game to be valid. The method for working out reduced targets is to subtract the full run rate for every over lost in the second innings. Games are played mainly on a Friday night, but are occasionally played on a Thursday night. Teams can play in colours if they wish. Bowlers can bowl no more than four overs.

== The professionals ==
A number of notable cricketers from all over the world have come to live in Lancashire and play in the League, including Dik Abed, Bill Alley, Nyron Asgarali, Nathan Astle, Sydney Barnes, Allan Border, Chris Cairns, Michael Clarke, Sir Learie Constantine, Kapil Dev, Allan Donald, Bruce Dooland, Roy Gilchrist, Dennis Lillee, Trevor Chappell, Jason Gillespie, Kerry O'Keeffe, Charlie Griffith, Andrew Hall, Wes Hall, Roger Harper, Chris Harris, George Headley, Michael Holding, Murali Kartik, Charlie Llewellyn, Clive Lloyd, Manny Martindale, Mark Orchard, Cec Pepper, Viv Richards, Andy Roberts, Fred Root, Jacques Rudolph, Peter Sleep, 'Big' Jim Smith, Hugh Tayfield, George Tribe, Lou Vincent, Shane Warne, Chester Watson, Steve Waugh, Bilawal Bhatti, Alviro Petersen, Robin Peterson, Vijay Hazare , and Everton Weekes. It is a rule of the competition that each team must have a professional player in their squad. Should the professional be unavailable, then a substitute must be found. Teams not playing a pro can be fined.

== Documentaries ==
=== Beyond a Boundary ===
In C.L.R. James' autobiographical Beyond a Boundary, the Trinidadian writer writes about his visits as a young man to his friend Learie Constantine, at that time living in Nelson while playing as a professional for the town Lancashire League team. He gives a vivid sense of what it must have been like for a young West Indian to arrive in the wet and strange East Lancashire. He also describes how his subsequent education at university in Paris is helped by a local baker, and how his gradual politicisation is given a boost by meetings with local socialists, concerned with the harsh treatment and conditions suffered by the local working class millworkers. Although an extreme example, the meetings between other professional cricketers from the British Empire, and the mainly working-class amateurs of the Lancashire League, must have resulted in many other instances of mutual support and understanding.

=== Race and Pace: West Indians in the East Lancashire League ===
The league and its relationship with West Indies professional cricketers is the subject of a 2017 BBC television documentary: Race and Pace: West Indians in the East Lancashire League. The film features original footage of the players, shots of the ground and interviews with Wes Hall, Viv Richards, David Lloyd, and Learie Constantine's daughter.

== Champions ==
- League Champions 1891-1910
  Year	Club
  1891	East Lancashire
  1892	Nelson
  1893	Burnley
  1894	Rawtenstall
  1895	Nelson
  1896	Nelson
  1897	Burnley
  1898	Rishton
  1899	Bacup
  1900	Haslingden
  1901	Burnley
  1902	Colne
  1903	Nelson
  1904	Rawtenstall
  1905	Colne
  1906	Burnley
  1907	Burnley
  1908	Burnley
  1909	Enfield
  1910	Colne
- League Champions 1911-1930
  Year	Club
  1911	Nelson
  1912	Rishton
  1913	Burnley
  1914	Accrington
  1915	Accrington
  1916	Accrington
  1917	no competition
  1918	no competition
  1919	East Lancashire
  1920	Haslingden
  1921	Ramsbottom
  1922	Bacup and Rawtenstall
  1923	Bacup
  1924	Bacup
  1925	Ramsbottom
  1926	Rawtenstall
  1927	Todmorden
  1928	Nelson
  1929	Nelson
  1930	Bacup
- League Champions 1931-1950
  Year	Club
  1931	Nelson
  1932	Nelson
  1933	Todmorden
  1934	Nelson
  1935	Nelson
  1936	Nelson
  1937	Nelson
  1938	Todmorden
  1939	Church and Oswaldtwistle
  1940	Church and Oswaldtwistle
  1941	Church and Oswaldtwistle
  1942	East Lancashire
  1943	Enfield
  1944	Rishton
  1945	Church and Oswaldtwistle
  1946	Nelson
  1947	East Lancashire
  1948	Rishton
  1949	East Lancashire
  1950	Burnley
- League Champions 1951-1970
  Year	Club
  1951	East Lancashire
  1952	East Lancashire
  1953	Haslingden
  1954	Todmorden
  1955	Rishton
  1956	Burnley
  1957	Todmorden
  1958	Bacup
  1959	Colne
  1960	Bacup
  1961	Accrington
  1962	Church and Oswaldtwistle
  1963	East Lancashire
  1964	Burnley
  1965	Nelson
  1966	East Lancashire
  1967	Nelson
  1968	Enfield
  1969	Nelson
  1970	Burnley
- League Champions 1971-1990
  Year	Club
  1971	Enfield
  1972	East Lancashire
  1973	East Lancashire
  1974	Ramsbottom
  1975	Accrington
  1976	Rawtenstall
  1977	Enfield
  1978	Burnley
  1979	Burnley
  1980	East Lancashire
  1981	Rawtenstall
  1982	Rawtenstall
  1983	Haslingden
  1984	East Lancashire
  1985	Haslingden
  1986	Nelson
  1987	Haslingden
  1988	Haslingden
  1989	Haslingden
  1990	East Lancashire
- League Champions 1991-2010
  Year	Club
  1991	Haslingden
  1992	Ramsbottom
  1993	Haslingden
  1994	Nelson
  1995	Rishton
  1996	Rishton
  1997	Haslingden
  1998	Nelson
  1999	Nelson
  2000	Bacup
  2001	Bacup
  2002	Bacup
  2003	East Lancashire
  2004	Haslingden
  2005	Lowerhouse
  2006	Burnley
  2007	Rishton
  2008	Accrington
  2009	Accrington
  2010	Ramsbottom
- League Champions 2011-2026
  Year	Club
  2011	Lowerhouse
  2012	Lowerhouse
  2013	Accrington
  2014	Lowerhouse
  2015	Burnley
  2016	Ramsbottom
  2017	Clitheroe
  2018	Walsden
  2019	Burnley
  2020	no competition
  2021	Burnley
  2022	Darwen
  2023	Burnley
  2024	Burnley
  2025	Lowerhouse
  2026	Burnley

=== Championships won ===
1891 - 2026
Wins	Club
21	Nelson
20	Burnley
15	East Lancashire
12	Haslingden
10	Bacup (Note: Including 1 shared title (1922).)
8	Accrington
8	Rishton
7	Rawtenstall
6	Ramsbottom
5	Church and Oswaldtwistle
5	Enfield
5	Lowerhouse
4	Colne
4	Todmorden
1	Clitheroe
1	Darwen
1	Walsden

== Premier performance by season from 2023 ==
Key
Gold	Champions
Blue	Left League
Red	Relegated

Performance by season, from 2023
Club	2023	2024	2025	2026
Burnley	1	1	9	1
Church and Oswaldtwistle		11		
Clitheroe	4	4	4	10
Darwen	3	2	6	8
Enfield	9	12		9
Greenmount				5
Haslingden	10	10	10	11
Littleborough	2	9	5	12
Lowerhouse	6	3	1	4
Middleton		8	12	
Norden	5	5	8	6
Ramsbottom	12		7	3
Rochdale	8	7	11	
Todmorden	7	6	2	7
Walsden	11		3	2
References				
