= Australian cricket team in England in 1956 =

International cricket tour

- Date: 7 June 1956 – 28 August 1956
- Location: England
- Result: England won the 5-Test series 2–1
Teams
- England: Australia
Captains
- PBH May: IWG Johnson
Most runs
- PBH May (453) PE Richardson (364): JW Burke (271); CC McDonald (243)
Most wickets
- JC Laker (46) GAR Lock (15): KR Miller (21); RG Archer (18)

The Australian cricket team toured England in the 1956 season to play a five-match Test series against England for The Ashes.

England won the series 2–1 with 2 matches drawn and therefore retained The Ashes.

The series is most notable for off-spinner Jim Laker's 46 wickets (a record for a 5-Test series) at an average of 9.60, including all ten wickets in the second innings of the fourth Test at Old Trafford, the first time this had been achieved in Test cricket. In that Test, known as Laker's Match, Laker took 19 wickets for 90 runs, still the best match bowling analysis achieved in both Test and all first-class cricket. Earlier in the summer, Laker had also taken ten wickets in an innings against the Australians in a tour match, playing for Surrey.

== Test series ==
=== 1st Test ===
7–12 June 1956
scorecard

England	v	Australia
217/8 (dec) (103.4 overs); PE Richardson 81; PBH May 73; KR Miller 4/69		148 (83.1 overs); RN Harvey 64; JC Laker 4/58
188/3 (dec) (61 overs); MC Cowdrey 81; PE Richardson 73; KR Miller 2/58		120/3 (86 overs); JW Burke 58; JC Laker 2/29

Match drawn
Trent Bridge
Umpires: TS Bartley (ENG) and JS Buller (ENG)

- Peter Richardson (Eng) made his Test debut.

=== 2nd Test ===
21–26 June 1956
scorecard

Australia	v	England
285 (146.1 overs); CC McDonald 78; JW Burke 65; JC Laker 3/47		171 (82 overs); PBH May 63; KR Miller 5/72
257 (92.5 overs); R Benaud 97; FS Trueman 5/90		186 (99.2 overs); PBH May 53; KR Miller 5/80; RG Archer 4/71

Australia won by 185 runs
Lord's Cricket Ground
Umpires: DE Davies (ENG) and FS Lee (ENG)

- Pat Crawford and Ken Mackay (Aus) made their Test debuts.

=== 3rd Test ===
12–17 July 1956
scorecard

England	v	Australia
325 (167.4 overs); PBH May 101; C Washbrook 98; RR Lindwall 3/67; RG Archer 3/68; R Benaud 3/89		143 (71.1 overs); JW Burke 41; KR Miller 41; JC Laker 5/58; GAR Lock 4/41
		140 (follow-on) (99.3 overs); RN Harvey 69; JC Laker 6/55; GAR Lock 3/40

England won by an innings and 42 runs
Headingley
Umpires: JS Buller (ENG) and DE Davies (ENG)

- Alan Oakman (Eng) made his Test debut.

=== 4th Test ===
26–31 July 1956
scorecard

England	v	Australia
459 (158.3 overs); DS Sheppard 113; PE Richardson 104; MC Cowdrey 80; IW Johnson 4/151		84 (40.4 overs); CC McDonald 32; JC Laker 9/37
		205 (follow-on) (150.2 overs); CC McDonald 89; JC Laker 10/53

England won by an innings and 170 runs
Old Trafford
Umpires: DE Davies (ENG) and FS Lee (ENG)

=== 5th Test ===
23–28 August 1956
scorecard

England	v	Australia
247 (109.2 overs); DCS Compton 94; PBH May 83; RG Archer 5/53; KR Miller 4/91		202 (92 overs); KR Miller 61; JC Laker 4/80
182/3 (dec) (61 overs); DS Sheppard 62; RR Lindwall 1/29		27/5 (38.1 overs); IWG Johnson 10; JC Laker 3/8

Match drawn
The Oval
Umpires: TJ Bartley (ENG) and DE Davies (ENG)

== Annual reviews ==
- Playfair Cricket Annual 1957
- Wisden Cricketers' Almanack 1957
