= Thoms =

Thoms is a surname. Notable people with the surname include:

- Adah Belle Thoms (1870–1943), African-American nurse
- Albie Thoms (1941–2012), Australian film director
- Alexander Thoms (1837–1925), Scottish mineralogist
- Arne Thoms (born 1971), German tennis player
- Art Thoms (born 1947), American football player
- Bill Thoms (1910–1964), Canadian ice hockey player
- Bob Thoms (1826–1903), English cricket umpire
- Bobby Thoms (1909–2003), Australian rules footballer
- Daniela Anschütz-Thoms (born 1974), German speed skater
- Frederic Count de Thoms (1669–1746), German art collector
- George Thoms (1927–2003), Australian cricket player
- Harry Thoms (1896–1970), English footballer
- Jerome Thoms (1907–1977), American film editor
- Jim Thoms (1918–2005), Australian rules footballer
- Kevin Thoms (born 1979), American actor
- Laurence Thoms (born 1980), Fijian alpine skier
- Lothar Thoms (1956–2017), German cyclist
- Paul Thoms (1932–2012), Canadian surveyor and politician
- Peter Thoms, English musician
- Peter Perring Thoms (1791–1855), English printer and translator
- Shirley Thoms (1925–1999), Australian country music player
- Sven Thoms (born 1970), German biochemist
- Tracie Thoms (born 1975), American actress
- Trev Thoms (1950–2010), British guitarist
- William Thoms (1803–1885), British writer
