= 1945 SANFL Grand Final =

South Australian National Football League

West Torrens	Port Adelaide
15.25 (115)	15.12 (102)
	1	2	3	4
WT	2.7 (19)	9.11 (65)	13.17 (83)	15.25 (115)
PTA	8.3 (51)	9.7 (61)	13.11 (89)	15.12 (102)
- Date: Saturday, 29 September (2:10 pm)
- Stadium: Adelaide Oval
- Attendance: 47,500

Accolades
- Best on Ground: Jim Thoms
- Australian Football Hall of Fame: Haydn Bunton Sr. (1996; Legend); Bob Quinn (1996); Bob Hank (1999); Bob McLean (2007)
- Commentators: Steve McKee (5AD)

The 1945 SANFL Grand Final was an Australian rules football game contested between the Port Adelaide Football Club and the West Torrens Football Club, held at Adelaide Oval in Adelaide on 29 September 1945. It was the 47th Grand Final of the South Australian National Football League, staged to determine the premiers for the 1945 SANFL season. The match, attended by 47,500 spectators, was won by West Torrens by a margin of 13 points, marking that club's third premiership victory. The game is also remembered for being the final game of Haydn Bunton Sr's career.

== Background ==
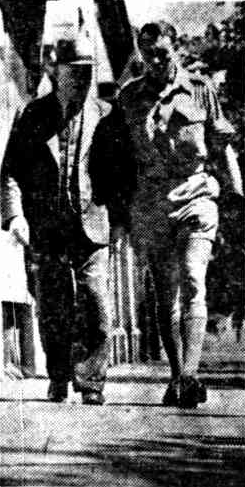
Haydn Bunton Sr. was recruited by Port Adelaide secretary Charles Hayter for the 1945 season. The 1945 SANFL Grand Final was his final game.

This was the first SANFL Grand Final held after World War Two, with Japan surrendering 27 days prior to the game.

== Match summary ==
=== First quarter ===
Port Adelaide's first quarter score of 8.3 (51) remains the largest opening term to any SANFL grand final.

== Teams ==
Port Adelaide
B:	Victor Serotzki	Donald Fletcher	William McFarlane
HB:	Colin Herbert	Leslie McLean	Lindsay Darling
C:	Lyall Kretschmer	Lew Roberts	Louis Mangan
HF:	Ronald Hall	John Faulkhead	Clarence Dayman
F:	Ronald Hoffman	Colin Grimm	Ken Jolly
Foll:	Bob McLean	Haydn Bunton Sr	Bob Quinn
Int:	Kevin Growden		
Coach:	Bob Quinn		

West Torrens
B:	Sully	A Roberts	John Hammerstein
HB:	Stanley Cox	Jack Thiele	R Roberts
C:	Edwards	Bob Hank	Barnes
HF:	Wood	McInnes	Phillips
F:	Nicholls	Hodgins	Turner
Foll:	Prior	Bill Tonkin	Jim Thoms
Int:	Coverlid		
Coach:	Mal Drury		

== Scorecard ==
Grand Final
{{{date}}}	Port Adelaide	def. by	West Torrens	Adelaide Oval (crowd: 47,500)
8.3 (51); 9.7 (61); 13.11 (81); 15.12 (102)	Q1; Q2; Q3; Final	2.7 (19); 9.11 (65); 13.17 (83); 15.25 (115)
Quinn 5 Grimm, Hoffman 3 A. McLean 2 Hall, Dayman 1	Goals	4 Turner; 3 Nicholls, McInnes; 2 Thoms; 1 Hodgens, Prior, Coverlid
Fletcher, L. McLean, Bunton, A. McLean, McFarlane, Quinn, Hall	Best	R. Roberts, Edwards, Wood, THoms, Nicholls, Turner, Prior

== Post game ==
=== Record attendance ===
The crowd of 47,500 broke the attendance for a football match in South Australia that was previously 44,300 held by the 1924 SAFL Grand Final.

=== Haydn Bunton Sr last game ===
The 1945 SANFL Grand Final was Haydn Bunton Sr's last game.

== Bibliography ==
- Beevor, Antony (2012). The Second World War. London: Weidenfeld & Nicolson. ISBN 978-0-297-84497-6.
