= Melbourne University Cricket Club =

Australian cricket club

The Melbourne University Cricket Club, usually called simply "University", plays the sport of cricket in the elite club competition of Melbourne, Australia, known as Victorian Premier Cricket. The club was founded in 1856 and played its first season of premier cricket in 1906–07. Known as the Students, the club has won three first XI premierships: 1928–29, 1990–91, 1995–96. Its home ground is on the campus of the University of Melbourne in Parkville.

The club's famous players include: Roy Park, Bert Hartkopf, Ted a'Beckett, Keith Rigg, Colin McDonald, George Thoms, Bob Cowper, Paul Sheahan, Jim Higgs, Frank Tyson and Ian Botham.
