= Jim Burke (cricketer) =

Australian cricketer

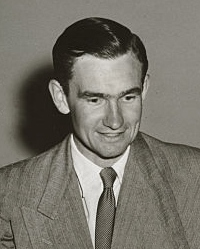
- Burke in 1954

Personal information
- Full name: James Wallace Burke
- Born: 12 June 1930; Mosman, New South Wales
- Died: 2 February 1979 (aged 48); Manly, New South Wales
- Batting: Right-handed
- Bowling: Right-arm offbreak

International information
- National side: Australia
- Test debut (cap 187): 2 February 1951 v England
- Last Test: 13 February 1959 v England

Career statistics
Competition	Tests	First-class
Matches	24	130
Runs scored	1,280	7,563
Batting average	34.59	45.01
100s/50s	3/5	21/35
Top score	189	220
Balls bowled	814	8,540
Wickets	8	101
Bowling average	28.75	29.11
5 wickets in innings	0	3
10 wickets in match	0	0
Best bowling	4/37	6/40
Catches/stumpings	18/0	58/0
- Source: CricInfo

James Wallace Burke (12 June 1930 – 2 February 1979) was an Australian cricketer who played in 24 Test matches from 1951 to 1959. Burke holds the record for the most innings in a complete career without scoring a duck, with 44.

== Early years ==
Burke grew up in the Sydney north shore suburb of Mosman, where his parents had migrated to, from Bromley in Kent, England. His great-uncle Percy Burke had played for Kent as a wicket-keeper. His mother was a talented golfer. Burke was a talented golfer and cricketer in his childhood, but was refused membership of Balgowlah Golf Club at the age of 12 on the grounds that he was too young. He began his cricket training aged seven at Manly Oval. Burke attended Sydney Grammar School and aged 14 played in the First XI. At 15 he rose from Manly's Third XI to First XI in Sydney Grade Cricket. At 16 his batting average for Sydney Grammar was 94, a record for a school which has produced many first-class cricketers.

== First-class debut ==
At the start of the 1948–49 season, Burke scored 134 and took a total of 2/8 for New South Wales Colts—a youth team—against their Queensland counterparts. At the age of 18, this propelled him into his debut for New South Wales in the 1948–49 Sheffield Shield season, even though there was no international touring team during the season and his state was thus at full strength with many Test players. In his first match, Burke scored 76 not out and bowled two wicketless maidens against Western Australia as his state took an innings victory. He then scored half-centuries in his only innings in the next two games, before his form petered out towards the end of the season, failing to pass 40 again and totalling only 46 runs in his last five innings. This included an opportunity in the Test trial match between the strongest players in Australia at the end of the season, as part of Hassett's XI. He scored only 11 and 19, and was not selected for the 1949–50 tour of South Africa. Burke ended his debut season with 336 runs at 37.33 in seven matches, and his occasional bowling yielded three wickets at 39.00, having delivered only 29 overs. His first wickets at first-class level were Victoria's Test batsmen Ken Meuleman and Sam Loxton as he took 2/38 in the second innings of his fifth match.

The following season, with the Test players in South Africa, Burke had more opportunities in the New South Wales team, but he failed to pass 20 in two early-season matches, and was dropped, spending six weeks out of the team before returning in mid-December. Aged 20, he scored 62 and took 3/54 upon his recall against South Australia, and then carried his bat to score for 162 not out against Victoria, whose bowling was headed by Jack Iverson, whose folded-finger spin took 6/27 in a Test the following year. In his five Shield matches for the season, Burke scored 292 runs at 41.71 and seven wickets at 33.42.

Burke was selected for an Australian Second XI that toured New Zealand under the leadership of Bill Brown at the end of the season, with the first-choice team still in South Africa. He started his career for Australia productively, scoring 101 in a non-first-class match against Hutt Valley on debut. Burke then scored 60 and 68 not out in the next match against Auckland—a first-class fixture—before taking 3/24 in the second innings as the hosts held on for a draw with two wickets in hand. He scored 89 in the next match against Waikato—another non-first-class match—but did little else on the tour. He failed to take another wicket and passed 20 only once in his five remaining first-class innings. He made nine in his only innings in the one-off match against New Zealand, which was drawn.

== International debut in 1950–51 ==
The following season, the Test players returned and Burke put in a series a consistent performances to cement his New South Wales position and push for national selection. In the third match of the season, he scored 80 and 60 for his state against the touring MCC team of Freddie Brown, ending unbeaten in both innings. He made a duck in the following match against Victoria, but claimed his maiden five-wicket innings haul, taking 5/38 in the second innings. He removed Test batsmen Meuleman and Loxton before returning to dismiss Test bowlers Ian Johnson and Bill Johnston. Burke then scored half-centuries in consecutive Shield matches and was selected for an Australian XI to play against England in a Test trial. He scored 128 in his only innings and took the wicket of Denis Compton but this was not enough for Test selection. He had another opportunity against England two weeks later in a match for New South Wales, but had to retire hurt in the first innings and then made 40 in the second innings. Burke also removed England's top-scorer Reg Simpson for 259.

He was selected for his Test debut against England at the Adelaide Oval, replacing the out-of-form Loxton for the Fourth Test. Burke made 12 before being bowled by Roy Tattersall in the first innings as Australia took a 99-run lead. He then scored 101 not out in the second innings as Australia made 8/403 and set England 503 for victory. His innings was marked by cutting and glancing. Australia went on to win by 274 runs. He was promoted to opening the batting in the following Test and struggled, making 11 and 1 and being dismissed by English seam spearhead Alec Bedser in each innings as the tourists ended Australia's run of 26 Test without defeat with an eight-wicket win. Burke bowled only three overs in the series, all of them in the second innings of his debut Test, without taking a wicket. He ended the season with 705 runs at 50.35 and took eight wickets at 37.12.

Burke did not have a high-scoring start to the 1951–52 season. After scoring 32 against Queensland, and 11 and 38 not out for New South Wales against the touring West Indies, Burke was made twelfth man for the first two Tests. A late injury to Australian captain Hassett and an Australian Board of Control veto on fellow New South Wales Test opener Sid Barnes for disciplinary reasons, meant that Burke was recalled for the Third Test on a wet Adelaide pitch. He scored only 3 and 15 as the tourists took a six-wicket win. When Hassett returned, Burke was duly dropped and missed the remaining two Tests. He returned to New South Wales and scored fifties in consecutive matches late in the summer; he ended the season with 319 runs at 29.00 and took five wickets at 45.60.

== Test omission ==
Burke then lost his Test position for two seasons. He had a poor campaign in 1952–53, he passed 40 only once in 13 innings in nine matches. This came in an innings victory over Victoria, in which he scored 78 before taking 4/11 in the second innings to help end the game, dismissing Loxton, Ian McDonald, Johnson and Johnston. He aggregated only 277 runs at 25.18 and 12 wickets at 20.75. Burke was overlooked for all five Tests against South Africa and not selected for the 1953 tour of England.

He declined further in the following season, which was purely domestic with the Test representatives available for the whole season. He lost his New South Wales place multiple times, playing in only five matches as his state won the 1953–54 Sheffield Shield, starting a run of nine successive titles. Early in the season, Burke took 6/60 in the second innings of a match against South Australia, removing Gavin Stevens and Phil Ridings before running through the tail, helping to set up an eight-wicket triumph. He scored an unbeaten 58 against Queensland, his only score above 35 for the season, which ended with 171 runs at 24.42 and 10 wickets at 29.30.

== Lancashire League and recall ==
Burke made his come-back by combining business and cricket, moving to England for a season as Todmorden's professional in the Lancashire League in 1954. He failed to manage a century, but did score five half-centuries including two nineties in 23 matches. Burke made 97 not out and then took 8/14 in a win over East Lancashire, his best batting and bowling figures for the whole season. He took five or more wickets in an innings in 11 matches.

Burke started the new Australian season in 1954–55 with 137 against Queensland. He then scored 6 and 34 not out in his state's match against Len Hutton's touring Englishmen. This was not enough for him to gain selection in the First Test, which AUstralia won by an innings. The Australian selectors recalled him for two Tests in the 1954–55 series against England. The first came in the Second Test in Sydney when Keith Miller was injured. Burke scored 44 and 14 as England levelled the series in a low-scoring 38-run win.

He was dropped for the Third Test when Miller returned. He was recalled for the Fourth Test in Adelaide and made 18 and 5 as England sealed the series with a third win in a row. In the final match of the season, Burke scored 62 in the second innings after New South Wales and England had both scored 172 in the first innings. His team went on to take a 45-run win, the only defeat inflicted on the tourists for the summer apart from the First Test. Burke removed Hutton in the run-chase, taking his only wicket for the season. Overall, Burke did not have a successful season, scoring 404 runs at 36.72.

Burke was omitted for the fifth time when left out of the 1955 squad to tour the West Indies. At this stage, he began to take a defensive attitude, trying to eliminate all risk in order to increase his productivity, something that prompted crowd heckling and demonstrations by Sydneysiders when he walked into bat. There was also a Test opener's berth available, as one of the incumbent openers Arthur Morris had retired after returning from the West Indies.

The dour batsman started the 1955–56 season, which was purely domestic, strongly, scoring 85 and 56 in the opening match of the season against Queensland. In his third game of the summer, he made a defensive 189 against Western Australia in Perth, prompting Don Bradman to advise him to utilize more strokeplay. Burke responded, scoring 150 in the next innings, against South Australia, helping to set up an innings win. These strong performances saw Burke called into Lindwall's XI in the Test trial against Johnson's XI. He made 192 in the first innings and was unbeaten on 6 in the second when his team scraped to a two-wicket win. Towards the end of January, he hit 98 and was unbeaten on 57 as New South Wales slumped to 7/121 and avoided a defeat to Victoria when time ran out, helping his state take a third consecutive Shield title. Up to this point in the season, he had only taken 2/125, but he had scored 899 runs at 89.90.

== Wisden Cricketer of the Year and 1956 tour of England ==
Burke's increased strokeplay during the season endeared himself more to the public, and his volume of scoring earned him a place in the Australian squad for the 1956 tour of England. During the tour, he became the regular opening partner to Colin McDonald. In a low-scoring series in a wet summer with spinning pitches which saw England's off spinner Jim Laker, dominate, Burke topped the Test match averages, as well as Australia's first-class aggregate with 1,339 runs in 37 innings.

In the second match of the tour, Burke scored 123 against Leicestershire, but the next month before the Tests was frequently truncated by rain. He only had four completed innings in three matches in that time, and did not pass 20. He went into the Tests with 212 runs at 35.33.

His tour was highlighted by his second innings of 58 not out in the First Test at Trent Bridge in Nottingham, defying the English bowlers for four hours to force a draw on a rain-affected pitch; more than half the playing time was lost to the weather. Between Tests, he made consecutive fifties in county matches and was unbeaten on 37 in his third innings. In the Second Test at Lord's, he put on 151 with McDonald, making 65 to set up an Australian first innings total of 285. The tourists took a lead of 114 and Burke was only able to make 16 in the second innings, but Australia went on to a 185-run victory. With 138 and 125 not out against Somerset before the Third Test, Burke became the first Australian since Alan Kippax in 1930 to score a century in each innings of a match in England.

After this innings, Burke and Australia's fortunes declined. In the Third Test at Headingley, Australia were crushed by an innings and 42 runs, bowled out for 143 and 140. The opener was one of the few to resist, scoring 41 in the first innings and 16 as England levelled the series.

This was followed by the Old Trafford Test dubbed "Laker's Test", Burke was the only Australian to not be dismissed twice by Jim Laker, who took 19 of the 20 wickets; he was dismissed by Tony Lock in the first innings. He scored 22 of Australia's 84 in the first innings and then 33 of 205 in the second innings as the hosts won by an innings and 170 runs to retain the Ashes.

Burke then made 194 on a spinning wicket against Warwickshire, the highest innings of his career to that point, as Australia won by an innings. He then had a lean run for the next month, scoring only 54 runs in six innings in that period. This included eight and one in the Fifth Test at The Oval, dismissed by Laker twice on the latter's Surrey home ground. English captain Peter May set Australia a target of 228 on a rain-affected wicket late on the final day, and they collapsed to 5/27 before a final weather interruption saved them from another defeat.

Burke ended the series with 271 runs at 30.11.

The dominant Laker took two-thirds of Burke's dismissals in the series, but Burke survived the second highest number of deliveries from Laker, behind Neil Harvey. Burke was noted for his strategy of playing back against Laker on spin friendly and wet wickets, fearing that he would be caught by short leg fielders if he played forward.

After a lean month, Burke ended his stay on English soil with 94 and 21 as the Australians ended the tour with a five-wicket win over TN Pearce's XI. He then made 81 and 58 in two non-first-class matches against Scotland. In recognition of his performance on the tour, he was named as one of the five Wisden Cricketers of the Year in 1957.

He then toured India and Pakistan on the return trip to Australia, where the tourists played four Tests with no other tour matches. On this campaign, Burke's batting became increasingly dour. In Australia's inaugural Test against Pakistan in Karachi, Burke made 4 and 10, dismissed both times by Fazal Mahmood as the tourists fell to a nine-wicket defeat. His poor run continued in the First Test against India in Madras, scoring 10 in an innings win. Burke then scored 161 in the Second Test at Bombay in 368 minutes, which remains the slowest by an Australian Test player. The match ended in a draw and Burke struggled again in the deciding Test in Calcutta, falling both times to the spin of Ghulam Ahmed for 10 and 2 on a pitch affected by flooding. He had been dismissed all four times against India by spinners. On the rain-affected pitch in the second innings, Burke took his first wickets in Test cricket, helping Australia to defend their target of 231. He trapped opener Pankaj Roy leg before wicket for 24, and then bowled Gulabrai Ramchand, had Prakash Bhandari caught, and then bowled Ahmed for a duck. He ended with 4/37 as India were dismissed 95 runs short of the victory target.

== Later career ==
The stopover in the subcontinent meant that the Australians arrived home after the start of the 1956–57 season. No Tests were scheduled for the season. Burke started with a pair against Western Australia in his first match back, and then scored only two in the return match, although New South Wales won both games nonetheless. In the next match, he struck 220 of his state's 454 as they completed an innings win over South Australia. Over the Christmas period, Burke was a pivotal figure in the first tie in Sheffield Shield history. In the first innings, he carried his bat to make 132 of New South Wales' 281, giving them a 37-run lead over Victoria. In the second innings, the reigning champions had a target of 161, and Burke had to retire hurt with an injury. New South Wales collapsed to 7/70, forcing the ill captain Ian Craig to raise himself out of bed to bat. The score proceeded to 145, whereupon Burke returned upon the fall of Richie Benaud. Craig fell three runs later with the score at 148. Burke reached 8 and the scores were on 9/160 when he edged Ian Meckiff to wicket-keeper Len Maddocks, ending the match in a tie.

Burke ended the season with 444 runs at 55.50 and three wickets at 39.00 as New South Wales took a fourth consecutive title.

The following year, he toured South Africa in 1957–58. He topped the Australian run scoring aggregate, with 1,041 at an average of 65.06, the only Australian to pass 1000 runs.

The tour started with a stopover in Northern Rhodesia, where Burke scored 102 against the national team in a non-first-class match. The Australians then travelled to Rhodesia where they played two matches against the hosts. He struck 106 in the second innings, setting up a ten-wicket win. Upon entering South African soil, Burke made centuries in consecutive matches, scoring 112 and 133 against Natal and Eastern Province respectively, before adding 72 in the next match against Western Province.

Burke struggled in the First Test, scoring 16 and 10 retired hurt as South Africa held the upper hand for most of the drawn match. However, he recovered in time for the Second Test at Cape Town in the following week. He reverted to his dour, watchful style, and his 189, his highest Test score, took 578 minutes. It laid the foundation for an innings victory after South Africa were forced to follow on. After making 86 against Transvaal, Burke scored 83 in the second innings of the drawn Third Test in Durban. He had made only two in the first innings and Australia were in trouble after the hosts took a 221-run lead, but his second effort helped Australia to 7/292 and avoid defeat. His 81 in the first innings of the Fourth in Johannesburg helped set up a ten-wicket victory, and an unassailable 2–0 series lead. Burke made only eight in the Fifth Test, but Australia were able to seal the series with an eight-wicket win.

During the Tests, Burke took two wickets at 38.50, but his bowling action came under suspicion.

He ended the tour with a successful all-round display against South African Universities. In the first innings, he took 6/40, his career-best bowling figures, bowling four of his victims. He then scored 81, helping Australia to a lead of 179. He took 2/54 in the second innings but was unable to finish off the hosts and secure a victory. The African campaign was Burke's most productive with the ball, taking 21 first-class wickets at 22.28.

== International swansong ==
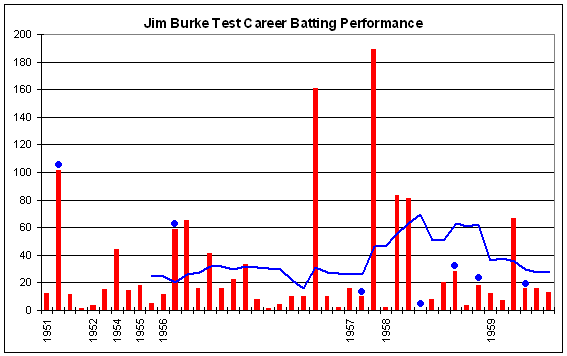
Burke's Test career batting performance.

Burke started the 1958–59 season strongly. He scored 113 and took 3/23 in the opening Shield match of the season against Queensland. After adding a half-century in the following match against Western Australia, he compiled 104 against the touring England team for New South Wales ahead of the Tests.

In the First Test against the England team at Brisbane, he scored 20 in the first innings of a low-scoring and slow match. After Australia had made 186 to take a 52-run lead, English all-rounder Trevor Bailey, notorious for his defensive batting, took 357 minutes to compile the slowest half-century in first-class history.

Australia required 147 on the final day to win, and Burke gave a display similar to Bailey, taking 250 minutes to score 28 not out and anchoring the hosts to an eight-wicket win, scoring less than 20% of the runs added while he was at the crease. Between Tests, Burke scored 53 and 77 in New South Wales' 162-run win over Victoria. Burke then suffered a month of low scores in a run of four matches against the Englishmen. He made 3 and 18 not out in an eight-wicket win in the Second Test in Melbourne, and was then dismissed for 12 and 7 in the drawn Third Test by his old nemesis Laker. In the second innings of the Test, Burke took 2/26 including the wicket of English captain Peter May for 92, and he was frequently accused by the touring journalists of throwing.

His run of low scoring continued in his state's match against England before the Fourth Test. He made 5 and 22 not out, dismissed by Bailey although he did remove his slow-scoring English counterpart with the ball. In the Fourth Test, Burke made 66 in the first innings to help set up a lead of 236 and he was unbeaten on 16 as the Australians sealed the series with a ten-wicket win. He then took 4/52 and 1/19 against Victoria before playing in the Fifth Test, his last match for Australia. He made only 16 and 13, dismissed twice by Frank Tyson, the fastest bowler of the era, as Australia won by nine wickets to take the series 4–0.

Criticised for slow scoring and for his bowling, and declaring himself unwilling to face fast bowling of increasing fierceness, in particular short pitched bowling, and having scored 199 runs at 28.43, Burke retired from all first class cricket suddenly after series. He announced retirement on 5 March 1959.

He played in the two Shield matches after the Tests, scoring 103 and 65 in the penultimate match, a 174-run win over South Australia. He then made five in his final match against Western Australia, which New South Wales won by an innings and completed their sixth consecutive Sheffield Shield title.

He continued to play grade cricket for 13 further seasons and later became a well-known commentator for the Australian Broadcasting Corporation.

== Style and personality ==
Burke was also an off break bowler and took 101 wickets in first-class cricket at an average under thirty. His jerky bent-arm action was considered to be suspect and was no-balled for throwing in grade cricket. His action was likened to a policeman hitting a small offender with a baton. At the height of the "throwing" controversy in 1958–59 he was not risked in Test matches. He was often effective on uncovered wickets in grade cricket, often skittling opposition batting lineups.

Outside the pressure of Test cricket, Burke was an entertaining and attacking batsman, characterised by a clean line, quick movement back or forward and good balance, notably in playing the on-drive. Standing a little under six feet, Burke played with a low grip on his bat with little backlift. He played square-on while on the back foot, with chest facing the bowler, preferring to have his body behind swinging balls rather than the textbook side-on stance. Lantern jawed and poker faced, Burke showed little overt reaction to crowd sentiment over his batting approach, tugging his cap lower before every delivery. He was known for his sense of humour, often enlivening the team with his piano playing and jokes.

== Personal life and death ==
He married Barbara Phyllis Hogbin on 1 May 1952 at St Andrew's Anglican Church, Wahroonga. They had two daughters and two sons. Divorced in August 1967, he married 26-year-old Judith Anne Cameron on 4 September at the registrar general's office, Sydney.

A popular and humorous figure and an honorary life member of the Marylebone Cricket Club, Burke hid personal and financial worries while a member of the regular ABC commentary team for The Ashes Tests. In February 1979, depressed by marital problems, ill health and by the loss of some $153,000 in a 'disastrous gamble on the gold futures market', he purchased a shotgun from a Sydney sporting goods store and killed himself with it. His investments later turned around and would have made him a tidy fortune.
