= John Arlott =

English writer and broadcaster (1914–1991)

John Arlott OBE
- Arlott in a post-war posed BBC shot in 1952
- Born: Leslie Thomas John Arlott; 25 February 1914; Basingstoke, Hampshire, England
- Died: 14 December 1991 (aged 77); Alderney, Channel Islands
- Education: Queen Mary's Grammar School
- Occupations: Journalist and commentator
- Years active: 1946–1980
- Employer(s): BBC, The Guardian
- Known for: Cricket commentator for Test Match Special, writer and wine connoisseur
- Spouses: Dawn Rees (m. 1940; div. 1958) Valerie France (m. 1959; died 1976) Patricia Hoare (m. 1977)
- Children: 3

Leslie Thomas John Arlott OBE (25 February 1914 – 14 December 1991) was an English journalist, author and cricket commentator for the BBC's Test Match Special. He was also a poet and wine connoisseur. With his poetic phraseology, he became a cricket commentator noted for his "wonderful gift for evoking cricketing moments" by the BBC.

== Early life ==
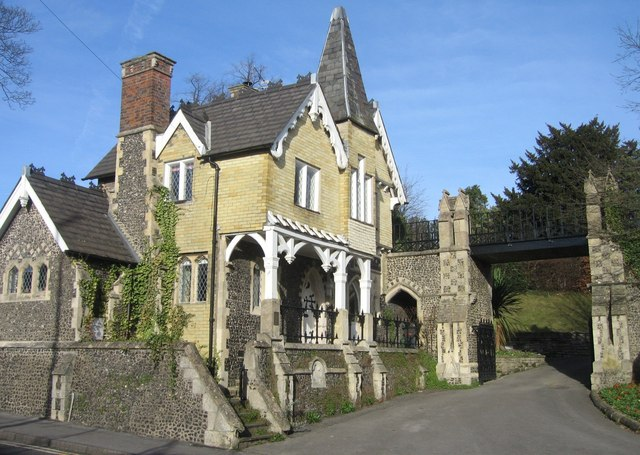
Arlott's birthplace

John Arlott was born in 1914 at Cemetery Lodge, Chapel Hill, Basingstoke in Hampshire, the son of cemetery registrar William John Arlott and Nellie (née Jenvey-Clarke). He attended Fairfields Primary School in Basingstoke before winning a scholarship to Queen Mary's Grammar School. Once at the school, however, he became embroiled in a feud with the headmaster, as the school "had not been wholly receptive to his young, independent, inquiring mind." Arlott eventually left the school of his own accord. He meanwhile showed an early interest in the local cricket matches; in 1926 he watched England and Australia play at The Oval, becoming a fan of Jack Hobbs, and later watched Sussex play Lancashire.

=== Pre-media career 1930–46 ===
After leaving school, following a brief stint at the local town hall where he learned to type, he spent four years working at Park Prewett Mental Hospital in Basingstoke as a records clerk (1930–34). His friend David Rayvern Allen noted that it was there that "he discovered humanity in often dislocated forms, [which] was fundamental to his personal development." This was followed by twelve years as a policeman (1934–1946) in the Southampton County Borough Police Force, which later amalgamated with the Hampshire Constabulary in 1967. He progressed to the rank of sergeant while stationed at Southampton, and enjoyed the opportunity to watch Hampshire play at the County Ground while on duty at Northland Road. Though his cricket skills were not sufficient to play for the Southampton Police cricket XI, he was called upon at times to utilise the PA-system. He also studied Russian language and military history at the library of Southampton University, wrote reports for his chief constable, gave lectures to students, wrote poetry, and took up boxing, at which he was quite proficient.

== First-class cricket experience ==
He played cricket at club level but would spend most of his free summer time following the Hampshire team both home and away. As a result of his regular support he became known to the team and this led to his one and only brief playing exposure to the first-class game. He was watching Hampshire play Kent at Canterbury in August 1938 when they discovered they would be short of a twelfth man for the following game. Being willing and available, young Arlott was co-opted and he travelled with the team to Worcester. Hampshire had had to use three substitute fielders when two of their XI were injured and skipper Cecil Paris suffered a puncture on his way to the ground.

The following day, the match report in the Western Daily Press named one of the substitutes as "Harlott", a local policeman and a Hampshire member. It was quite a notable day in the field, with the Nawab of Pataudi scoring an elegant undefeated century for Worcester in one of his very rare appearances on the county circuit. The match ultimately ended as a draw with Hampshire scoring 313 and 91 – 2 and Worcester 413 – 3 declared. It was Arlott’s one and only appearance in a first class cricket fixture and it proved to be the highlight of his playing career.

In 1980, he was asked whether playing first-class cricket on a regular basis might have provided him with greater insight as a cricket writer. He replied: "My word, I know what the problems are. I've failed at everything."

== Broadcasting ==
=== BBC debut ===
After being invited to make a public radio address to George VI on VE Day, 1945, he attracted the attention of the BBC, and of John Betjeman, who became a mentor for Arlott's poetic ambitions. Arlott subsequently joined the BBC as the Overseas Literary Producer the following year.

He was asked by the Head of the BBC Overseas Service, Donald Stevenson, to commentate on the warm-up games of India's tour of England in 1946. Arlott's commentary "went down very well in India" and he was invited to continue to commentate on further matches, including the Test matches, initiating a 34-year career as a cricket commentator for the BBC. At first he encountered some resentment from his colleagues in the commentary box, initially clashing with EW Swanton, but despite this he rapidly established his own particular niche. From 1946 until he retired at the end of the 1980 season, Arlott covered every single home Test match. He went on only two overseas England tours, to South Africa in 1948–1949 and Australia in 1954–1955.

=== Test Match Special ===
Prior to 1957, BBC radio covered every home Test match, with Arlott normally one of the commentators, but it did not broadcast uninterrupted ball-by-ball commentary. Test Match Special (TMS) was launched on 30 May 1957, providing a full ball-by-ball Test Match commentary service on the medium wave service of the BBC Third Programme. The first match covered was the first Test between England and the West Indies at Edgbaston. The TMS commentators that day were Arlott, Rex Alston and E. W. Swanton, with summaries provided by Ken Ablack, from the West Indies, together with Norman Yardley and Freddie Brown. When he retired in September 1980, he was the longest-serving TMS commentator, equalled by Brian Johnston in 1993 and subsequently exceeded by Christopher Martin-Jenkins.

=== Television commentary ===
Arlott undertook some BBC television cricket commentary, between 1964 and 1968 featuring matches between various counties vs an International Cavaliers X1, which were played on Sundays with 25 overs per side and then primarily on the Sunday League from 1969 to 1980. These John Player Sunday League limited over fixtures were 40 overs a side and were usually played between 2.00 pm and 6.30 pm. Arlott commentated on the first 20 overs of each innings with Jim Laker usually covering the last 20. He also briefly wrote, directed and narrated a topical local series for the BBC called ABC of the South in the 1960s but radio was his true metier.

=== Commentating style ===
"We've for a freaker down the wicket now, not very shapely and it's masculine. And I would think that it's seen the last of its cricket for the day... He's being embraced by a blond policeman, and this may be his last public appearance, but what a splendid one."

— Arlott commentating on the arrival of a streaker.

Arlott was a popular commentator partly because of his gift for poetic phraseology. The BBC commented that "the style of commentary owed much to the poet in John. He would relish the phrases he used to describe what he saw and leave his colleagues wishing they could have thought of them," while Wisden wrote: "it is his unique gift for cricket commentary which will bring him lasting fame... His commentary technique was strongly influenced by his poetic sense. With the economy of a poet he could describe a piece of play without fuss or over-elaboration, being always conscious of its rhythm and mindful of its background. He was never repetitive or monotonous, except for effect. The listener's imagination was given free rein."

One comment often noted was made during the 1975 Cricket World Cup final, in which West Indian captain Clive Lloyd scored a century: Arlott described one shot by Lloyd as "the stroke of a man knocking a thistle top off with a walking stick." On England's 1948–9 tour to South Africa, the England captain George Mann was bowled by his namesake Tufty Mann. Arlott memorably described it as "a case of Mann's inhumanity to Mann". He also had the advantage of a very distinctive voice. Frank Keating wrote of his "articulate, leisurely, confiding countryman's burr". Keating also compared his stature as a radio journalist with those of Richard Dimbleby and Alistair Cooke.

=== Final Test Match ===
Arlott's final Test commentary was on the Centenary Test between England and Australia at Lord's in 1980. At the end of his last session on the final day (2 September), he concluded with his customary phrasing "nine runs off the over – 28 Boycott, 15 Gower, 69 for 2 – and after Trevor Bailey it will be Christopher Martin-Jenkins." At the end of the following over, a public address announcement that Arlott had completed his final commentary session prompted the crowd to give Arlott an ovation. The entire Australian team in the field and the two England batsmen joined in, with Geoffrey Boycott removing his batting gloves to applaud. Later that day, after the match ended in a draw, he came onto the Lord's balcony to present the Man of the Match award. When he appeared, the crowd below again burst into a spontaneous ovation that lasted for several minutes before he was finally able to speak and make the presentation to Kim Hughes.

Four days later, Arlott returned to Lord's for his last commentary, covering the 1980 Gillette Cup final.

== Writer ==
Arlott was a stylish writer, contributing regularly as a journalist and also writing the occasional hymn, of which the best-known is "God Whose Farm is All Creation", sung at harvest festival. Two others were "By the rutted roads we follow" for Plough Sunday and "We watched the winter turn its back" for Rogation. As his interest in wine developed he wrote two books on that subject; he also wrote poetry, considering his best poem to be the one dedicated to Sir Jack Hobbs on the latter's 70th birthday. Well-versed in cricket history, Arlott was often viewed as a leading authority, especially on the literature of the game. He wrote annual reviews of the year's cricket books for Wisden for every year from 1950 until 1992, except for 1979 and 1980. He also wrote a well received appreciation of Neville Cardus for the 1965 edition. He wrote articles on cricket art and history for the encyclopaedia Barclays World of Cricket.

He had many books published, including: Of Period and Place, a book of poetry (1944); Indian Summer (1946); Concerning Cricket (1949); Maurice Tate (1951); Test Match Diary (1953); Vintage Summer (1967); Fred – Portrait of a Fast bowler (1971); A Hundred Years of County Cricket (1973); John Arlott's book of cricketers (1979); Jack Hobbs: Profile of the Master (1981) and Basingstoke Boy: The Autobiography (1989). A Word From Arlott and Arlott in Conversation were published in 1983 and 1984 respectively as collections of his commentaries and writings. He was also the narrator and technical advisor for the documentary short film Cricket (1950).

=== Biographical writings about Arlott ===
- Basingstoke Boy: Autobiography, by John Arlott, published 1992.
- Arlott: The Authorised Biography, by David Rayvern Allen, published in 1993, won The Cricket Society Jubilee Literary Award.
- John Arlott, A Memoir, written by his son Tim Arlott, was published in 1994.
- Arlott, Swanton and the Soul of English Cricket, by Stephen Fay and David Kynaston, 2018. This is a joint biography with the other great English cricket writer of the period, E.W. Swanton. It compares and contrasts their different views about cricket and its place in the world.

=== Journalism ===
His career in journalism began with the Evening News in 1950. In 1955 he switched to the News Chronicle, where he stayed until the paper folded in 1960. He began reporting football matches for The Observer in 1958. He also wrote occasional articles for The Times. Arlott joined The Guardian in 1968 as chief cricket correspondent, where he would stay until 1980. He was also asked to comment on football matches. He was assigned at his own request to cover the Manchester United v Red Star Belgrade European Cup match in Yugoslavia. At the last minute their chief soccer correspondent Donny Davies pulled rank and decided to go instead. The aircraft bringing back the team, officials and press crashed in what became known as the Munich air disaster and Davies was one of the fatalities. Arlott stopped covering soccer in 1977 after some violent post match incidents with hooligan fans.

=== Cricket Writers' Club ===
He became an early member of the Cricket Writers' Club, founded in 1947, whose dinners in those days were lavish affairs and often held in liveried halls. Basil Easterbrook, chairman in 1965, recalled an attempt to ban drinking until after the AGM which normally preceded the annual dinner. "There was much noise, calls for order and the singing of a ribald chorus of 'On Rosenwater's doorstep, down Leytonstone way' to the tune of Mother Kelly. Irving Rosenwater was a leading member at that time and some of the club's elder statesmen were angry enough to walk out. John Arlott was the chairman at that meeting and, as was his custom, had taken the odd sip of wine. John tried hard to bring some order to the proceedings by banging the table with a spoon, but he missed the table."

=== Working abroad ===
Ramchandra Guha, wrote about the interaction Arlott had with Vijay Merchant; he described Arlott's background with the "prejudices of a conventional British upbringing." In 1946, Arlott asked Merchant "whether in view of the ongoing sectarian violence, India really deserved independence. Should not the white man, he said, stay on to secure the peace?" Guha wrote that "...Friendship with Merchant broadened his social and political horizons". In 1948, he travelled to South Africa to cover the England cricket team's tour for the BBC, and openly voiced his distaste for the country's apartheid policy. When asked to mark his race on an immigration form – whether "white, Indian, coloured, black", Arlott wrote "human".

Arlott visited Australia during the winter of 1954–55, to cover the successful defence of The Ashes by the team led by Len Hutton. His next and last overseas assignment as a cricket commentator was over 20 years later for the BBC in Australia to commentate on the 1977 Centenary match where he described "the seagulls standing in line like vultures for Lillee".

== Other cricket involvement ==
=== D'Oliveira affair ===
Basil D'Oliveira was a South African who was classified as a Cape Coloured by the apartheid regime and consequently was ineligible to play first-class cricket. He wrote to Arlott in the late 1950s, after hearing his radio commentaries, because "his voice and the words he spoke convinced me he was a nice, compassionate man". He wanted help to find an opportunity to play professional cricket in England and Arlott finally got him a summer contract with Middleton Cricket Club in the Central Lancashire Cricket League in 1960. Arlott subsequently said that this was the achievement in his career of which he felt most proud. After topping the Central Lancashire League batting averages in his first season he subsequently graduated to the first-class county circuit with Worcestershire in 1964. D'Oliveira acquired British nationality the following year and was selected to play for England, making his Test debut against the West Indies at Lord's in June 1966.

During the 1968 Ashes series, D'Oliveira scored 158 on his recall to the England side in the 5th Test Match at The Oval, which seemed to make his selection for the winter tour to South Africa a certainty. However, when the touring side was announced he was controversially omitted amidst allegations of South African political interference with the selection committee. Arlott was incensed and condemned the selectors' decision in his press articles and publicly stated that he would not commentate on any matches involving the South African team during their scheduled tour of England in 1970. Arlott received support from many people over his uncompromising stand, including future England captain Mike Brearley, who called for the cessation of all South African tours, and the Reverend David Sheppard, who had been one of the first players to speak out against apartheid and who had also previously refused to play against the 1960 South African touring side. However, Arlott was subjected to some strong, not entirely unexpected, criticism from the English cricket establishment over his stance particularly by the former England captain Peter May, a Test selector, who wrote directly to him condemning the position that he had adopted.

When Tom Cartwright subsequently had to drop out of the touring side because of an injury, D'Oliveira was selected as his replacement, which led to the tour being cancelled by the South African government. The subsequent South African 1970 tour to England was also cancelled and they were then ostracised by the other Test playing countries. South Africa were then officially excluded from Test cricket for 21 years until they were reinstated by the ICC in 1991 following the South African government's legalisation of the ANC and the release of Nelson Mandela.

=== Cambridge Union Debate ===
Following the cancellation of the 1968 England tour by the South African government, the Cambridge Union decided to hold a debate on the motion "That politics should not intrude on sporting contacts". Former England captain Ted Dexter was invited to propose the motion, seconded by veteran all-round sportsman Wilf Wooller who had skippered Glamorgan to their first county championship in 1948. Both of these ex-players were friends of Arlott. Opposing the motion were the incumbent minister for sport, Denis Howell, seconded by Arlott.

Arlott spoke passionately against the motion stating that "It is political commitment and political belief that can make a man think that his opponent's views are so obnoxious that he will abstain from playing any game with him as a protest against what the other man believes. Any man's political commitment, if it is deep enough, is his very personal philosophy and it governs his whole way of life, it governs his belief, and it certainly governs the people with whom he is prepared to mix." The motion was duly defeated by 334–160. Despite their opposing positions over the issue, Arlott was drinking with Wooller in the Cambridge Union Bar shortly after the debate had finished.

Arlott maintained his strong views on the issue and two years later he came to an unprecedented agreement with the BBC to be excused from commentating on the upcoming Test series against South Africa in England without prejudicing his future commentary role on Test matches against other touring teams in subsequent years. However, the British government subsequently cancelled the tour over public order concerns at each Test venue. A Rest of the World side, captained by Gary Sobers and including five South African team members, played a five-match 'Test' series instead, with Arlott rejoining the TMS commentary team to cover those matches.

=== Friendship with Ian Botham ===
Ian Botham:

"I met John when I was 17 and took his picnic basket up to the commentary box. There were four bottles of Beaujolais in that basket. Being a cider-boy I thought wine was a namby-pamby drink. But I was gripped as John started talking to me, this dumb yokel, about wine. His command of English just rolled off him. He got out some cheese and said this goes best with that wine. 'Go on,' he'd say, have a taste.' Our incredible friendship started and he became my mentor. These days they call 'em life-gurus or some such crap."

Botham also had a holiday home nearby in Alderney and during the last seven years of Arlott's life they often had two meals a day together when he was staying on the island.

"At six minutes past nine every morning the phone would ring. John would say, 'C'mon over – and bring your thirst with you.' At the end when the emphysema took over and he was struggling with speech he had an oxygen mask and I often had to empty his bag for him. But he liked me being there because I knew to wait and let him finish his sentences between gasps. I didn't try to say the words for him because I knew how much they mattered. That was strange for me – to be patient and quiet. But I always wanted to listen to John."

On New Year's Day 1992, Botham and his wife instigated a family tradition of breaking open a bottle of Beaujolais at Arlott's grave and toasting his memory.

=== Presidency of the Cricketers' Association ===
He was a great advocate of county cricket and its players. He became President of the Cricketers' Association in 1968, which aimed to raise salaries and improve the conditions of employment of the county cricketer. Wisden noted that

"democratic views and wise counsel earned him much respect in the cricket world and among the players. His moderation and tact helped in some tight corners, notably at the time of the Packer Affair, when he strove to keep the Cricketers' Association neutral."

=== Master's Club ===
Arlott had developed a close friendship with Sir Jack Hobbs, who ran a sports shop in Fleet Street after his retirement from cricket. Arlott's admiration and respect led him to establish the Master's Club to honour his birthday, on 16 December. The inaugural lunch was held in 1953 at a restaurant in Fleet Street and was attended by John Marshall (London Evening News), Kenneth Adam (BBC) and Alf Gover (Surrey). Membership of the club increased over the years and the annual lunch was eventually moved to the Long Room at The Oval. Despite the demise of all of the original members, it still thrives and continues to meet for lunch every year either on, or close to, Hobbs' 16 December birthday. In keeping with tradition, the lunch always consists of Sir Jack's favourite meal, roast lamb followed by apple pie.

=== Dream Desert Island XI ===
Arlott's dream team contained seven Englishmen, three West Indians and only one Australian. The team in probable batting order was: Jack Hobbs, Mike Brearley, Vivian Richards, Learie Constantine, Ted Dexter, Ian Botham, Keith Miller, Wilfred Rhodes, George Brown (WK), Jim Laker and Wes Hall. The reserves were Basil D'Oliveira, Doug Wright, Leo Harrison (WK) and Frank Tyson.

He was also invited in 1981 to select his Best XI from players who, for a wide variety of reasons, were never capped by England. His team was John Langridge (Sussex), Maurice Hallam (Leicestershire), Emrys Davies (Glamorgan), Edgar Oldroyd (Yorkshire), Jack Newman (Hampshire), Harry Martyn (WK) (Somerset), Peter Sainsbury (Hampshire), Wilf Wooller (Captain) (Glamorgan), Don Shepherd (Glamorgan), Charles Kortright (Essex) and Tom Wass (Nottinghamshire). "The side bats down to No. 7. There are seven bowlers...it has at least six good catchers and a number of cricketers of competitive quality and good temperament: and it would be good to watch."

== Other interests ==
=== Wine connoisseur ===
During a stopover in Sicily in 1949, on his return journey from South Africa, Arlott tasted wine for the first time at the age of 35. From that day he eschewed beer and spirits and devoted himself to cultivating his love of wine. The following year, after recommending some wine to John Marshall, the editor of the London Evening News, he was invited to write a weekly wine column for that newspaper and this resulted in invitations to press tours of French wine regions.

In due course he became a connoisseur of wine, and was often accompanied by some good claret to help lubricate his voice through a day of cricket commentating. He subsequently wrote a regular wine column for The Guardian newspaper and he also published two books, Burgundy Vines and Wines co-written with Christopher Fielden in 1976, and Arlott on Wine in 1987. Before retiring to Alderney, he auctioned his well-stocked wine cellar containing many fine clarets, at Sotheby's.

=== Politics ===
"Say that cricket has nothing to do with politics and you say that cricket has nothing to do with life."

— Arlott on politics.

Arlott espoused strong liberal and humanitarian political views and he stood as the Liberal candidate for Epping in both the 1955 and 1959 general elections, coming third on both occasions but achieving strong support at a time when the Liberals were weak nationally. He appeared frequently on the radio programme Any Questions?, on which panellists debate topical issues of the day.

Reviewing John Arlott: Cricket's Radical Voice, broadcast on BBC Radio 4 to mark the twentieth anniversary of his death, Gillian Reynolds wrote in The Daily Telegraph of "Arlott's independence, his Englishness, sense of fairness and justice, sympathy for the underdog and relish for the beautiful and the good".

=== Desert Island Discs ===
Arlott was twice invited to appear on Desert Island Discs with Roy Plomley, in May 1953 and again in May 1975.

In May 1953 he selected: "Lord Lovel" by Robert Irwin; "Land of My Fathers" by Crowd at Wales V Ireland Rugby Match, 12 March 1949; "These Foolish Things" by Greta Keller; "The foggy, foggy dew" by Benjamin Britten; "Bella figlia dell'amore" (from Rigoletto) by Giuseppe Verdi; "Little Sir William" by Benjamin Britten; "In Dulci Jubilo" by Choir of King's College, Cambridge; Symphony No. 7 in A major by Ludwig van Beethoven; his luxury item was a second-hand bookshop.

In May 1975 he selected Melody in F major, Op. 3/1 by Anton Rubinstein; "Mercy Pourin' Down" by Edric Connor; "Kalinka" by Don Cossacks; "Fern Hill" by Dylan Thomas (his nominated favourite); "To Lizbie Brown" by Gerald Finzi; "Buttercup Joe" by The Yetties; "Go Down You Red Red Roses" by Burl Ives; and "The Boars" by the Elizabeth Singers; his luxury item was champagne.

== Awards ==
He was appointed Officer of the Order of the British Empire in the 1970 New Year Honours. He was made a life member of the MCC in 1980. He won the Sports Journalist of the Year Award in 1979, and was Sports Presenter of the Year in 1980. In July 1973 the University of Southampton awarded him an honorary degree, and in June 1981 he was afforded the same honour by The Open University. His contribution to British radio is commemorated in The Radio Academy's Hall of Fame.

== Personal life ==
Arlott was married three times: his first wife was Dawn Rees (married 18 May 1940 – divorced 1958), with whom he had two sons, James Andrew (1944–1965) and Timothy Mark (born 1950). His second wife was Valerie France (married July 1960 – died 1976), with whom he had a third son Robert, (born 1963), after a daughter named Lynne had died at birth the previous year. His third wife was Patricia Hoare (6 April 1977 – 1991) who survived him. Arlott's eldest son Jim was killed in a car accident on New Year's Eve 1965, driving home late at night from Southampton in a sports car which Arlott had helped him to buy. This tragedy resulted in Arlott always wearing a black tie in remembrance of his son and in penance for his own role in the tragedy.

== Retirement and later life ==
He retired as a cricket commentator at the end of the 1980 season. "The decision was freely taken; and although it was not easy to go, was a better choice than, one day, being told to go." Four days after the Centenary Test at Lord's ended in a draw, Arlott made his very last commentary, covering the Gillette Cup Final between Surrey and Middlesex for BBC Radio 3.

Leaving New Alresford in 1981, after 20 years, he moved to The Vines on Alderney in the Channel Islands. His health was fragile and he suffered from emphysema and chronic bronchitis after years of smoking.

=== Death ===
He died in his sleep in the early morning on Saturday 14 December 1991 and was buried in the island cemetery. Engraved on his headstone were two lines from one of his own poems (originally dedicated to Andrew Young): "So clear you see those timeless things, That, like a bird, the vision sings".

=== Memorial trust ===
The Princess Royal, as President of the Rural Housing Trust, gave a reception at Buckingham Palace on 10 February 1993 to launch the John Arlott Memorial Trust in conjunction with the National Playing Fields Association. The trust was a tribute to Arlott's memory in creating a fund to provide affordable village housing and recreational areas in some of England's 8,000 villages and it is now a national charity chaired by former newscaster Sir Trevor McDonald. The annual charity dinner is sponsored by the Rioja Wine Exporters Group reflecting his great fondness for that particular wine.

=== New Alresford memorial ===
Arlott had originally bought the former pub in New Alresford in 1961. It had originally been called The Sun Inn prior to its closure in 1958, but he renamed it The Old Sun. He completely renovated the interior, especially the large cellar for his collection of fine wine. He also became active in the local community becoming President of the newly founded Alresford Historical and Literary Society in 1966 until he relocated to Alderney 15 years later.

Subsequently, at a ceremony on 21 June 2009, a plaque commemorating his 20 years of living at the Old Sun between 1961 and 1981 was unveiled by his sons Tim and Robert Arlott. The plaque was funded by The Cricket Society and the guest of honour, who cut the ceremonial cake, was his oldest friend Leo Harrison (then 87). This was followed by an inaugural local village cricket competition, with participating teams from Tichborne, Old Alresford, Ropley and Cheriton, for the annual John Arlott Cup.

=== Memorable quotes by Arlott ===
The Times newspaper in March 2006 published a list of 25 favourite sporting quotes – these two Arlottisms were included:

Bradman out for a duck: "Hollies pitches the ball up slowly and ... he's bowled... Bradman bowled Hollies, nought ... bowled Hollies nought ... and what do you say under these circumstances? I wonder if you see the ball very clearly in your last Test in England, on a ground where you've played some of the biggest cricket in your life and where the opposing side has just stood round you and given you three cheers, and the crowd has clapped you all the way to the wicket. I wonder if you see the ball at all." (1948)

We have a freaker: "We have got a freaker [sic] down the wicket now, not very shapely as it is masculine, and I would think it has seen the last of its cricket for the day ... he has had his load, he is being embraced by a blond policeman and this may well be his last public appearance – but what a splendid one!" (1975)

Other Arlott quotes:
"Australianism' means single-minded determination to win – to win within the laws but, if necessary, to the last limit within them. It means where the 'impossible' is within the realm of what the human body can do, there are Australians who believe that they can do it – and who have succeeded often enough to make us wonder if anything is impossible to them. It means they have never lost a match – particularly a Test match – until the last run is scored or their last wicket down." (1949)[15]

"I'm going while people are still asking me why I'm going rather than thinking why doesn't he go." (1980)

"In 1980, Trevor Bailey and the writer were largely responsible for a fresh cricket commentary noise, the popping of champagne corks. The senior men and BBC representatives......have all been temperate men, not teetotallers but as a rule disinclined to take wine – or any other alcoholic drink – during the course of the working day....Latterly though, Brian Johnston has been coaxed round by way of Pouilly Fume to the occasional hock and now, fizz. The others have required little persuasion." (1981)

"I owe almost everything to Neville. I remember reading 'The Summer Game' when I was in my teens. Suddenly, my eyes were opened to this semi-mythology of cricketers and always said to Neville that any success I had was due to the imaginative stimulus he gave me." – his view of Neville Cardus.

=== Memorable quotes about Arlott ===
"The very personification of cricket." Prime Minister John Major, 1991

"He was cricket, there has never been a commentator like him and there never will be." Ian Botham, former England Captain, 1991

"I think that he spread the gospel about cricket around the world more than anyone else." Brian Johnston, fellow commentator, 1991

"A man of deep humanity." David Frith, editor of Wisden Cricket Monthly, 1992

"He was generous with his time in the company of friends. I once sat down to Sunday lunch with John, his family and some friends at two o'clock, and we did not get up from the table until ten at night." Mike Brearley, 1992

"Johnston provided the life, Arlott the soul." Paul Coupar writing about the history of TMS on its 50th anniversary 2007

== Biographies ==
Arlott: The Authorised Biography, by David Rayvern Allen, published in 1993, won The Cricket Society Jubilee Literary Award. A second biography, John Arlott, A Memoir, written by his son Tim Arlott, was published in 1994.
