= Dingbat (disambiguation) =

A dingbat is an ornament or spacer used in typesetting, sometimes more formally known as a "printer's ornament".

Dingbat or dingbats might also refer to:

- Dingbat, slang term referring to someone silly, notably applied to the TV character Edith Bunker by her husband
- Dingbats (board game), a board game requiring players to solve rebuses, known in America as Whatzit?
  - dingbat, another word for rebus derived from the game
- Dingbat (building), a type of cheap urban apartment building built between the 1950s and 1960s
- Dingbat, a paddle ball in South Africa
- Dingbat, a character created by Paul Terry
- The characters in The Dingbat Family, a comic strip drawn by George Herriman from 1910 to 1916
- Dingbat, a cartoon character who co-starred in Heathcliff and Dingbat
- Dingbat, slang term, used as an alternate name for the Dignity Battalions
- Dingbat, a placeholder name for a random or unknown object
- Dingbats (Unicode block), a Unicode block
- Ornamental Dingbats, a Unicode block
- Webdings
- Wingdings

== See also ==
- The Dingbats of Danger Street, a DC Comics kids' team created by Jack Kirby
