= Edgar Oldroyd =

English cricketer

Edgar Oldroyd (1 October 1888 – 29 December 1964) was an English first-class cricketer, who played for Yorkshire County Cricket Club between 1919 and 1931. John Arlott commented in 1981 that "one credited Edgar Oldroyd of Yorkshire with being 'the best sticky-wicket batsman in the world'".

Born in Healey, Batley, Yorkshire, England, Oldroyd was a right-handed batsman, who played 383 games for his county, and one further first-class game. He made a total of 15,925 runs at an average of 35.15, with thirty six hundreds. He also took 203 catches. His right arm off break and medium bowling took 42 wickets at an average of 39.47.

Oldroyd died in Truro, Cornwall, in December 1964, aged 76.
