= Stanley Cox (footballer) =

Australian rules footballer

Stan Cox

Personal information
- Full name: Stanley Cox
- Position: Defender

Playing career^{1}
| Years | Club | Games (Goals) |
| 1940-1947 | West Torrens | 149 (13) |
| Total | | 149 (13) |

Representative team honours^{2}
| Years | Team | Games (Goals) |
| 1941-47 | South Australia | 4 |
- ^{1} Playing statistics correct to the end of 1947.^{2} Representative statistics correct as of 1947.

Career highlights
- Premiership player 1945; West Torrens Best and Fairest 1940

Stan Cox was an Australian rules footballer for the West Torrens Football Club during the 1940s. On one occasion following a heavy kick to the jaw, a semi-conscious and dazed Cox made the news for tackling teammate Ray Roberts.
