= Mal Drury =

Australian rules footballer, born 1910

Personal information
- Full name: Malvern Parker Drury
- Born: 6 April 1910; Hindmarsh, South Australia
- Died: 19 August 1993 (aged 83); Semaphore Park, South Australia
- Original team: West Torrens
- Height: 173 cm (5 ft 8 in)
- Weight: 68 kg (150 lb)

Playing career^{1}
Years	Club	Games (Goals)
1931-33, 35-37, 41	West Torrens	78 (111)
1934	Hawthorn	15 (12)
- ^{1} Playing statistics correct to the end of 1941.

Malvern Parker Drury (6 April 1910 – 19 August 1993) was an Australian rules footballer who played for Hawthorn in the Victorian Football League (VFL) and West Torrens in the South Australian National Football League (SANFL).

Drury was a member of the West Torrens premiership team of 1933 and topped their goal-kicking with 34 majors for the year. The following season he was picked up by Hawthorn, coached by Bill Twomey, Sr., and played 15 of a possible 18 games.

He then returned to West Torrens and was made club captain in 1937, before being appointed coach in 1940. Drury oversaw two poor seasons but when the war induced three year recess ended, steered West Torrens to a surprise premiership in 1945. After winning both the Semi Final and Preliminary Final by a kick, the former due to a controversial goal from Jim Thoms, West Torrens took on Port Adelaide in the decider. Having lost just twice during the season, Port Adelaide were the favourites but West Torrens, despite conceding eight first quarter goals, won by 13 points.

Mal Parker died in 1993 and is buried in Enfield Memorial Park.
