= Henry Martyn (cricketer) =

English cricketer

Personal information
- Born: 16 July 1877; Lifton, Devon, England
- Died: 8 August 1928 (aged 51); Dawlish, Devon, England
- Batting: Right-handed
- Role: Wicket-keeper

Domestic team information
- Years: Team
- 1901–1908: Somerset
- 1899–1900: Oxford University
- 1898: Cornwall
- First-class debut: 15 May 1899 Oxford University v AJ Webbe's XI
- Last First-class: 27 August 1908 Somerset v Surrey

Career statistics
Competition	First-class
Matches	97
Runs scored	3740
Batting average	24.60
100s/50s	1/25
Top score	130*
Balls bowled	153
Wickets	2
Bowling average	71.50
5 wickets in innings	0
10 wickets in match	0
Best bowling	1/19
Catches/stumpings	116/49
- Source: CricketArchive, 28 February 2010

Henry Martyn (16 July 1877 – 8 August 1928) was an English cricketer who made 97 first-class appearances for Oxford University and Somerset between 1899 and 1908. He is described in his Wisden obituary as "one of the finest wicket-keepers ever seen in first-class cricket". In his 1981 article, John Arlott selected Martyn as the best English wicket-keeper never to play for England.

== Cricket career ==
After an education at Exeter Grammar School, where he played two matches for Devon against the Marylebone Cricket Club (MCC) in August 1896 and 1897, Martyn went up to Exeter College, Oxford. He played in the freshman's match in 1897, and played as part of the university eleven in 1899 and 1900. His performance in his first match for the university, against A J Webbe's XI, led Wisden to note that "it was obvious that a great wicketkeeper had been discovered". In this match, which Oxford University won by an innings and 85 runs, Martyn made two stumpings and took two catches. While at Oxford, Martyn made his first appearance for the Gentlemen in the Gentlemen v Players fixture, taking two catches. In total, Martyn made 15 appearances for Oxford University, making four half-centuries and making twelve stumpings. He made two performances against Oxford University in 1901, representing AJ Webbe's XI in May, and a few weeks later made his debut for Somerset against his old team.

Martyn didn't appear again for Somerset until July 1902, when he was part of the team to face the touring Australians, a match in which he played as a specialist batsman, making a half-century in the first-innings. He played regular county cricket for Somerset from 1902 until 1906, averaging 24.86 with the bat in 74 matches. Martyn's top-score in first-class cricket came in a 1905 match against the Australians, when opening the batting whilst following-on, he made an unbeaten 130. He was praised for his performance in the Gentlemen v Players match in 1906, when he stood up to the stumps to the fast bowlers Walter Brearley and Neville Knox. Although he retired from first-class cricket at the conclusion of the 1906 season, he returned to play one last match for the county in 1908 for Len Braund's benefit match.
