= Ian Hamilton McDonald =

Australian cricketer (1923–2019)

Ian McDonald
Personal information
- Full name: Ian Hamilton McDonald
- Born: 28 July 1923; Windsor, Victoria, Australia
- Died: 5 February 2019 (aged 95); Kew, Victoria, Australia
- Batting: Right-handed
- Role: Wicket-keeper
- Relatives: Colin McDonald (brother); Keith Rigg (cousin)

Domestic team information
- Years: Team
- 1948/49–1952/53: Victoria

Career statistics
Competition	First-class
Matches	40
Runs scored	843
Batting average	16.86
100s/50s	0/1
Top score	54
Catches/stumpings	78/53
- Source: Cricinfo, 18 July 2019

Ian Hamilton McDonald (28 July 1923 – 5 February 2019) was an Australian paediatrician who pioneered paediatric anaesthesia and intensive care at the Royal Children's Hospital, Melbourne. He was also a cricketer. He played 40 first-class cricket matches for Victoria between 1948 and 1953 as a wicket keeper.
