= Peter Loader =

English cricketer and umpire

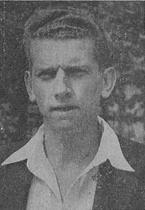

Personal information
- Full name: Peter James Loader
- Born: 25 October 1929; Wallington, Surrey, England
- Died: 15 March 2011 (aged 81); Perth, Western Australia
- Batting: Right-handed
- Bowling: Right-arm fast

International information
- National side: England
- Test debut: 12 August 1954 v Pakistan
- Last Test: 31 December 1958 v Australia

Domestic team information
- Years: Team
- 1951–1963: Surrey
- 1963/64: Western Australia

Career statistics
Competition	Test	First-class
Matches	13	371
Runs scored	76	2,314
Batting average	5.84	8.50
100s/50s	0/0	0/2
Top score	17	81
Balls bowled	2,662	62,522
Wickets	39	1326
Bowling average	22.51	19.04
5 wickets in innings	1	70
10 wickets in match	0	13
Best bowling	6/36	9/17
Catches/stumpings	2/–	119/–
- Source: Cricinfo, 21 January 2017

Peter James Loader (25 October 1929 – 15 March 2011) was an English cricketer and umpire, who played thirteen Test matches for England. He played for Surrey and Beddington Cricket Club. A whippet-thin fast bowler with a wide range of pace and a nasty bouncer, he took the first post-war Test hat-trick as part of his 6 for 36 against the West Indies at Headingley in 1957. It was only the twelfth hat-trick ever taken in Test cricket, and it was another 38 years before Dominic Cork became the next England bowler to take one.

The cricket writer, Colin Bateman, remarked that Loader was, "angular, accurate and with an aversion to breaking down".

== Life and career ==
Loader was born in Wallington, Surrey.

He was an important part of Surrey's attack, helping them to achieve their run of seven successive County Championship titles from 1952 to 1958. He made his debut in 1951, and cemented his place in July 1953, when in three successive matches he took 34 wickets.

Because of the talent of Frank Tyson, Fred Trueman and Brian Statham, Loader was in and out of the England team and toured Australia in 1954–55 without playing in any of the Tests. He bowled consistently well and took 26 wickets (19.50) on the 1958–59 tour, but only took seven wickets (27.57) in what was his last Test series. He suffered from sunstroke in an early match and had to retire from the field, and was unfit to play in the next game. He retired from the Australian XI match with a strained Achilles tendon, and spent several days in bed with a high temperature, but still played in the First Test in the following week. He had a groin strain which kept him out of the New South Wales game and the following Fourth Test. He and Statham were in a car crash before the Fifth Test, and both missed the New Zealand leg of the tour. Loader never played for England again. Loader was accused of "chucking" although he was never called by an umpire because his bouncers were noticeably faster than his normal delivery. Frank Tyson wrote "His inexplicable wide range of pace has from time to time, raised the suspicion of a 'kink' in his action. He can certainly generate a great deal of speed for a man who is of slender build".

He twice took nine wickets in an innings for Surrey: 9 for 23 against Kent in 1953 and 9 for 17 against Warwickshire in 1958. On seven occasions he took one hundred or more first-class wickets in a season, the last time in 1962.

Though not much of a batsman, he made his highest score of 81 against Yorkshire at Headingley in 1955. He came in with the score at 119 for 8, and his innings enabled Surrey to recover to 268 all out.

He emigrated to Perth, Western Australia, in 1963, so ending his career with Surrey. He played one match for the state side in 1963–4, his final first-class appearance. He subsequently took up umpiring. Loader retired from umpiring at the top grade for the Western Australian Cricket Association (WACA) in 2007.

Loader died in Perth, Western Australia in March 2011, at the age of 81.

== Sources ==
- Derlien, Tony: Bowled Statham. Breedon Books (1990).
