= Alfred Wormald =

English cricketer

Alfred Wormald (10 May 1855 – 6 February 1940) was an English first-class cricketer, who played in seven matches for Yorkshire County Cricket Club between 1885 and 1891.

Born in Morley, Yorkshire, Wormald was a wicket-keeper. He took ten catches and completed two stumpings. He also scored 161 runs as a right-handed batsman at an average of 20.12. By far his best innings was his knock of 80 against Gloucestershire in 1888. W. G. Grace scored 148 and 153 in the same drawn game.

Wormald died in February 1940, in Gomersal, Yorkshire, aged 74.
