= Thomas Bartley (cricket umpire) =

English cricketer and Test match umpire

Thomas John Bartley (19 March 1908 – 2 April 1964) was a Test match umpire.

Born in Northop Hall in Flintshire, Tom Bartley represented Cheshire in the Minor Counties Cricket Championship from 1933 to 1939 and played for Rawtenstall in the Lancashire League in 1946. He was one of the best fast bowlers in Liverpool league cricket, taking all 10 wickets once and nine wickets in an innings nine times.

He made his most notable contribution to cricket as an umpire. He stood in 321 matches of first-class cricket from 1948 to 1960, including six home Tests against Pakistan, South Africa and Australia from 1954 to 1956.
