= Emrys Davies =

Glamorgan cricketer and Test umpire

Emrys Davies

David Emrys Davies (27 June 1904 – 10 November 1975) was a Glamorgan cricketer and in his later years a Test cricket umpire.

Davies was born in Llanelli, Carmarthenshire, Wales. His first class career for Glamorgan lasted for thirty one years, from 1924 till 1954. He was a left-handed top order batsman and a slow left-arm orthodox bowler. Two years after retirement he umpired his first Test match, going on to umpire nine in total. Davies died in Llanelli, Carmarthenshire, Wales.

He was selected by commentator John Arlott in the Best XI from players who, for a wide variety of reasons, were never capped by England.

== Records ==
At the end of his 621-game career he had scored 26564 runs and 903 wickets as he put himself into the record books at Glamorgan.

- Twice took 100 wickets in a season, 1935 and 1937
- His 885 wickets for Glamorgan puts him 7th on their all-time list as of 2007
- Holds the Glamorgan 3rd wicket record stand with Willie Jones of 313
- His tally of 26102 runs has been bettered only by Alan Jones
- In 1937 he scored 1954 runs which is the club's 7th highest total for a season
- He is one of only six cricketers from his county to have scored more than 30 centuries (31)
- His highest score of 287* was a club record until broken by Steve James in 2000, some 61 years later
- With 612 games to his name for Glamorgan, he is second only to Don Shepherd for the most capped player for the county
