= George Thoms =

Australian cricketer

Personal information
- Full name: George Ronald Thoms
- Born: 22 March 1927; Footscray, Victoria
- Died: 29 August 2003 (aged 76); Melbourne, Victoria
- Batting: Right-handed

International information
- National side: Australia
- Only Test (cap 192): 25 January 1952 v West Indies

Domestic team information
- Years: Team
- 1946/47-1953/54: Victoria

Career statistics
Competition	Test	First-class
Matches	1	19
Runs scored	44	1,137
Batting average	22.00	35.53
100s/50s	0/0	3/5
Top score	28	150
Balls bowled	–	32
Wickets	–	1
Bowling average	–	14.00
5 wickets in innings	–	0
10 wickets in match	–	0
Best bowling	–	1/8
Catches/stumpings	0/–	10/–
- Source: ESPNcricinfo, 19 November 2022

George Ronald Thoms OAM (22 March 1927 – 29 August 2003) was an Australian cricketer who played in one Test match in 1952. He played 18 first-class matches for Victoria, one in 1946, and then more regularly from 1951–52 to 1953–54.

Born in Footscray, Victoria, Thoms attended Melbourne University, where he opened the batting for Melbourne University Cricket Club with Colin McDonald. He also played first-class cricket for Victoria alongside McDonald, and they both made their Test debut in the fifth Test against West Indies at the Sydney Cricket Ground in January 1952, alongside fellow debutant Richie Benaud. Uniquely, Thoms and McDonald opened the batting together for a Test team, state team, and club team in that season. A solid, rather than spectacular, batsman, he scored 16 and 28. Thoms was dismissed hit wicket in the second innings, treading on the stumps after pulling a Frank Worrell delivery for four.

Johnnie Moyes, a pre-eminent cricket historian, wrote hyperbolically of this modest beginning: "He was a player of negative qualities, and one gained the impression that a competent leader could close him down to an occasional single for hours at a time, not the type of batsman for whom there could be any international future. It was no surprise that his first Test was also his last."

His top score was 150 for Victoria against Western Australia in Perth in the first match of the 1951–52 season. He also scored 120 later in the season, against Queensland in Melbourne, and finished the Sheffield Shield season with 521 runs at 57.88. He also made a century, 140, against Tasmania in Hobart in 1953–54. He played his last first-class match in 1953–54 at 26.

Thoms retired from representative cricket to concentrate on his medical career, fearful that a hand injury could end his ambitions as a surgeon. He is thought to be the only Test cricketer to have been a gynaecologist. He introduced laser surgery to Australia in the 1970s and was awarded the Order of Australia Medal in 1996. Jim Thoms, his elder brother, was a noted Australian rules footballer and national table tennis champion.

During 1950 and 1951 Thoms was a member of the VFL Umpires Association and field umpired 16 matches of Australian football in various country leagues across Victoria. He also officiated in a single VFL Second Eighteens (later VFL Reserve Grade) match in June 1951.

He attended a reunion of 150 Australian Test cricketers in Sydney on 11 July 2003. He died a few weeks later, in Melbourne, Victoria.

== See also ==
- One-Test wonder
