= Keith Rigg =

Australian cricketer

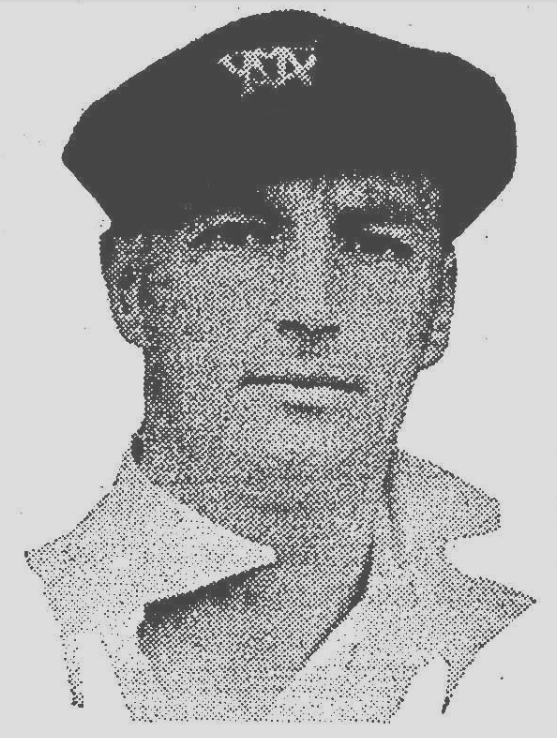
- Rigg pictured in 1937

Personal information
- Full name: Keith Edward Rigg
- Born: 21 May 1906; Malvern, Melbourne, Australia
- Died: 28 February 1995 (aged 88); Malvern, Melbourne, Australia
- Batting: Right-handed
- Relatives: Colin McDonald (cousin); Ian McDonald (cousin)

International information
- National side: Australia
- Test debut (cap 136): 27 February 1931 v West Indies
- Last Test: 26 February 1937 v England

Domestic team information
- Years: Team
- 1926/27–1938/39: Victoria

Career statistics
Competition	Test	First-class
Matches	8	87
Runs scored	401	5544
Batting average	33.41	42.00
100s/50s	1/1	14/30
Top score	127	167*
Catches/stumpings	5/–	58/–
- Source: CricketArchive, 1 September 2008

Keith Edward Rigg MBE (21 May 1906 – 28 February 1995) was an Australian cricketer who played in eight Test matches from 1931 to 1937. His cousin, Colin McDonald, also played for Victoria and Australia. He was educated at Wesley College, Melbourne.

In addition to cricket, Rigg played Australian rules football in the Metropolitan Amateur Football Association (MAFA) for the Collegians football Club. He was named the best and fairest player in A Section for the 1927 season.

From 1933 to 1937, Rigg had an endorsement deal with the Alexander Patent Racket Company in Launceston, Tasmania, to produce a range of 'Keith Rigg' cricket bats.

He was appointed Member of the Order of the British Empire (MBE) in the 1971 Birthday Honours for services to industry and sport.
