= Dingbats (board game) =

Puzzle board game

Dingbats is the name of a puzzle franchise devised by Paul Sellers in 1980 and first published as a board game in 1987.

== Gameplay ==
The game, for two or more people, involves solving rebuses: puzzles in which a common word or saying is hidden in a cryptic or otherwise unique arrangement of symbols.

== Publication history ==
The puzzles are syndicated internationally in newspapers, under various names such as "WHATZIT?" in North America and "KATCH-ITS" in Australia.

The name "Dingbats" is a registered trademark in the UK and European Union.

== Reception ==
In the February 1988 issue of The Games Machine (Issue 3), the reviewer said that "We didn't really think a awful lot of the game, it has a tendency to get annoying because of inconsistency in the difficulty of the puzzles - but good marks for effort and decent packaging."

== Reviews ==
- Jeux & Stratégie #48
