= Sven Thoms =

German biochemist

Sven Thoms (born 1970 in Geldern) is a German biochemist.

Thoms's research areas are peroxisomes, translational readthrough, dysferlin, and rare diseases caused by defective cell organelles. Thoms and colleagues discovered a new isoform of lactate dehydrogenase that arises from translational readthrough.
