= Colin McDonald (Australian cricketer) =

Australian cricketer (1928–2021)

Personal information
- Full name: Colin Campbell McDonald
- Born: 17 November 1928; Glen Iris, Victoria, Australia
- Died: 8 January 2021 (aged 92); Melbourne, Victoria
- Batting: Right-handed
- Role: Opening batsman
- Relatives: Ian McDonald (brother); Keith Rigg (cousin)

International information
- National side: Australia
- Test debut (cap 191): 25 January 1952 v West Indies
- Last Test: 6 July 1961 v England

Domestic team information
- Years: Team
- 1947/48–1962/63: Victoria

Career statistics
Competition	Test	First-class
Matches	47	192
Runs scored	3,107	11,375
Batting average	39.32	40.48
100s/50s	5/17	24/57
Top score	170	229
Balls bowled	8	301
Wickets	0	3
Bowling average	–	64.00
5 wickets in innings	–	0
10 wickets in match	–	0
Best bowling	–	1/10
Catches/stumpings	14/0	55/2
- Source: CricketArchive, 1 September 2008

Colin Campbell McDonald AM (17 November 1928 – 8 January 2021) was an Australian cricketer. He played in 47 Test matches from 1952 to 1961, and 192 first-class matches between 1947 and 1963. He was born in Glen Iris, Victoria.

== Biography ==
An opening batsman, he made his Test debut in the 5th Test against West Indies at Sydney in January 1952, alongside fellow debutants George Thoms, also an opening batsman, and Richie Benaud. Uniquely, Thoms and McDonald also opened the batting for the same state team, Victoria, and the same club team, Melbourne University that season. Thoms retired from cricket to concentrate on his medical career as a gynaecologist, and McDonald formed a successful opening partnership with Jim Burke. McDonald played in two stints for the Melbourne Cricket Club.

McDonald was the top scorer (32 and 89) in both innings of the 1956 Test, Laker's Match at Old Trafford, in which Jim Laker took 19 wickets. His career reached its zenith in the Ashes series against England in 1958/9. This was illustrated by him scoring the most runs of any player in Test cricket in the calendar year of 1959. He reached his highest Test score, 170, in the 4th Test against England at Adelaide, although he was retired hurt for much of the second day, and a second century in the 5th Test on his home ground in Melbourne. He was also captain of Victoria in 1958/9 and 1960/1. He retired from Test cricket in 1961, during the tour to England, as a result of a wrist injury.

He attended Scotch College Melbourne and Melbourne University, and was a schoolteacher for a short period. After working as an insurance broker, he was executive director of Tennis Australia where he had a pivotal role in building the National Tennis Centre now known as Rod Laver Arena. He was an ABC cricket commentator in the 1960s and 1970s.

His elder brother, Ian McDonald played first-class cricket for Victoria, and his mother's cousin, Keith Rigg, played for Victoria and Australia. McDonald published his memoirs, CC, The Colin McDonald Story: Cricket, Tennis, Life in 2009 with a foreword by Richie Benaud. On 8 January 2021, McDonald died aged 92.
