= Jim Thoms =

Australian rules footballer

Personal information
- Full name: James Francis Thoms
- Born: 25 May 1918
- Died: 3 September 2005 (aged 87)
- Original team: Combines
- Height: 173 cm (5 ft 8 in)
- Weight: 82 kg (181 lb)
- Position: Rover

Playing career^{1}
Years	Club	Games (Goals)
1937–1946	Footscray	120 (101)
1956–1957	Sorrento	9 (unknown)
- ^{1} Playing statistics correct to the end of 1946.

James Francis Thoms (25 May 1918 – 3 September 2005) was an Australian rules footballer who played for Footscray in the Victorian Football League (VFL).

Thoms, a speedy rover, was good enough to represent the VFL in both 1941 and 1946. Pushed forward in 1946, his final season, Thoms kicked 50 goals and at least one in each of his 19 games for the year. This tally included bags of six against both Geelong and Hawthorn, at Western Oval. His last league appearance was in a Semi Final loss to Melbourne where he brought up the 100th goal of his career.

South Australian club West Torrens secured his services for the 1945 finals series. In the 1st semifinal against North Adelaide he kicked a goal on the bell to break the deadlock and put West Torrens into the Grand Final, which they won. The bell had actually sounded before he kicked the ball but because umpire Ken Aplin had not heard it and thus didn't signal the end of the game, the goal was allowed.

His younger brother, George, was an Australian Test cricketer and gynaecologist.
