= Burnley Cricket Club =

Burnley
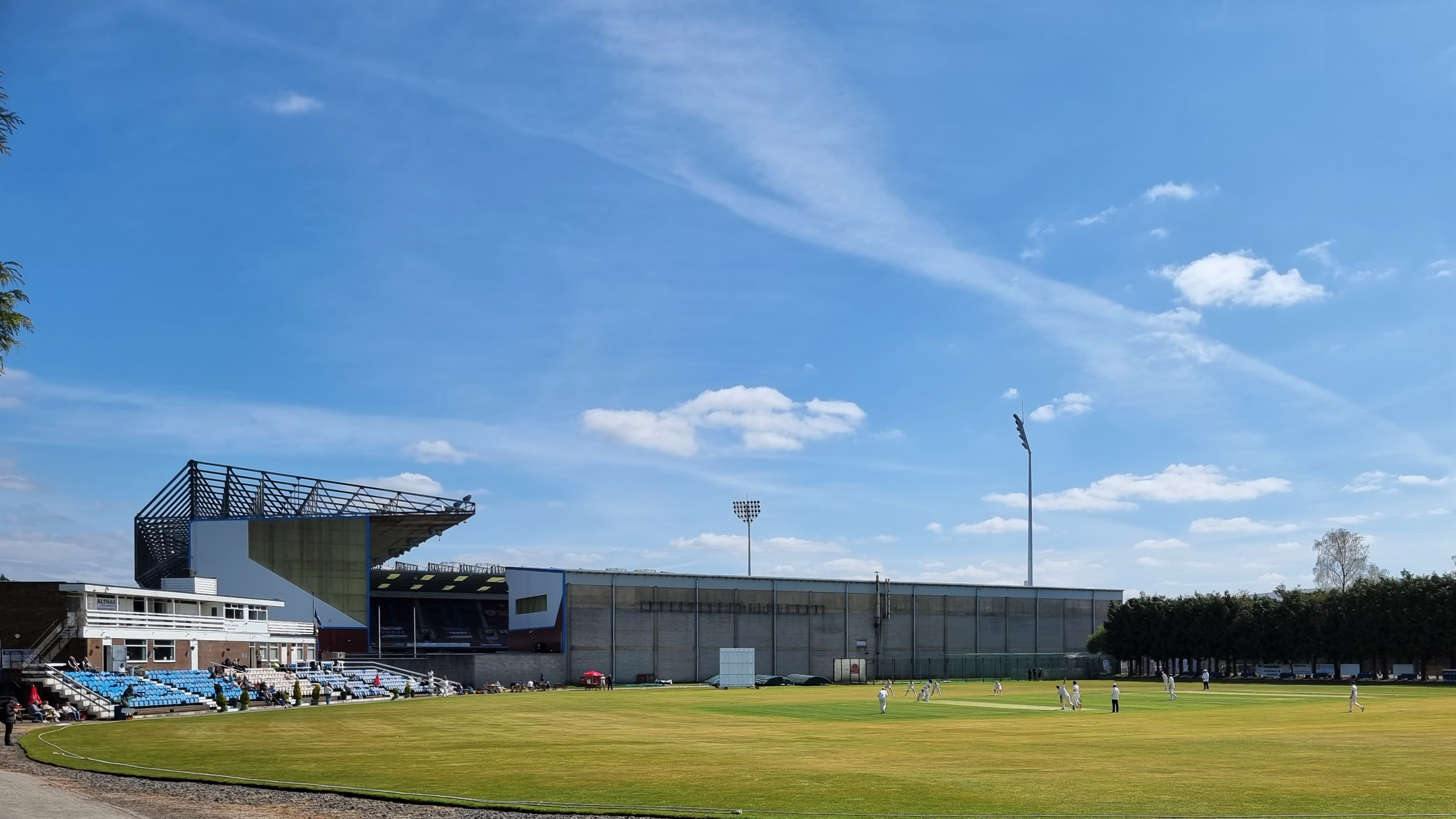
- Turf Moor cricket ground
- League: Lancashire League

Personnel
- Captain: Chris Burton

Team information
- Founded: 1833
- Home ground: Turf Moor

History
- Lancashire League wins: 20
- Worsley Cup wins: 10
- 20/20 Cup wins: 3
- Ron Singleton Colne Trophy wins: 4
- 2nd XI League wins: 11
- Lancashire Telegraph Cup wins: 3
- 3rd XI League wins: 3
- Official website: burnleycricketclub.com

Burnley Cricket Club is a cricket club in the Lancashire League based at Turf Moor in Burnley, Lancashire.

The club was a founder member of the Lancashire League in 1892 and has won the League Championship 20 times, the Worsley Cup 10 times and the 20/20 Cup 3 times.

The club has seen huge success in recent years, including becoming the first club to win the Worsley Cup four years in a row, from 2013 to 2016, as well as enjoying a record breaking season in 2015 in which it won all four senior trophies; the league, the Worsley Cup, the 20/20 Competition and the Ron Singleton Colne Trophy. In addition, Burnley also won the 2nd XI League and finished as runners-up in the Third XI League.

In 2019, 2021, 2023 and 2024, Burnley again finished the league season in first place. During the 2024 season, the captain was Chris Burton, and the club professional was Ockert Erasmus.

== History ==
During the Middle Ages Turf Moor was one of Burnley's commons and the inhabitants likely cut turf here for fuel.

Burnley Cricket Club has its origin in a side called the Trafalgar Club, known to have played a match in the Bull Croft (near the town hall) in 1828. Over the next few years they played matches at Stoneyholme and Healey Heights, before taking the name Burnley Cricket Club by 1833. A field near Red Lion Street then became their home until in 1843 they moved to Turf Moor. After two years here, the team played for another two near Duke Bar before making Turf Moor their permanent home. In 1857 the team was disestablished, and between 1859 and 1863 a team organised by the Burnley Militia, called the Burnley Wellington Club, played at the ground. In 1864 Burnley Cricket Club was re-formed and was soon making progress, fielding three teams.

Notable matches in the period before a league was organised include: A three-day visit from the All-England Eleven (then headed by George Parr) in 1868; matches against an Australian eleven, featuring Fred Spofforth and Billy Murdoch, in 1878 and 1880, of which Burnley won the first; and an 1890-match between two visiting ladies' teams which attracted thousands of spectators.

The cricket club sponsored the formation of Burnley Football Club, and in January 1883, they leased seven acres of land for the team, situated between the cricket field and Bee Hole Colliery to the east. They also made a donation of £65 (the equivalent of £7,000 as of 2025 (Note: UK Consumer Price Index inflation figures from 1209–2024 based on data from "Inflation calculator". Bank of England. London. 18 February 2026.)) toward the setup costs. In 1885, a dispute broke out as the cricketers complained that the footballers left the shared dressing room uncleaned and did not pay toward repairs. In 1889, after more disputes, Burnley F.C. separated from the cricket club and agreed to pay £77 per year (the equivalent of £9,000 as of 2025) to rent the stadium.

In the early years of the Lancashire League, Burnley were one of the dominant teams, champions six times by 1913, including three-in-a-row from 1906.

== Honours ==
The club has won the following honours:

- 1st XI League - 20 - 1893, 1897, 1901, 1906, 1907, 1908, 1913, 1950, 1956, 1964, 1970, 1978, 1979, 2006, 2015, 2019, 2021, 2023, 2024, 2026
- Worsley Cup - 10 - 1950, 1953, 1958, 1960, 1975, 1984, 2013, 2014, 2015, 2016
- 20/20 Cup - 3 - 2009, 2015, 2018
- Ron Singleton Colne Trophy - 4 - 2007, 2015, 2021, 2024 (shared)
- 2nd XI League - 11 - 1893, 1903, 1906, 1929, 1931, 1961, 1968, 2002, 2015, 2022, 2024
- 2nd XI (Lancashire Telegraph) Cup - 3 - 1984, 2004, 2023
- 3rd XI League - 3 - 1980, 2006, 2025

== Notable players ==
- James Anderson
- Sydney Barnes
- Arthur Bell (Note: Also played football for Burnley.)
- Richard Boys
- David Brown
- Fred Brown
- Michael Brown
- Jonathan Clare
- Billy Cook
- Henry Cudworth
- Jerry Dawson
- John Kettley
- Tommy Lawton
- Hal Pickthall
- Elisha Rawlinson
- Frank Sugg
- Walter Sugg
- Vishal Tripathi
- Thomas Wardall

== See also ==
- Lowerhouse Cricket Club - another Lancashire League team from Burnley
