= Burnley Law Courts =

Judicial building in Burnley, England

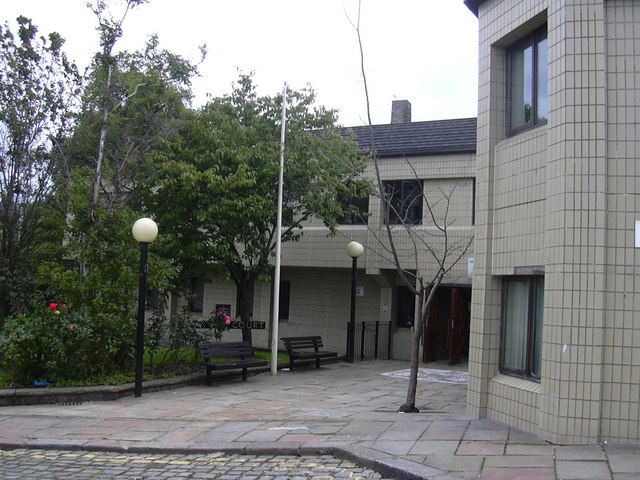
- Burnley Law Courts

- Shown in Lancashire
- 53.7878°N 2.2473°W
- Location: Hammerton Street, Burnley

History
- Built: 1981

Site notes
- Architect: Property Services Agency
- Architectural style: Modernist style

Burnley Law Courts is a Crown Court venue, which deals with criminal cases, and a County Court venue, which deals with civil cases, in Hammerton Street, Burnley, England.

== History ==
Until the early 1980s, criminal court hearings in Burnley were held in the courtroom in Burnley Town Hall. However, as the number of court cases in Burnley grew, it became necessary to commission a more substantial courthouse for criminal court hearings. The site selected by the Lord Chancellor's Department had accommodated a series of rows of terraced housing (Mount Pleasant Street, Howarth Street and Whittam Street). These streets had been part of the Weaver's Triangle area of Burnley and the buildings, which were in a poor state, were demolished in the 1930s.

The new building was designed by the Property Services Agency in the Modernist style, built in buff brick at a cost of £1.5 million, and was opened in 1981. The design involved an asymmetric main frontage in two sections facing onto Whittam Street. The left-hand section of four bays was well set back from the road: the right-hand bay, which was slightly projected forward, featured a four-door opening, surmounted by a Royal coat of arms, with a small casement window on the first floor. On the ground floor, the other bays in that section were fenestrated by casement windows and were separated by buttresses which supported the first floor structure: the first floor structure was cantilevered out over the pavement, fenestrated with casement windows and clad in dark brown panels. The right-hand section was irregularly fenestrated with casement windows and featured a canted recess, containing a single first-floor window, in the right-hand bay. Internally, the building was laid out to accommodate five courtrooms.

In 2008, a member of a jury in a sex abuse case was dismissed, after she used a poll on her Facebook page to help her to decide whether the defendant in the case was guilty or not guilty.

Notable cases have included the trial and acquittal of the actor, Peter Adamson, in July 1983, on charges of indecent assault, and the trial and conviction of another actor, Jody Latham, in December 2012, for growing cannabis in his garden: Latham was given a suspended prison sentence.
