= William Cook (Lancashire cricketer) =

English footballer and cricketer

Billy Cook
Personal information
- Full name: William Cook
- Date of birth: 16 January 1882
- Place of birth: Preston, England
- Date of death: 18 December 1947 (aged 65)
- Place of death: Burnley, England
- Position: Left back

Senior career*
Years	Team	Apps	(Gls)
1902	Preston North End	0	(0)
1903	Ashton Town		
1904–1908	Rossendale United	96	(15)
1908–1920	Oldham Athletic	157	(16)
1920	Rossendale United	16	(0)
- Cricket career
Cricket information
- Batting: Right-handed
- Bowling: Right-arm-fast-medium
Career statistics
Competition	First-class
Matches	11
Runs scored	307
Batting average	21.92
100s/50s	0/0
Top score	46
Balls bowled	1764
Wickets	51
Bowling average	18.54
5 wickets in innings	3
10 wickets in match	1
Best bowling	7/64
Catches/stumpings	4/–
- Source: Cricinfo, 21 April 2023
- * Club domestic league appearances and goals

William Cook, born William Whalley, known as Billy Cook (16 January 1882 – 18 December 1947), was an English footballer and cricketer.

== Football career ==
After impressing in junior football, Billy was signed as a professional by Preston North End in February 1902. He was released at the end of the 1901–02 season without having made a first team appearance, and for the next six years played for teams in the Lancashire Combination. In February 1908 he was transferred from Rossendale United to Oldham Athletic for £200, and in the following years he established himself as a hard tackling full back, with Oldham rising to challenge for honours in the First Division. He played in the seasons up to the First World War, and was able to retain his place when domestic football resumed in the 1919–20 season. In November 1919 he was chosen to play for the Football League against the Irish League, but in this game he was unlucky to receive an injury. After several weeks out he was able to return to play for Oldham, but the 1919–20 season proved to be his last in senior football. He retired having played 171 league and cup games for Oldham scoring 16 goals (13 being penalties).

A lively character his football career was not without controversy. In April 1915 he was sent off in a game at Middlesbrough. Convinced that he was innocent he refused to leave the pitch, with the referee having no option but to abandon the game with over 30 minutes still remaining. The Football Association came down heavily on him, and he was subsequently suspended from playing any football for the next twelve months.

== Cricket career ==
Billy had a lengthy cricket career, playing at a high standard of competitive cricket for over 30 years. He first came to notice with Penwortham Cricket Club, and while still in his teens he was engaged as a professional by Rossall College. In the early 1900s he gained a fine reputation as a fast bowler playing for Preston Cricket Club, and in 1904 he became a professional with Lancashire League team Enfield. He was then taken on by Lancashire County Cricket Club, and in July 1905 on his first class debut for Lancashire against Gloucestershire he took 11 wickets for 118 runs. Despite this impressive start, he failed to establish a regular place and made the decision to concentrate on playing as a professional in the Lancashire League. He was highly successful as the professional with Burnley from 1906 to 1915, with them being Lancashire League champions on four occasions. He later had spells as a professional with Lowerhouse, Burnley (again), Royton, Enfield (again), and Colne. After finishing as a professional he played as an amateur for Read Cricket Club and then for Burnley (a third spell). All told he played in over 500 Lancashire League games and as a bowler claimed almost 2000 wickets. He later did some coaching back at Preston Cricket Club, and in 1940 he became the groundsman at Burnley.

== Personal life ==
Born William Whalley, he was listed under this name in both the 1891 United Kingdom Census and the 1901 United Kingdom Census returns. However throughout his professional career as a footballer and cricketer he was always referred to as having the surname Cook.

His father was the Preston Cricket Club groundsman for over 20 years, and Billy was one of four brothers to play cricket professionally, the most famous of his brothers being Lol Cook, who was also a cricketer footballer and who had a lengthy career with Lancashire County Cricket Club.
