= Pickthall (surname) =

Pickthall is a surname. Notable people with the surname include:

- Colin Pickthall (1944–2025), British politician
- Hal Pickthall (1896–1965), English cricketer
- Marjorie Pickthall (1883–1922), Canadian writer
- Marmaduke Pickthall (1875–1936), English Islamic scholar, author of The Meaning of the Glorious Quran, a translation of the Quran
