= Lawrence Cook (cricketer) =

English cricketer and footballer

Personal information
- Full name: Lawrence Whalley Cook
- Born: 28 March 1884; Preston, England
- Died: 2 December 1933 (aged 49); Wigan, England
- Nickname: Lol
- Batting: Right-handed
- Bowling: Right-arm medium

Domestic team information
- Years: Team
- 1907–1923: Lancashire

Career statistics
Competition	First-class
Matches	206
Runs scored	2,126
Batting average	12.50
100s/50s	0/1
Top score	54 not out
Balls bowled	44,399
Wickets	839
Bowling average	21.20
5 wickets in innings	46
10 wickets in match	8
Best bowling	8-39
Catches/stumpings	139/0
- Source: CricInfo

Lawrence Cook (born Lawrence Whalley; 28 March 1884 – 2 December 1933) was an English cricketer and footballer.

== Cricket career ==
Following in the footsteps of brother Billy Cook, Lawrence first came to notice playing for Penwortham Cricket Club. In one game in 1902 he had bowling figures of 9 wickets for 9 runs, yet it was a game Penwortham failed to win. He subsequently had spells as a professional with Lytham Cricket Club, Liverpool Cricket Club, and then Preston Cricket Club.

In 1907 he played his first games for the Lancashire County Cricket Club. His career at county level was somewhat unusual. For most of the time he was not a regular member of the senior eleven as many bowlers competed for two or three places, but near its end in his mid-thirties Cook bowled so well that some expected him to be chosen for the difficult 1920/1921 Ashes tour. He was not chosen, and indeed never played for England even during the disastrous 1921 series when thirty players were used to find a winning combination. Nonetheless, shrewd judges are unanimous that Cook was not the bowler for Test matches against a formidable batting side on rock-hard pitches.

Lawrence emerged as a bowler of fast-medium pace, possibly meant to substitute for Walter Brearley who was then engaged in one of his many disputes with the Lancashire committee. Although he took a wicket with his first ball in first-class cricket, on the whole his record for that season was moderate, but with seven wickets on a rare hard pitch against Kent at Canterbury he showed he had great persistence. When Brearley came back into the eleven in 1908, Cook was relegated to the Second Eleven, but in 1910 he re-established in place and in the May following year, helped by a bad pitch and feeble Northamptonshire batting, he bowled with considerable pace and a lot of spin to take eight wickets for 39 runs. Cook indeed bowled so well early that season that Lancashire seemed to have found an excellent pace bowler when Brearley could not play. However, he was felt impossible to fit in when that fast bowler was free from business and on returning to the side he did not maintain his early season form, nor did he do anything of note against the top counties.

The years 1912 to 1914 saw Lancashire, even with Brearley gone, aim to stabilise their bowling lineup. This left no room for Cook - he was probably passed over in favour of men who could bat better. During World War I, Lawrence Cook served in the Army, and he was not demobilised until well after the 1919 season commenced.

When he returned, however, Cook - now bowling at a slower pace than in 1911 - immediately became, for the first time, indispensable to Lancashire. Although he still failed to achieve much against strong counties, he did a notable performance against Gloucestershire with nine for 49, and was second in the Lancashire bowling averages. 1920, however, saw Cook jump right to the top of the tree with 156 first-class wickets for less than fifteen runs each, and some notable performances in tandem with Harry Dean and Cecil Parkin, notably against Kent at Old Trafford in July. Although he did not have the honour of representing the Players or touring Australia, Cook would no doubt have been chosen as a Cricketer of the Year by Wisden but for the special portrait of Pelham Warner to commemorate Middlesex's Championship win. In the dry summer of 1921, Cook showed himself to be one of the most tireless and consistent workhorses in county cricket, even if no selector thought he had enough sting to be a Test match bowler. He took 151 wickets without one haul of seven in an innings, and in 1922 he maintained his accuracy and spin notably when taking seven for 23 on a crumbling pitch.

Lancashire awarded him a benefit in 1923, but although he was still a most effective stock bowler Cook that season appeared to have lost much of his spin and was dropped for a number of matches late in the season. He still took almost 100 wickets even if at quite a high cost, but with Ted McDonald qualified it was not seen as worthwhile to retain him for 1924.

With his cricket career winding down, he spent most of the 1924 cricket season as the professional with Lancashire League team Rawtenstall.

Lawrence Cook
Personal information
- Positions: Outside right; centre forward

Senior career*
Years	Team	Apps	(Gls)
1904–1905	Blackpool	7	(0)
1905	Nelson		
1905–1906	Preston North End	0	(0)
1906	Nelson		
1906–1907	Lancaster		
1907–1908	Southport Central		
1908	Gainsborough Trinity	9	(3)
1908–1910	Rossendale United	63	(62)
1910–1911	Bacup		
1911–1912	Chester		
1912–1913	Stockport County	10	(4)
1913–1914	Chester		
- * Club domestic league appearances and goals

== Football career ==
Lol also had a lengthy career as a footballer, having three separate spells playing for clubs in the Football League. In the 1904–05 season he had a short run as an outside right in the Blackpool first team. He next joined Lancashire Combination team Nelson, before a short spell at Preston North End. He made no first team appearances at Preston, and soon returned to Nelson. This was followed by spells at Lancaster and Southport Central. Now playing as a centre forward, in the 1908–09 season he had another short first team run playing for Gainsborough Trinity. He next played for Bacup, and this was followed by a season at Chester, when he was an extremely prolific goalscorer averaging over a goal per game. He attracted the interest of Stockport County, and in 1912–13 experienced his third run of first team football at Football League level. His best performance was to score a hat trick in a 3–1 win over Huddersfield Town on 5 October 1912. Once again his time playing at Football League level was relatively brief, and in the 1913–14 season he was back playing in the Lancashire Combination with Chester.

== Personal life ==
Born Lawrence Whalley, he was listed under this name in both the 1891 United Kingdom Census and the 1901 United Kingdom Census returns. However throughout his professional career as a cricketer and a footballer he was always referred to as having the surname Cook.

His father was the Preston Cricket Club groundsman for over 20 years, and Lol was one of four brothers to play cricket professionally. His elder brother Billy Cook was also a successful cricketer and footballer, and he also played some games for Lancashire County Cricket Club
