= Panopticons =

Series of sculptures in East Lancashire, England

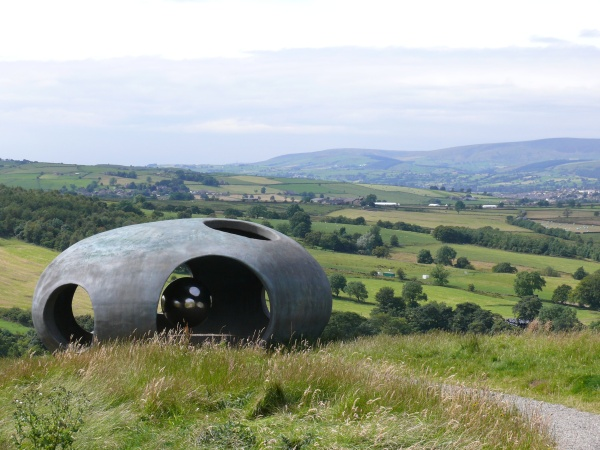
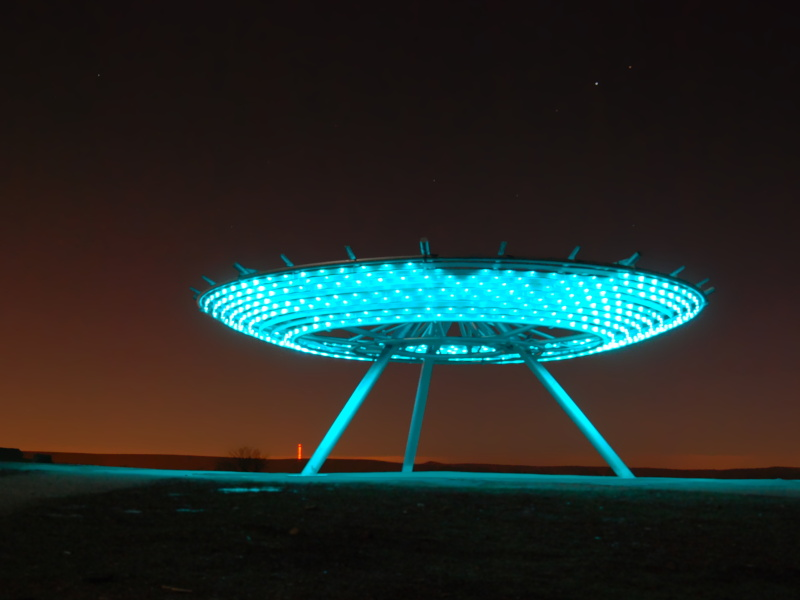
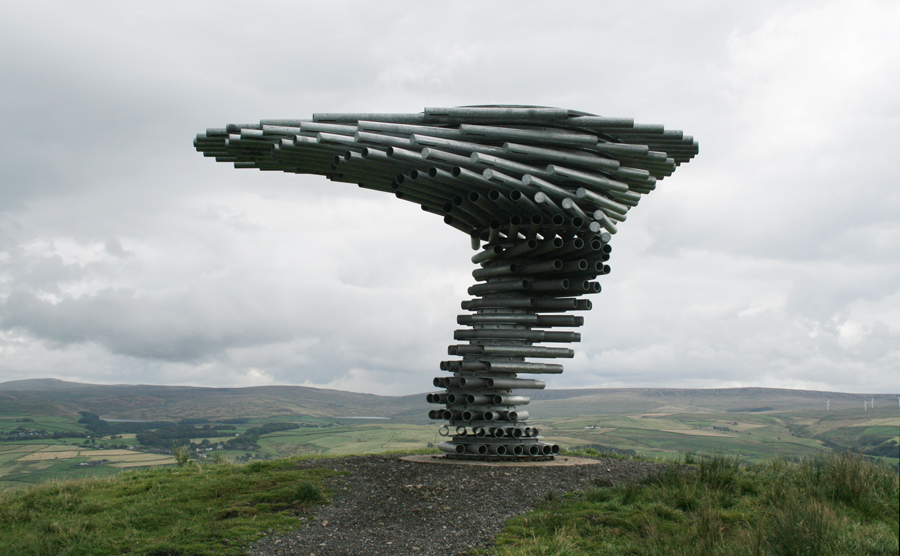
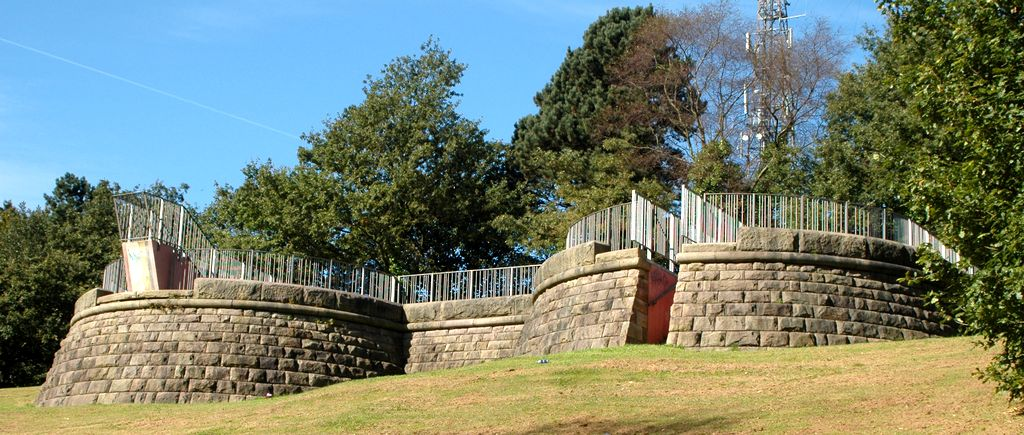
- Panopticons in Blackburn, the Borough of Burnley, the Borough of Pendle and the Borough of Rossendale
- Artist: Various
- Subject: Panopticon
- Location: Lancashire
- Website: midpenninearts.org.uk/programmes/panopticons

Panopticons is a series of four sculptures in Blackburn, Burnley, Pendle and Rossendale in Lancashire, England. They are part of an arts and regeneration project of the East Lancashire Environmental Arts Network managed by Mid Pennine Arts. The large scale outdoor sculptures were commissioned, designed and constructed over a six-year period.

The Halo in Haslingden, Rossendale was the last sculpture in the series to be erected, in September 2007. Plans for a similar sculpture in Accrington were never realised. One artist's impression showed a different design. Perhaps of a bird.

== Panopticon sculptures ==
There are four sculptures in the Panopticons series:

=== The Atom in Pendle ===
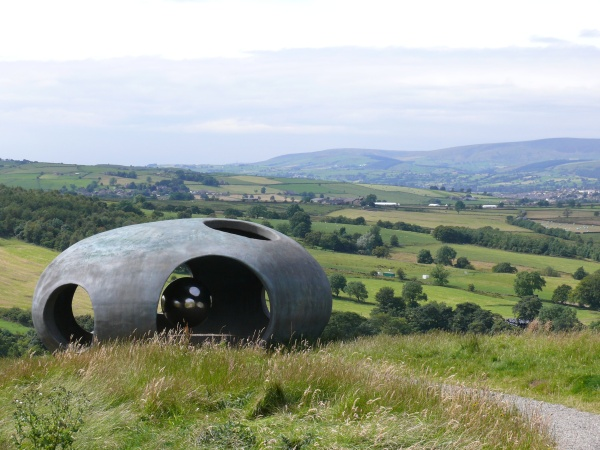
The Atom Wycoller, Borough of Pendle

Set near Wycoller in the landscape of Pendle, the Atom was designed by Peter Meacock, Andrew Edmunds and Katarina Novomestska of Peter Meacock Projects. It was launched by Mayor of Pendle, Councillor George Adams, with Anthony Wilson and designer Peter Meacock, on 22 September 2006. The bronze coated glass fibre reinforced concrete structure provides both a work of art and a viewing point and shelter from which to enjoy the surrounding landscape.

Part of this sculpture, the metal ball inside, has since been vandalised and removed. Atom is located at 53.8496°N 2.0968°W.

=== Colourfields, Blackburn ===
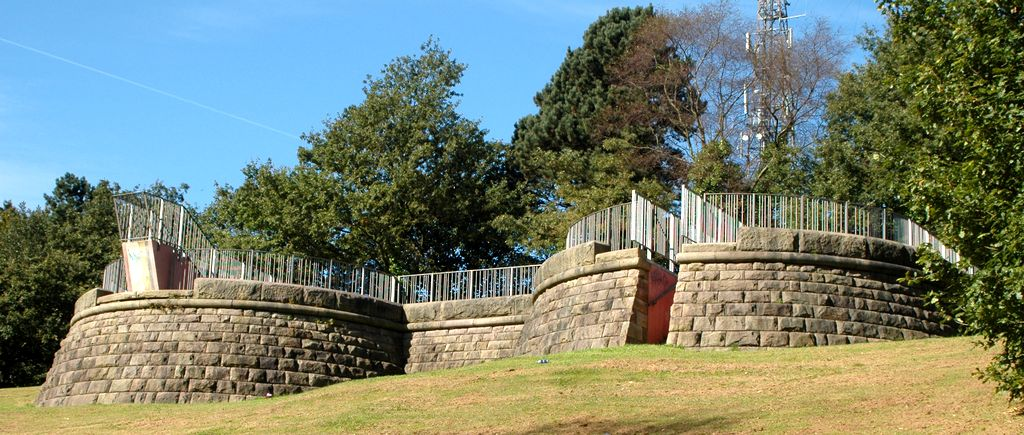
Colourfields in Blackburn

Colourfields in Blackburn is a collaboration between Jo Rippon Architecture and artist Sophie Smallhorn. The design uses the former cannon battery in Corporation Park as its base. Colourfields was launched by the Mayor of Blackburn with Darwen, Councillor Dorothy Walsh, on the 14 June 2006. It's situated at 53.7575°N 2.4976°W.

=== Haslingden Halo, Rossendale ===
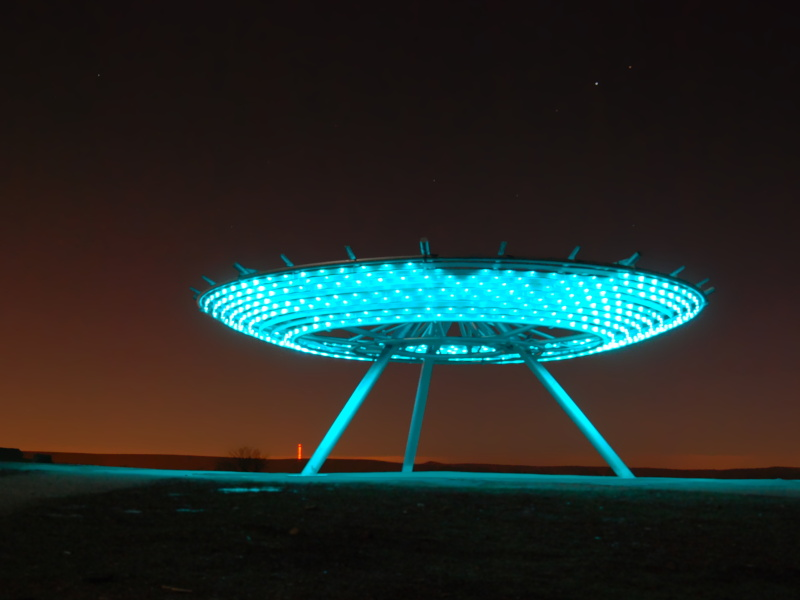
The Haslingden Halo, Borough of Rossendale

The Haslingden Halo is an artwork set on the expended landfill site (or "top 'o' slate") overlooking the town of Haslingden in Rossendale, positioned to be clearly visible from the M66 motorway and A56 road approach to Lancashire. It is located at grid reference SD791236. The Halo was the fourth and final Panopticon to be constructed in Lancashire, and was launched in September 2007.

The Halo is an 18m diameter steel lattice structure supported on a tripod five metres above the ground. The core is open at the top, framing views of the sky. It is lit after dark, using low energy LEDs powered by an adjacent wind turbine, and glows a sky blue colour, giving the effect of hovering above the town. It was designed by John Kennedy of LandLab. The Halo in Haslingden has been controversial due to associated maintenance costs and tree felling.

=== Singing Ringing Tree, Burnley ===
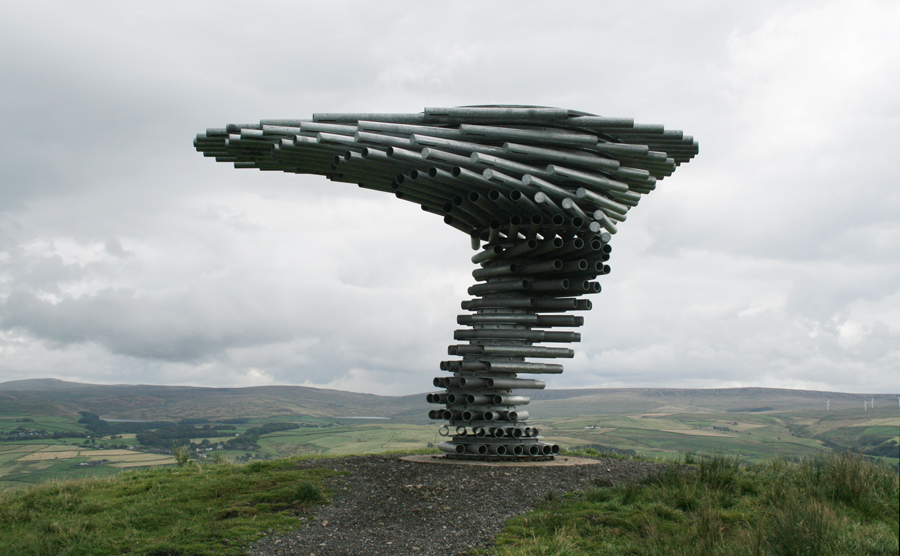
The Singing Ringing Tree, Burnley

The Singing Ringing Tree is a musical sculpture overlooking Burnley. It was designed by architects Mike Tonkin and Anna Liu of Tonkin Liu, and constructed from pipes of galvanised steel. Singing Ringing Tree was launched by the Mayor of Burnley, Councillor Mohammad Najib, JP, and designers Mike Tonkin and Anna Liu on 14 December 2006. The sculpture is located at 53°45′23.90″N 2°13′37.99″W.
