= Stoneyholme =

District of Burnley, England

Coordinates: 53.796°N 2.243°W

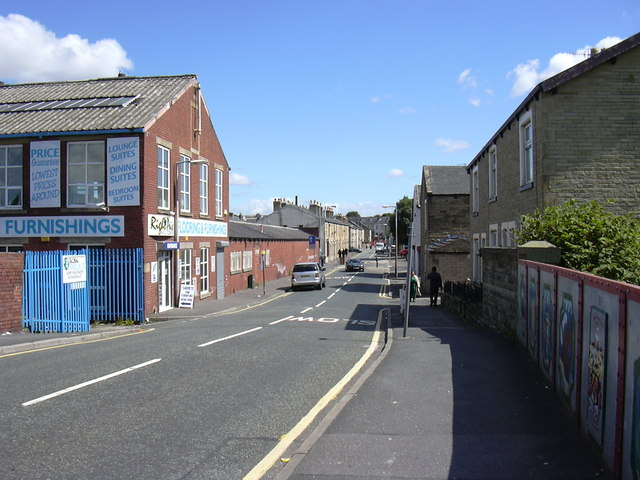
Daneshouse Road, looking east from the Leeds and Liverpool Canal bridge into neighbouring Daneshouse

Stoneyholme is a district of Burnley, Lancashire, England, situated immediately north of the town centre. It is bounded by the M65 motorway to the west, and by the railway and the Leeds and Liverpool Canal to the east, and consists of predominantly pre-1919 terraced housing.

Stoneyholme developed between 1860 and 1914 to house Burnley's expanding workforce. It had fewer industrial buildings than its near-neighbour Daneshouse, but these included the Ashley Street Dye Works (opened 1909; now converted to workshop units) and several gas holders, two of which survive.

It lies in the Daneshouse with Stoneyholme ward, which is 77.8% Asian or Asian British. The index of multiple deprivation places the ward among the 5% most deprived in the United Kingdom. 40.22% of children in the ward are eligible for free school meals. There were 339.8 crimes per 1,000 inhabitants in the year to December 2007 (Lancashire average 89.4), an increase of 3.1% on the previous twelve months.

In the 2000s, it suffered from housing market failure, and it became part of East Lancashire's Elevate scheme to clear, rebuild or remodel sub-standard housing.

== Calder Vale ==
Burnley Football Club, founded in May 1882, had its original home ground at Calder Vale, which is believed to have been situated in the Stoneyholme district. Historian Stephen Tate described the ground as "a frequently waterlogged riverside location in Stoneyholme". In early 1883, after being invited by Burnley Cricket Club, Burnley F.C. relocated to Turf Moor, which offered superior facilities and a more central location.

Burnley's first team played 11 recorded matches at Calder Vale, winning eight, including the first recorded game, a 4–0 victory against Burnley Wanderers on 10 August 1882.
