= Noel Leaver =

English painter

- Noel Harry Leaver painted by Leon Underwood in 1911
- Born: 23 March 1889; Austwick, West Riding of Yorkshire
- Died: 24 July 1951 (aged 62)
- Education: Burnley School of Art; Royal College of Art
- Known for: Painting

Noel Harry Leaver (23 March 1889 – 24 July 1951) was an English painter and teacher.

== Early life and training ==
Leaver was born at the School House in Austwick, West Riding of Yorkshire where his father Peter was a teacher. Soon after the family returned to Worsthorne near Burnley in Lancashire. He was educated at St. James School and the Burnley School of Art. He won a National Scholarship to the Royal College of Art at age 16, receiving his full associateship at 21. Towards the end of this time he was awarded a Travelling Scholarship which enabled him to travel to Italy for 6 months (May - October 1911) where he studied painting and architecture. This was followed early the following year with a second travelling scholarship this time awarded by RIBA (Royal Institute of British Architects), the Owen Jones Studentship, which took him back to Italy and from there to North Africa (February - August 1912).

== Work ==
Primarily a watercolourist, he was known for hot blue skies, often in contrast with shadowed buildings drawn from experience gained during his travels in Europe and North Africa. Leaver was also known for his paintings of English cathedrals.

He also taught at the Halifax School of Art (1912–15) and then the Burnley School of Art until the mid-1930s.

Sixty-one Noel Leaver watercolours were left to Towneley Hall by the late Dr Peter Bracewell.
