= Burnley Balloon Festival =

Burnley Balloon Festival was a balloon festival held in Towneley Park, Burnley. The festival was held annually from 2002, usually in late July. It was regarded as a major balloon event in the UK, as the largest in the North West. By 2005, average visitor numbers were around 20,000.

Alongside the display of hot air balloons, there was entertainment from motorbike stuntmen and various stage events. At night there is a fireworks display, accompanied by several balloons rising and atmospheric music.

In 2005, the event was cancelled due to lack of money. A businessman who ran the events fairground stepped in with £30,000 funding in order to save the event that year.

In 2009, no hot air balloons were able to leave the ground due to inclement weather. There is no record of the event having occurred since.
