= Richard Boys (cricketer) =

English cricketer

Richard Boys (17 June 1849 – 4 January 1896) was an English cricketer active in 1877 who played for Lancashire. He was born in Aberdour, Fife and died in Burnley. He appeared in one first-class match as a righthanded batsman, scoring 13 runs with a highest score of 10, and held two catches.

Boys operated a hatter's and hosier's shop. He and his wife were among three killed in a building collapse in 1896.
