= Hal Pickthall =

English cricketer

Personal information
- Full name: Harold Pickthall
- Born: 31 July 1896; Burnley, Lancashire, England
- Died: 8 August 1965 (aged 69); Fulwood, Lancashire, England
- Batting: Unknown
- Bowling: Unknown

Domestic team information
- Years: Team
- 1928–1935: Marylebone Cricket Club
- 1926–1929: Monmouthshire

Career statistics
Competition	First-class
Matches	12
Runs scored	109
Batting average	10.90
100s/50s	–/–
Top score	29*
Balls bowled	1,855
Wickets	25
Bowling average	30.88
5 wickets in innings	–
10 wickets in match	–
Best bowling	4/30
Catches/stumpings	3/–
- Source: Cricinfo, 25 October 2018

Harold 'Hal' Pickthall (31 July 1896 – 8 August 1965) was an English first-class cricketer.

Pickthall initially played club cricket in the Lancashire League prior to World War I with Burnley in 1913. He played for Burnley until 1920, after which he began playing for Lowerhouse. He played for Lowerhouse until 1923, and briefly returned to Burnley in 1925 for one match. Pickthall made his debut in minor counties cricket for the Welsh county Monmouthshire in the 1926 Minor Counties Championship against Surrey Second XI at The Oval. He played minor counties cricket for Monmouthshire from 1926–1929, making a total of 24 appearances in the Minor Counties Championship. He first appeared in first-class cricket for the Marylebone Cricket Club against Wales in 1928 at Lord's. He became a mainstay of the MCC side over the next few years, playing annually for them (with the exception of 1933) until 1935, making a total of twelve first-class appearances. Pickthall scored a total of 109 runs across these twelve matches, averaging 10.90, with a highest score of 29 not out. As a bowler, Pickthall took 25 wickets at a bowling average of 30.88, with best innings figures of 4 for 30.
