= Henry Cudworth =

English cricketer (1873–1914)

Henry Cudworth (6 December 1873 – 5 April 1914) was an English cricketer active in 1900 who played for Lancashire. He was born and died in Burnley. He appeared in one first-class match, scoring four runs.
