= Burnley High School =

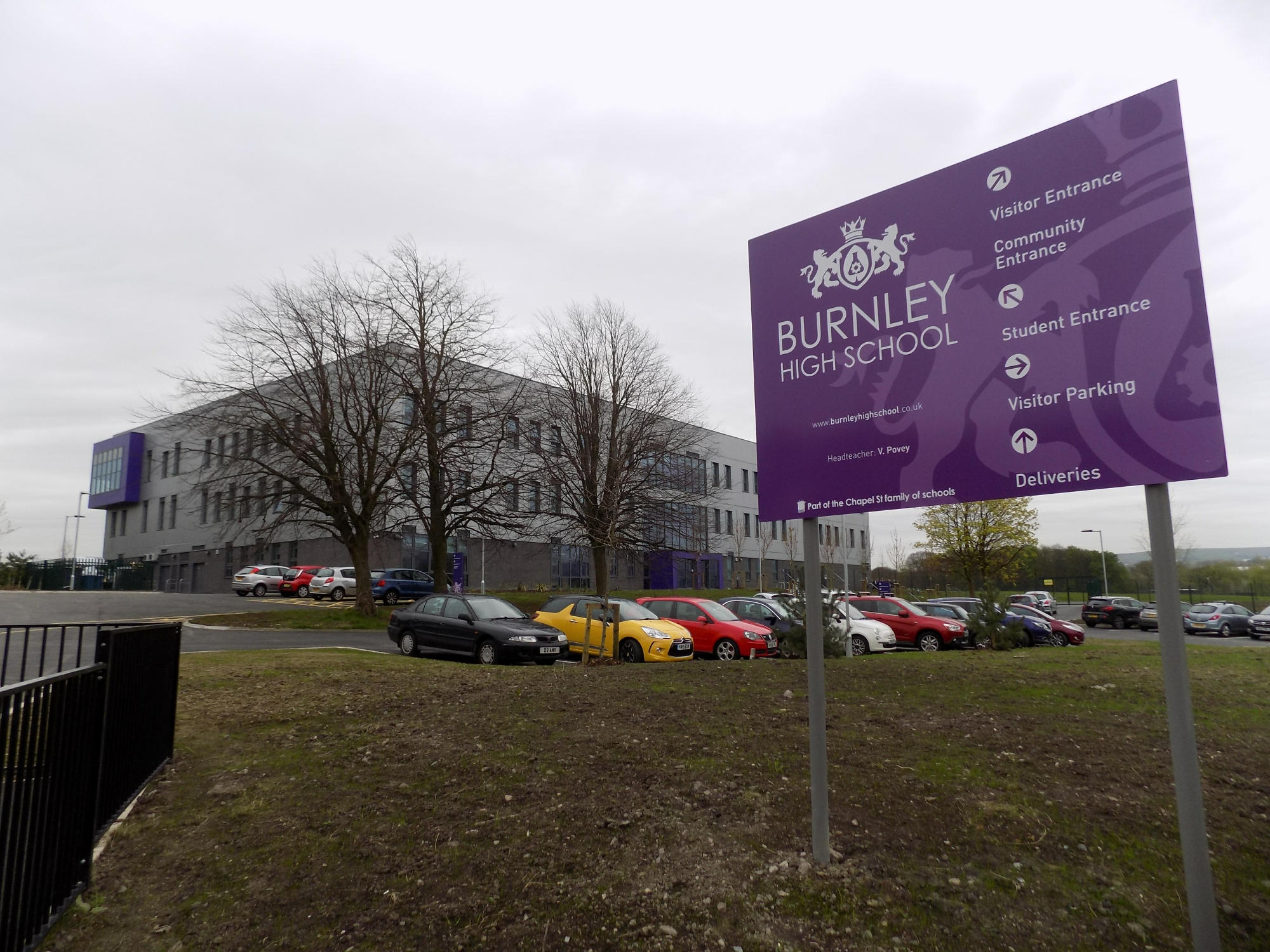

Location
- Byron Street; Burnley, Lancashire, BB12 6NX; 53.795°N 2.294°W

Information
- Type: Free school
- Established: 2014
- Trust: Education Partnership Trust
- Department for Education URN: 141028 Tables
- Ofsted: Reports
- Chair of Governors: Pete Baker
- Headteacher: Emma Lewis
- Gender: Mixed
- Age: 11 to 16
- Website: burnleyhigh.com

Burnley High School is a mixed secondary free school in the town and Borough of Burnley, Lancashire, England. The school opened in September 2014 with only 32 11-year-old pupils (Year 7) but quickly grew to over-subscription. The school has expanded and now has a capacity of 600 pupils. The school received its first set of GCSE results under headteacher Phill Walmsley in 2019.

Burnley Life Church has been a supporting partner since the school's launch. The school initially opened in the Parkhill Business Centre in Padiham Road, while a new building was constructed nearby on the site of the former Habergham High School (Burnley Grammar School). Its launch has been controversial as other schools in the town have hundreds of vacant places. The school moved the three existing year-groups into the new building in April 2017, with the school's first Ofsted inspection occurring shortly after and returning a "good" rating. The first year-group received its GCSE results in 2019.
