= Thomas Wardall =

English cricketer

Thomas Wardell
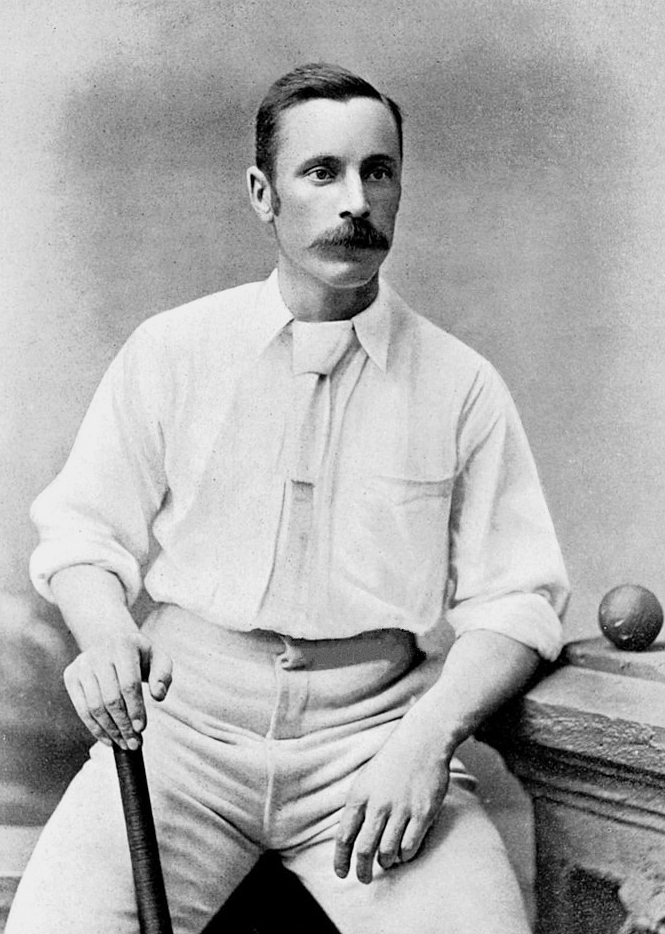
- Wardell in about 1895

Personal information
- Full name: Thomas Arthur Wardell
- Born: 19 April 1862; Eston, Yorkshire
- Died: 20 December 1932 (aged 70); Burnley, Lancashire
- Batting: Right-handed
- Bowling: Right-arm slow

Career statistics
Competition	First-class
Matches	47
Runs scored	1,163
Batting average	15.10
100s/50s	3/2
Top score	112
Balls bowled	2,396
Wickets	30
Bowling average	23.16
5 wickets in innings	1
10 wickets in match	0
Best bowling	23.16
Catches/stumpings	30/–
- Source: CricInfo, 25 March 2019

Thomas Arthur Wardall (19 April 1862 – 20 December 1932) was an English first-class cricketer, who played forty five matches for Yorkshire County Cricket Club from 1884 to 1894. He also played first-class games for the North of England in 1884, and L Hall's Yorkshire XI in 1891. He played in a total of 47 first-class matches, and also appeared for the Yorkshire Second XI in 1892.

Wardall was a right-handed batsman, who scored 1,163 runs at 15.10, with a best of 112 against Liverpool and District. He scored three centuries and held thirty catches in the field. Ward took thirty wickets with his right arm slow bowling, with a best analysis of 5 for 13 against Surrey, his only five wicket haul.
