= Burnley Town Hall =

Municipal building in Burnley, Lancashire, England

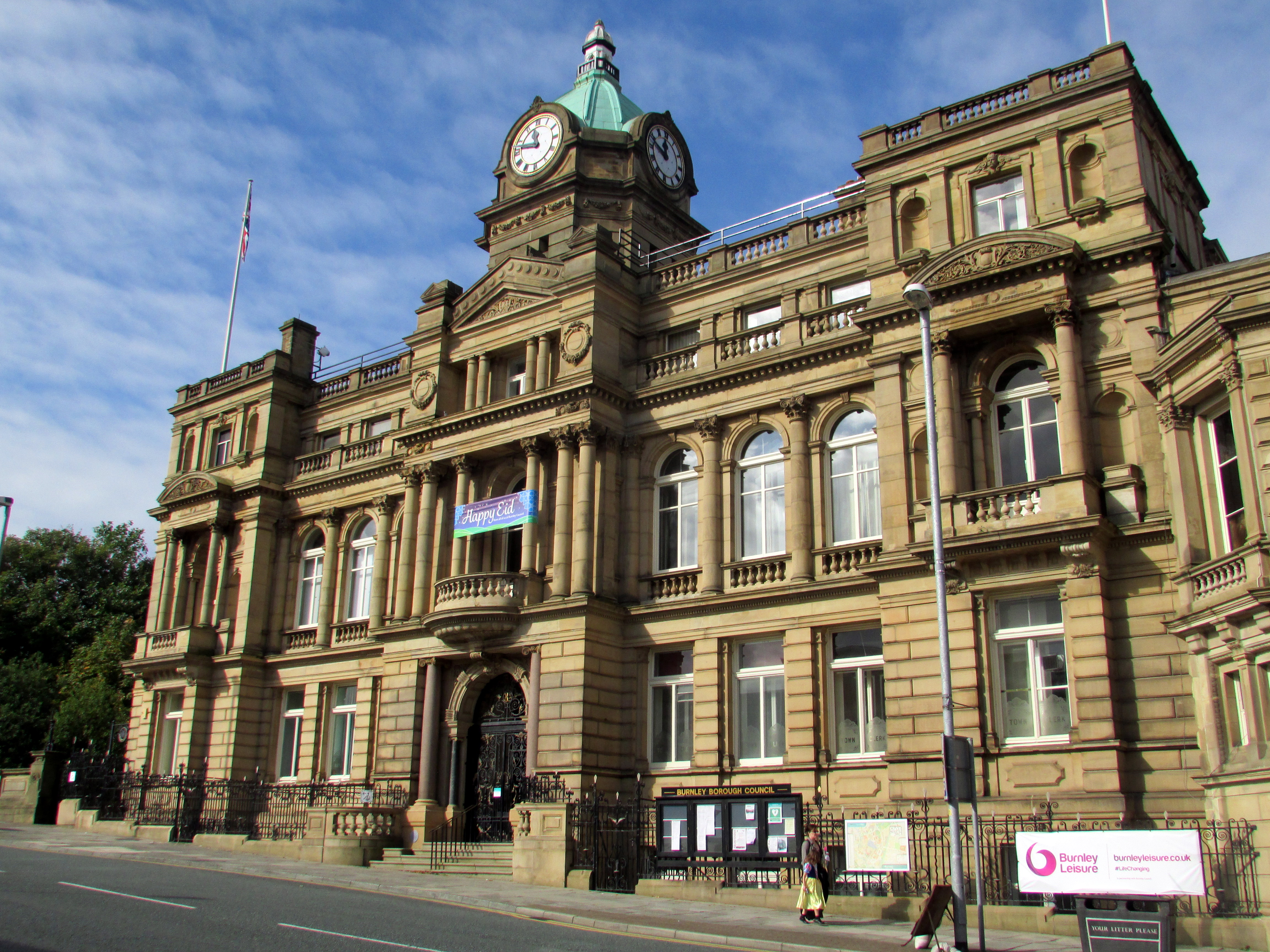
- Burnley Town Hall

- Shown in Lancashire Location in Burnley
- 53.7876°N 2.2448°W
- Location: Manchester Road, Burnley

History
- Built: 1888

Site notes
- Architect(s): Henry Holtom and George Arthur Fox
- Architectural style: Renaissance style

Listed Building – Grade II
- Designated: 29 September 1977
- Reference no.: 1244910

Burnley Town Hall is a municipal building in Manchester Road, Burnley, Lancashire, England. The town hall, which is the headquarters of Burnley Borough Council, is a Grade II listed building.

== History ==
In the mid 19th century local council meetings were held in the old fire station on Manchester Road until the council bought the public hall in Elizabeth Street in 1868. The council continued to seek sites to erect a new facility not least because the public hall in Elizabeth Street had not been the council's first choice of building. The site selected for the new building was a just to the southwest of the Mechanics' Institute which had been built in 1855.

The foundation stone for the new building was laid by John Baron, the mayor, in 1885. It was designed by Henry Holtom and George Arthur Fox from Dewsbury in the Renaissance style and was officially opened on 27 October 1888. The design of the centre section of the front elevation of the building involved Ionic columns of polished granite with sandstone capitals. The height to the top of the dome is 90 feet (27 m). When it opened, the building incorporated a new police station with 30 prison cells and a magistrates' court. The clock for the town hall was designed by Lord Grimthorpe in the same style as the mechanism for the clock of the Palace of Westminster and made by Potts of Leeds. The bells were by Gillett & Johnston: the large bell of the clock weighs 25 cwt and the four smaller bells weigh over 32 cwt. The interior decoration included a mosaic pavement with tiles made by Craven Dunnill bearing the town's coat of arms.

Queen Elizabeth II, accompanied by the Duke of Edinburgh, visited the town hall and waved to the crowd from the town hall balcony in February 1955.

The town hall became the headquarters of Burnley County Borough on completion and remained the local seat of government on the formation of the enlarged Borough of Burnley in 1974. The building was the venue for crown court trials until the new Law Courts in Hammerton Street opened in 1981. The Prince of Wales visited the town hall for a meeting with the civic dignitaries in February 2008.

In May 2016 Burnley F.C. were presented with the Football League Championship trophy outside the town hall after security risks at The Valley prevented the trophy from reaching south London on the final day of the competition. Essential repairs to the roof and external faces of the building were carried out in 2019.

== See also ==
- Listed buildings in Burnley
