= List of Marylebone Cricket Club players (1978–present) =

Cricketers who have debuted for Marylebone Cricket Club (MCC) in first-class, List A or Twenty20 matches from 1978 are as follows.

MCC have rarely taken part in List A matches (a total of seventeen between 1971 and 2020) or top-class Twenty20 matches (a total of five between 2018 and 2020). All the club's home matches have been played at its Lord's venue in London. The majority of MCC players in this period were contracted to county clubs and appeared for MCC by invitation. Some players were from other countries. The list includes players who took part in first-class matches for MCC on tour (e.g., to Bangladesh in 1999/2000). MCC teams have always operated at all levels of the sport and players who represented the club in minor cricket only are out of scope here.

The details are the player's usual name followed by the span of years in which he was active as an MCC player in important matches (the span may include years in which he played only in minor matches for MCC and/or years in which he did not represent MCC in any matches) and then his name is given as it appears on match scorecards (e.g., surname preceded by all initials), followed by the club or team with which he was mostly associated (this may be MCC itself). Players who have taken part in Test cricket have their names highlighted in bold text and the names of players who represented MCC in a List A or Twenty20 match are preceded by the † symbol.

== A ==
- Tom Abell (2019) : T. B. Abell (Somerset)
- **Andre Adams** (2014) : A. R. Adams (Nottinghamshire)
- James Adams (2013) : J. H. K. Adams (Hampshire)
- **Jimmy Adams** (2001) : J. C. Adams (Jamaica)
- **Jonathan Agnew** (1988–1989) : J. P. Agnew (Leicestershire)
- † Akbar Ansari (2008) : Akbar Ansari (Cambridge University)
- **Paul Allott** (1982–1985) : P. J. W. Allott (Lancashire)
- Tom Alsop (2017) : T. P. Alsop (Hampshire)
- **Aminul Islam** (2001) : Aminul Islam Bulbul (Dhaka Division)
- Hamish Anthony (1997) : H. A. G. Anthony (Leeward Islands)
- † Eugene Antoine (1992) : E. C. Antoine (Trinidad & Tobago)
- **† Keith Arthurton** (1996–1997) : K. L. T. Arthurton (Leeward Islands)
- Asif Din (1997) : Asif Din (Warwickshire)
- **Asif Mujtaba** (2000–2001) : Asif Mujtaba (Karachi Whites)
- **† Michael Atherton** (1987–1992) : M. A. Atherton (Lancashire)
- **Azhar Mahmood** (2001) : Azhar Mahmood (Rawalpindi)

== B ==
- Alan Badenhorst (1997) : A. Badenhorst (MCC)
- **Rob Bailey** (1985–1989) : R. J. Bailey (Northamptonshire)
- † Phil Bainbridge (1990) : P. Bainbridge (Gloucestershire, Durham)
- **Jake Ball** (2016) : J. T. Ball (Nottinghamshire)
- **Kim Barnett** (1989) : K. J. Barnett (Derbyshire)
- Ricky Bartlett (1988) : R. J. Bartlett (Somerset)
- † Hamish Barton (1996) : H. D. Barton (Auckland, Canterbury)
- **Gareth Batty** (2012) : G. J. Batty (Yorkshire, Surrey, Worcestershire)
- **Ian Bell** (2004–2016) : I. R. Bell (Warwickshire)
- Daniel Bell-Drummond (2014–2018) : D. J. Bell-Drummond (Kent)
- **† Kenny Benjamin** (1992) : K. C. G. Benjamin (Leeward Islands)
- Dale Benkenstein (2004–2013) : D. M. Benkenstein (Natal, Dolphins, Durham)
- **Mark Benson** (1990) : M. R. Benson (Kent)
- † Darren Berry (2000) : D. S. Berry (Victoria)
- **Dom Bess** (2018–2019) : D. M. Bess (Somerset, Yorkshire)
- Darren Bicknell (1991) : D. J. Bicknell (Surrey, Nottinghamshire)
- **Sam Billings** (2015) : S. W. Billings (Kent)
- **† Ian Bishop** (1996) : I. R. Bishop (Trinidad and Tobago, Derbyshire)
- **Ian Blackwell** (2012) : I. D. Blackwell (Derbyshire, Somerset, Durham)
- **† Richard Blakey** (1996) : R. J. Blakey (Yorkshire)
- Mark Boocock (1999/2000) : M. G. Boocock (Cheshire). Tours: Bangladesh (1999/2000).
- **† Ravi Bopara** (2006–2020) : R. S. Bopara (Essex). Tours: Pakistan (2019/2020).
- † Duncan Bradshaw (2008) : D. P. Bradshaw (MCC)
- Ruel Brathwaite (2007) : R. M. R. Brathwaite (Durham)
- **Tim Bresnan** (2006–2009) : T. T. Bresnan (Yorkshire)
- **Chris Broad** (1987) : B. C. Broad (Gloucestershire, Nottinghamshire)
- **Stuart Broad** (2019) : S. C. J. Broad (Leicestershire, Nottinghamshire)
- † Dougie Brown (2000) : D. R. Brown (Warwickshire)
- † Keith Brown (1990) : K. R. Brown (Middlesex)
- Barrington Browne (1996) : B. S. Browne (Guyana)
- Nick Browne (2016) : N. L. J. Browne (Essex)
- † Dylan Budge (2018) : D. E. Budge (Scotland)
- † Michael Burgess (2020) : M. G. K. Burgess (Leicestershire, Sussex, Warwickshire). Tours: Pakistan (2019/2020).
- Neil Burns (1989) : N. D. Burns (Leicestershire, Somerset)
- **Rory Burns** (2016) : R. J. Burns (Surrey)
- **Roland Butcher** (1987) : R. O. Butcher (Middlesex)
- Simon Butler (2007) : S. M. Butler (MCC)
- † David Byas (1996) : D. Byas (Yorkshire)

== C ==
- Dave Callaghan (2000) : D. J. Callaghan (Eastern Province)
- **David Capel** (1988) : D. J. Capel (Northamptonshire)
- **Michael Carberry** (2008–2015) : M. A. Carberry (Surrey, Kent, Hampshire)
- † John Carr (1987–1989) : J. D. Carr (Middlesex)
- **† Shivnarine Chanderpaul** (2017) : S. Chanderpaul (Guyana, Durham, Lancashire, Warwickshire, Derbyshire)
- **Aakash Chopra** (2007) : A. S. Chopra (Delhi)
- † Varun Chopra (2018) : V. Chopra (Essex, Warwickshire)
- Paul Christie (1989) : P. Christie (Durham)
- Joe Clarke (2017) : J. M. Clarke (Worcestershire)
- **Rikki Clarke** (2006–2016) : R. Clarke (Surrey, Derbyshire, Warwickshire)
- † Matt Coles (2018) : M. T. Coles (Kent, Hampshire, Essex)
- **Paul Collingwood** (2018) : P. D. Collingwood (Durham)
- **Nick Compton** (2007–2015) : N. R. D. Compton (Middlesex, Somerset)
- **Alastair Cook** (2004–2015) : A. N. Cook (Essex)
- **Geoff Cook** (1978–1982) : G. Cook (Northamptonshire, Durham)
- **Nick Cook** (1981–1988) : N. G. B. Cook (Leicestershire, Northamptonshire)
- Sam Cook (2019) : S. J. Cook (Essex)
- Dean Cosker (2010) : D. A. Cosker (Glamorgan)
- **Norman Cowans** (1984–1990) : N. G. Cowans (Middlesex, Hampshire)
- **† Chris Cowdrey** (1984–1989) : C. S. Cowdrey (Kent)
- Ben Cox (2017–2019) : O. B. Cox (Worcestershire)
- **Mason Crane** (2017) : M. S. Crane (Hampshire)
- **Robert Croft** (1996) : R. D. B. Croft (Glamorgan)
- **Tim Curtis** (1988) : T. S. Curtis (Worcestershire)

== D ==
- Steven Davies (2006–2011) : S. M. Davies (Worcestershire, Surrey, Somerset)
- Mark Davis (1999–2000) : M. J. G. Davis (Northern Transvaal, Northerns, Sussex)
- Joe Dawes (1999–2001) : J. H. Dawes (Queensland, Middlesex)
- **Richard Dawson** (2002) : R. K. J. Dawson (Yorkshire, Gloucestershire, Northamptonshire)
- **† Zander de Bruyn** (2000) : Z. de Bruyn (Gauteng, Somerset)
- Kevin Dean (2002) : K. J. Dean (Derbyshire)
- Steven Dean (2000) : S. J. Dean (Staffordshire)
- **Phillip DeFreitas** (1987) : P. A. J. DeFreitas (Derbyshire, Lancashire)
- **Joe Denly** (2013) : J. L. Denly (Kent)
- **Graham Dilley** (1980–1982) : G. R. Dilley (Kent)
- Paul Dixey (2007) : P. G. Dixey (Leicestershire, Kent)
- **† George Dockrell** (2017) : G. H. Dockrell (Somerset, Sussex, Leinster)
- **† Tony Dodemaide** (1996–2000) : A. I. C. Dodemaide (Victoria, Sussex)
- Brett D'Oliveira (2018) : B. L. D'Oliveira (Worcestershire)
- † Dan Douthwaite (2018) : D. A. Douthwaite (Glamorgan)
- **† Paul Downton** (1978–1989) : P. R. Downton (Kent, Middlesex)
- **Rahul Dravid** (2011) : R. S. Dravid (Karnataka)
- **Ben Duckett** (2017) : B. M. Duckett (Northamptonshire)
- Matt Dunn (2015) : M. P. Dunn (Surrey)
- † Keith Dutch (2000) : K. P. Dutch (Middlesex, Somerset)

== E ==
- † Ned Eckersley (2008–2013) : E. J. H. Eckersley (Leicestershire)
- **Fidel Edwards** (2018) : F. H. Edwards (Barbados, Hampshire)
- **† Richard Ellison** (1989) : R. M. Ellison (Kent)
- **John Emburey** (1978–1987) : J. E. Emburey (Middlesex)
- † Alasdair Evans (2018) : A. D. Evans (Derbyshire)
- Laurie Evans (2007) : L. J. Evans (Surrey, Sussex)

== F ==
- **† Neil Fairbrother** (1989–1991) : N. H. Fairbrother (Lancashire)
- † Fasal Shahid (2008) : Fasal Shahid (Herefordshire)
- **Matthew Fisher** (2018) : M. D. Fisher (Yorkshire)
- **† Andy Flower** (1996–2005) : A. Flower (Mashonaland, Essex)
- **Grant Flower** (1996–1997) : G. W. Flower (Mashonaland, Essex, Leicestershire)
- **Ben Foakes** (2016) : B. T. Foakes (Essex, Surrey)
- Geoff Foley (1996–1997) : G. I. Foley (Queensland)
- Ian Folley (1987) : I. Folley (Lancashire)
- Mark Footitt (2006) : M. H. A. Footitt (Nottinghamshire, Derbyshire, Surrey)
- **† James Foster** (2004–2018) : J. S. Foster (Essex)
- **Graeme Fowler** (1985–1988) : G. Fowler (Lancashire)
- Nigel Francis (1996–1997) : N. B. Francis (Trinidad & Tobago)
- **† Angus Fraser** (1987–1989) : A. R. C. Fraser (Middlesex)
- **Bruce French** (1985–1987) : B. N. French (Nottinghamshire)
- David Fulton (2002) : D. P. Fulton (Kent)

== G ==
- † Dan Gale (2008) : D. J. Gale (MCC)
- Mark Garaway (1997) : M. Garaway (Hampshire)
- **† Joel Garner** (1992) : J. Garner (Barbados, Somerset)
- **† Mike Gatting** (1978–1989) : M. W. Gatting (Middlesex)
- Alex Gidman (2004–2010) : A. P. R. Gidman (Gloucestershire, Worcestershire)
- † Will Gidman (2008) : W. R. S. Gidman (Durham, Gloucestershire, Nottinghamshire, Kent)
- **† Ashley Giles** (1996) : A. F. Giles (Warwickshire)
- Richard Gleeson (2018) : R. J. Gleeson (Northamptonshire, Lancashire)
- Ian Gould (1979) : I. J. Gould (Middlesex, Sussex)
- David Graveney (1978) : D. A. Graveney (Gloucestershire, Somerset, Durham)
- **† Mark Greatbatch** (1992) : M. J. Greatbatch (Auckland, Central Districts)
- **† Gordon Greenidge** (1987–1992) : C. G. Greenidge (Barbados, Hampshire)
- Lewis Gregory (2012–2017) : L. Gregory (Somerset)
- **† Ian Greig** (1982–1992) : I. A. Greig (Border, Sussex, Surrey)
- Chinmay Gupte (1999) : C. M. Gupte (OUCC)
- Harry Gurney (2014) : H. F. Gurney (Leicestershire, Nottinghamshire)

== H ==
- **Richard Hadlee** (1987) : R. J. Hadlee (Canterbury, Nottinghamshire)
- † Sam Hain (2017–2018) : S. R. Hain (Warwickshire)
- † Oliver Hannon-Dalby (2020) : O. J. Hannon-Dalby (Yorkshire, Warwickshire). Tours: Pakistan (2019/2020).
- Hameed Hassan (2011) : Hamid Hassan (Afghanistan)
- Arun Harinath (2008) : A. Harinath (Surrey)
- **Steve Harmison** (2007) : S. J. Harmison (Durham)
- James Harris (2016) : J. A. R. Harris (Glamorgan, Middlesex)
- Adam Harrison (2004) : A. J. Harrison (Glamorgan)
- David Harrison (2005) : D. S. Harrison (Glamorgan)
- **† Warren Hegg** (1990–1992) : W. K. Hegg (Lancashire)
- **Eddie Hemmings** (1989) : E. E. Hemmings (Warwickshire)
- Steve Henderson (1987) : S. P. Henderson (Worcestershire)
- **Graeme Hick** (1988–1991) : G. A. Hick (Worcestershire)
- James Hildreth (2015) : J. C. Hildreth (Somerset)
- † Kyle Hodnett (2008) : K. D. Hodnett (KwaZulu-Natal)
- Kyle Hogg (2014) : K. W. Hogg (Lancashire)
- Willie Hogg (1979–1981) : W. Hogg (Lancashire)
- **Matthew Hoggard** (2004–2007) : M. J. Hoggard (Yorkshire)
- John Hopkins (1978) : J. A. Hopkins (Glamorgan)
- Will House (1999/2000) : W. J. House (Kent, Sussex). Tours: Bangladesh (1999/2000).
- Geoff Humpage (1981) : G. W. Humpage (Warwickshire)
- **Nasser Hussain** (1991) : N. Hussain (Essex)
- Barry Hyam (1999/2000) : B. J. Hyam (Essex). Tours: Bangladesh (1999/2000).

== I ==
- **Richard Illingworth** (1991) : R. K. Illingworth (Worcestershire)
- † Imran Qayyum (2020) : Imran Qayyum (Kent). Tours: Pakistan (2019/2020).

== J ==
- † Kevin Jarvis (1990) : K. B. S. Jarvis (Kent, Gloucestershire)
- **Paul Jarvis** (1987) : P. W. Jarvis (Yorkshire)
- **Sanath Jayasuriya** (2007) : S. T. Jayasuriya (Bloomfield)
- **† Mahela Jayawardene** (2018) : D. P. M. D. Jayawardene (Sinhalese, Sussex, Somerset)
- **Prasanna Jayawardene** (2014) : H. A. P. W. Jayawardene (Nondescripts)
- Michael Jeh (1997) : M. P. W. Jeh (Oxford University)
- Trevor Jesty (1978) : T. E. Jesty (Hampshire, Surrey, Lancashire)
- † Kunal Jogia (2008) : K. A. Jogia (MCC)
- **Neil Johnson** (1999) : N. C. Johnson (Matabeleland)
- **Richard Johnson** (1999/2000) : R. L. Johnson (Middlesex, Somerset). Tours: Bangladesh (1999/2000).
- **Simon Jones** (2002–2004) : S. P. Jones (Glamorgan)
- **Ed Joyce** (2006–2008) : E. C. Joyce (Middlesex, Sussex, Leinster Lightning)

== K ==
- **Kabir Ali** (2009) : Kabir Ali (Worcestershire, Hampshire, Lancashire)
- Gary Keedy (2011) : G. Keedy (Yorkshire, Lancashire, Surrey)
- **Simon Kerrigan** (2013) : S. C. Kerrigan (Lancashire)
- **Rob Key** (2002–2009) : R. W. T. Key (Kent)
- † Kashif Ali (2018) : Kashif Ali (MCC)
- Neil Killeen (1999/2000) : N. Killeen (Durham). Tours: Bangladesh (1999/2000).
- **Reon King** (1999) : R. D. King (Guyana)
- Richard King (2007) : R. E. King (Northamptonshire)
- Peter Kippax (1987) : P. J. Kippax (Yorkshire, Durham)
- Steven Kirby (2008–2013) : S. P. Kirby (Yorkshire, Gloucestershire, Somerset)
- **James Kirtley** (2002) : R. J. Kirtley (Sussex)
- † Fred Klaassen (2020) : F. J. Klaassen (Kent). Tours: Pakistan (2019/2020).
- Sven Koenig (2004) : S. G. Koenig (Easterns, Western Province, Middlesex)
- Deon Kruis (2000–2001) : G. J. Kruis (Transvaal, Griqualand West, Yorkshire)

== L ==
- **Allan Lamb** (1985–1989) : A. J. Lamb (Northamptonshire)
- **Wayne Larkins** (1978–1989) : W. Larkins (Northamptonshire)
- Mark Lavender (1997) : M. P. Lavender (Western Australia)
- † **Stuart Law** (2008) : S. G. Law (Queensland, Essex, Lancashire, Derbyshire)
- **Dan Lawrence** (2019) : D. W. Lawrence (Essex)
- **David Lawrence** (1989–1990) : D. V. Lawrence (Gloucestershire)
- Andrew Lawson (1996–1999) : A. G. Lawson (Border, Eastern Province)
- **Jack Leach** (2017) : M. J. Leach (Somerset)
- † Michael Leask (2020) : M. A. Leask (Northamptonshire, Somerset). Tours: Pakistan (2019/2020).
- **Alex Lees** (2017) : A. Z. Lees (Yorkshire)
- **Jon Lewis** (2005–2010) : J. Lewis (Gloucestershire, Surrey)
- † Arron Lilley (2020) : A. M. Lilley (Lancashire, Leicestershire). Tours: Pakistan (2019/2020).
- **Andy Lloyd** (1984) : T. A. Lloyd (Warwickshire)
- Alex Loudon (2006–2007) : A. G. R. Loudon (Kent, Warwickshire)
- Jim Love (1978) : J. D. Love (Yorkshire)
- **Adam Lyth** (2017) : A. Lyth (Yorkshire)

== M ==
- **Sajid Mahmood** (2005–2009) : S. I. Mahmood (Lancashire, Essex)
- **Dawid Malan** (2010–2013) : D. J. Malan (Boland, Middlesex)
- **Neil Mallender** (1988) : N. A. Mallender (Northamptonshire, Somerset)
- **† Vic Marks** (1981–1989) : V. J. Marks (Somerset)
- **Hamish Marshall** (2012) : H. J. H. Marshall (Northern Districts, Gloucestershire)
- **Malcolm Marshall** (1987) : M. D. Marshall (Barbados, Hampshire)
- **Matthew Maynard** (1988) : M. P. Maynard (Glamorgan)
- **† Brendon McCullum** (2017) : B. B. McCullum (Otago, Canterbury, Glamorgan, Sussex, Warwickshire, Middlesex)
- **† Anthony McGrath** (1999/2000–2000) : A. McGrath (Yorkshire). Tours: Bangladesh (1999/2000).
- **Craig McMillan** (2007) : C. D. McMillan (Canterbury, Gloucestershire, Hampshire)
- † Stuart Meaker (2017) : S. C. Meaker (Surrey, Sussex)
- Keith Medlycott (1989) : K. T. Medlycott (Surrey)
- † Gehan Mendis (1989) : G. D. Mendis (Sussex, Lancashire)
- Ashley Metcalfe (1987) : A. A. Metcalfe (Yorkshire)
- Colin Metson (2001) : C. P. Metson (Middlesex, Glamorgan)
- James Middlebrook (2010–2013) : J. D. Middlebrook (Yorkshire, Essex, Northamptonshire)
- † Jonathan Miles (2008) : J. S. Miles (Lincolnshire, Norfolk)
- **† Misbah-ul-Haq** (2017) : Misbah-ul-Haq (Faisalabad)
- Daryl Mitchell (2015) : D. K. H. Mitchell (Worcestershire)
- **Mohammad Nabi** (2007–2011) : Mohammad Nabi (Afghanistan)
- **Moeen Ali** (2012) : Moeen Ali (Worcestershire)
- **† Peter Moor** (2018) : P. J. Moor (Mid West Rhinos)
- Stephen Moore (2009–2011) : S. C. Moore (Worcestershire, Lancashire, Derbyshire)
- **Hugh Morris** (1989–1996) : H. Morris (Glamorgan)
- James Morris (2007) : J. C. Morris (Berkshire)
- **John Morris** (1987–1990) : J. E. Morris (Derbyshire, Durham, Nottinghamshire)
- **Martyn Moxon** (1985–1990) : M. D. Moxon (Yorkshire)
- **† Tim Munton** (1991–1996) : T. A. Munton (Warwickshire)
- **† Tim Murtagh** (2010–2017) : T. J. Murtagh (Surrey, Middlesex)

== N ==
- Graham Napier (2004) : G. R. Napier (Essex)
- **Naved-ul-Hasan** (2012) : Naved-ul-Hasan (W&PDA, Sussex, Yorkshire)
- Paul Newman (1982) : P. G. Newman (Derbyshire)
- Scott Newman (2010) : S. A. Newman (Surrey, Middlesex)
- Mark Nicholas (1984–1988) : M. C. J. Nicholas (Hampshire)
- Paul Nixon (1999/2000) : P. A. Nixon (Leicestershire). Tours: Bangladesh (1999/2000).
- Sam Northeast (2013–2018) : S. A. Northeast (Kent, Hampshire)

== O ==
- **Niall O'Brien** (2012) : N. J. O'Brien (Northamptonshire, Leicestershire, North West Warriors)
- **Graham Onions** (2007–2016) : G. Onions (Durham)
- Rodney Ontong (1987) : R. C. Ontong (Glamorgan)
- **Craig Overton** (2017) : C. Overton (Somerset)
- **Owais Shah** (2002–2008) : O. A. Shah (Middlesex)

== P ==
- **Monty Panesar** (2006–2014) : M. S. Panesar (Northamptonshire, Sussex, Essex)
- Luke Parker (2006) : L. C. Parker (MCC)
- **Paul Parker** (1979–1990) : P. W. G. Parker (Sussex)
- † Bobby Parks (1990) : R. J. Parks (Hampshire, Kent)
- Stephen Parry (2019) : S. D. Parry (Lancashire)
- **Min Patel** (1999/2000–2004) : M. M. Patel (Kent). Tours: Bangladesh (1999/2000).
- **† Samit Patel** (2014–2020) : S. R. Patel (Nottinghamshire). Tours: Pakistan (2019/2020).
- Stephen Peters (2011–2012) : S. D. Peters (Essex, Worcestershire, Northamptonshire)
- Mark Pettini (2005) : M. L. Pettini (Essex, Leicestershire)
- Andy Pick (1991) : R. A. Pick (Nottinghamshire)
- **Kevin Pietersen** (2004) : K. P. Pietersen (Hampshire, Surrey)
- **Liam Plunkett** (2017) : L. E. Plunkett (Durham, Yorkshire)
- **William Porterfield** (2007) : W. T. S. Porterfield (Gloucestershire, Warwickshire, North West Warriors)
- Mike Powell (2004–2005) : M. J. Powell (Warwickshire)
- Mike Powell (2004) : M. J. Powell (Glamorgan)
- **Derek Pringle** (1982) : D. R. Pringle (Essex)
- **Meyrick Pringle** (1989) : M. W. Pringle (Eastern Province)
- **Matt Prior** (2005) : M. J. Prior (Sussex)
- Christopher Prowting (2007) : C. G. Prowting (MCC)
- † David Pryke (2000) : D. J. Pryke (Natal)

== R ==
- **† Mark Ramprakash** (1989–2012) : M. R. Ramprakash (Middlesex, Surrey)
- **Adil Rashid** (2007–2009) : A. U. Rashid (Yorkshire)
- Delray Rawlins (2018) : D. M. W. Rawlins (Sussex)
- Ollie Rayner (2014) : O. P. Rayner (Middlesex)
- **† Chris Read** (2002–2017) : C. M. W. Read (Nottinghamshire)
- Luis Reece (2014) : L. M. Reece (Lancashire, Derbyshire)
- Gareth Rees (2012) : G. P. Rees (Glamorgan)
- **Dermot Reeve** (1990) : D. A. Reeve (Warwickshire)
- **Steve Rhodes** (1991) : S. J. Rhodes (Yorkshire, Worcestershire)
- † Will Rhodes (2019–2020) : W. M. H. Rhodes (Yorkshire, Warwickshire). Tours: Pakistan (2019/2020).
- Clive Rice (1987) : C. E. B. Rice (Transvaal, Nottinghamshire)
- **Jack Richards** (1982–1987) : C. J. Richards (Surrey)
- Mali Richards (2007) : M. A. Richards (Leeward Islands)
- Alan Richardson (2012) : A. Richardson (Warwickshire, Middlesex, Worcestershire)
- **Mark Richardson** (2001) : M. H. Richardson (Auckland, Otago)
- **† Richie Richardson** (1992) : R. B. Richardson (Leeward Islands, Yorkshire)
- Adam Riley (2015) : A. E. N. Riley (Kent)
- David Ripley (1988) : D. Ripley (Northamptonshire)
- Jonathan Robinson (1999–2000) : J. D. Robinson (Surrey)
- Martin Robinson (1988–1989) : M. J. Robinson (MCC)
- **Tim Robinson** (1985–1987) : R. T. Robinson (Nottinghamshire)
- **Sam Robson** (2014) : S. D. Robson (Middlesex)
- Peter Roebuck (1980) : P. M. Roebuck (Somerset)
- **Chris Rogers** (2011) : C. J. L. Rogers (Western Australia, Victoria)
- **Toby Roland-Jones** (2011) : T. S. Roland-Jones (Middlesex)
- † Mike Roseberry (2000) : M. A. Roseberry (Middlesex, Durham)
- † Chris Rushworth (2013–2017) : C. Rushworth (Durham)
- **Jack Russell** (1988–1989) : R. C. Russell (Gloucestershire)
- **† Ken Rutherford** (1992) : K. R. Rutherford (Otago)

== S ==
- **Martin Saggers** (2004) : M. J. Saggers (Kent)
- David Sales (2010) : D. J. G. Sales (Northamptonshire)
- **† Kumar Sangakkara** (2020) : K. C. Sangakkara (Warwickshire, Durham, Surrey). Tours: Pakistan (2019/2020).
- **Virender Sehwag** (2014) : V. Sehwag (Delhi)
- Shaaiq Choudhry (2007) : Shaaiq Choudhry (Worcestershire)
- **Shahid Afridi** (2001) : Shahid Afridi (Karachi)
- † Safyaan Sharif (2020) : S. M. Sharif (Scotland). Tours: Pakistan (2019/2020).
- Kevin Sharp (1979) : K. Sharp (Yorkshire)
- **Ravi Shastri** (1987) : R. J. Shastri (Bombay)
- Charlie Shreck (2008) : C. E. Shreck (Nottinghamshire)
- **Dom Sibley** (2019) : D. P. Sibley (Surrey, Warwickshire)
- **Arnie Sidebottom** (1985) : A. Sidebottom (Yorkshire)
- **† Chris Silverwood** (1996) : C. E. W. Silverwood (Yorkshire)
- John Simpson (2018) : J. A. Simpson (Middlesex)
- **Gladstone Small** (1988) : G. C. Small (Warwickshire)
- Ben Smith (1999/2000) : B. F. Smith (Leicestershire). Tours: Bangladesh (1999/2000).
- **Chris Smith** (1984) : C. L. Smith (Hampshire)
- David Smith (1981) : K. D. Smith (Warwickshire)
- **Robin Smith** (1989) : R. A. Smith (Hampshire)
- † Tom Smith (2018) : T. F. Smith (Glamorgan)
- **John Stephenson** (2004–2006) : J. P. Stephenson (Essex)
- Darren Stevens (2002) : D. I. Stevens (Leicestershire)
- **Graham Stevenson** (1978) : G. B. Stevenson (Yorkshire)
- **Paul Strang** (1996–1999) : P. A. Strang (Mashonaland)
- **Andrew Strauss** (2002) : A. J. Strauss (Middlesex)
- **Graeme Swann** (2005) : G. P. Swann (Nottinghamshire)

== T ==
- **Chris Tavaré** (1979–1982) : C. J. Tavaré (Kent)
- **James Taylor** (2010) : J. W. A. Taylor (Nottinghamshire)
- **† Paul Terry** (1990) : V. P. Terry (Hampshire)
- David Thomas (1985) : D. J. Thomas (Surrey)
- **Greg Thomas** (1987) : J. G. Thomas (Glamorgan)
- **Graham Thorpe** (1991–2004) : G. P. Thorpe (Surrey)
- Chris Townsend (2000) : C. J. Townsend (OUCC)
- **James Tredwell** (2004–2016) : J. C. Tredwell (Kent)
- Peter Trego (2013–2019) : P. D. Trego (Somerset, Nottinghamshire)
- † Tim Tremlett (1990) : T. M. Tremlett (Hampshire)
- **† Jonathan Trott** (2018) : I. J. L. Trott (Warwickshire)
- Harvey Trump (1988) : H. R. J. Trump (Somerset)
- **† Phil Tufnell** (1990) : P. C. R. Tufnell (Middlesex)

== U ==
- **Usman Afzaal** (2002) : Usman Afzaal (Nottinghamshire)

== V ==
- † Roelof van der Merwe (2020) : R. E. van der Merwe (Titans, Somerset). Tours: Pakistan (2019/2020).
- **Michael Vaughan** (2009) : M. P. Vaughan (Yorkshire)
- † Kosie Venter (1996) : J. F. Venter (Orange Free State)

== W ==
- Alan Walker (1988) : A. Walker (Northamptonshire)
- † David Ward (2000–2001) : D. M. Ward (Surrey)
- Michael Warden (1999) : M. J. Warden (MCC)
- **Steve Watkin** (1989–1991) : S. L. Watkin (Glamorgan)
- **† Mike Watkinson** (1989) : M. Watkinson (Lancashire)
- † Mark Watt (2018) : M. R. J. Watt (Lancashire, Derbyshire)
- Colin Wells (1981–1988) : C. M. Wells (Sussex)
- Riki Wessels (2004) : M. H. Wessels (Northamptonshire)
- **Tom Westley** (2007–2019) : T. Westley (Essex)
- **James Whitaker** (1987) : J. J. Whitaker (Leicestershire)
- John Whitehouse (1978) : J. Whitehouse (Warwickshire)
- † Ross Whiteley (2020) : R. A. Whiteley (Derbyshire, Worcestershire). Tours: Pakistan (2019/2020).
- † Jonathan Wileman (2000) : J. R. Wileman (MCC)
- Kelvin Williams (1999) : K. C. Williams (MCC)
- **Neil Williams** (1984–1985) : N. F. Williams (Middlesex)
- Richard Williams (1984–1988) : R. G. Williams (Northamptonshire)
- Robbie Williams (2007) : R. E. M. Williams (Middlesex)
- **Charl Willoughby** (2001–2004) : C. M. Willoughby (Western Province)
- Hugh Wilson (1980) : P. H. L. Wilson (Surrey)
- **Chris Woakes** (2009) : C. R. Woakes (Warwickshire)
- † Matthew Wood (1999/2000–2007) : M. J. Wood (Yorkshire). Tours: Bangladesh (1999/2000).
- Matthew Wood (2007) : M. J. Wood (Somerset)
- Matthew Wood (2007) : M. J. Wood (MCC)
- † Robert Woodman (2008) : R. J. Woodman (Gloucestershire)
- Ian Wrigglesworth (2000) : I. A. Wrigglesworth (MCC)
- † Tony Wright (1990) : A. J. Wright (Gloucestershire)

== Y ==
- **† Yasir Shah** (2017) : Yasir Shah (Kent)
- Gary Yates (1999/2000) : G. Yates (Lancashire). Tours: Bangladesh (1999/2000).

== Z ==
- **Zafar Ansari** (2015) : Zafar Ansari (Surrey)
- Zoheb Sharif (2007) : Zoheb Sharif (MCC)

== See also ==
- Lists of Marylebone Cricket Club players
