= Brendan Nash =

Jamaican-Australian cricketer

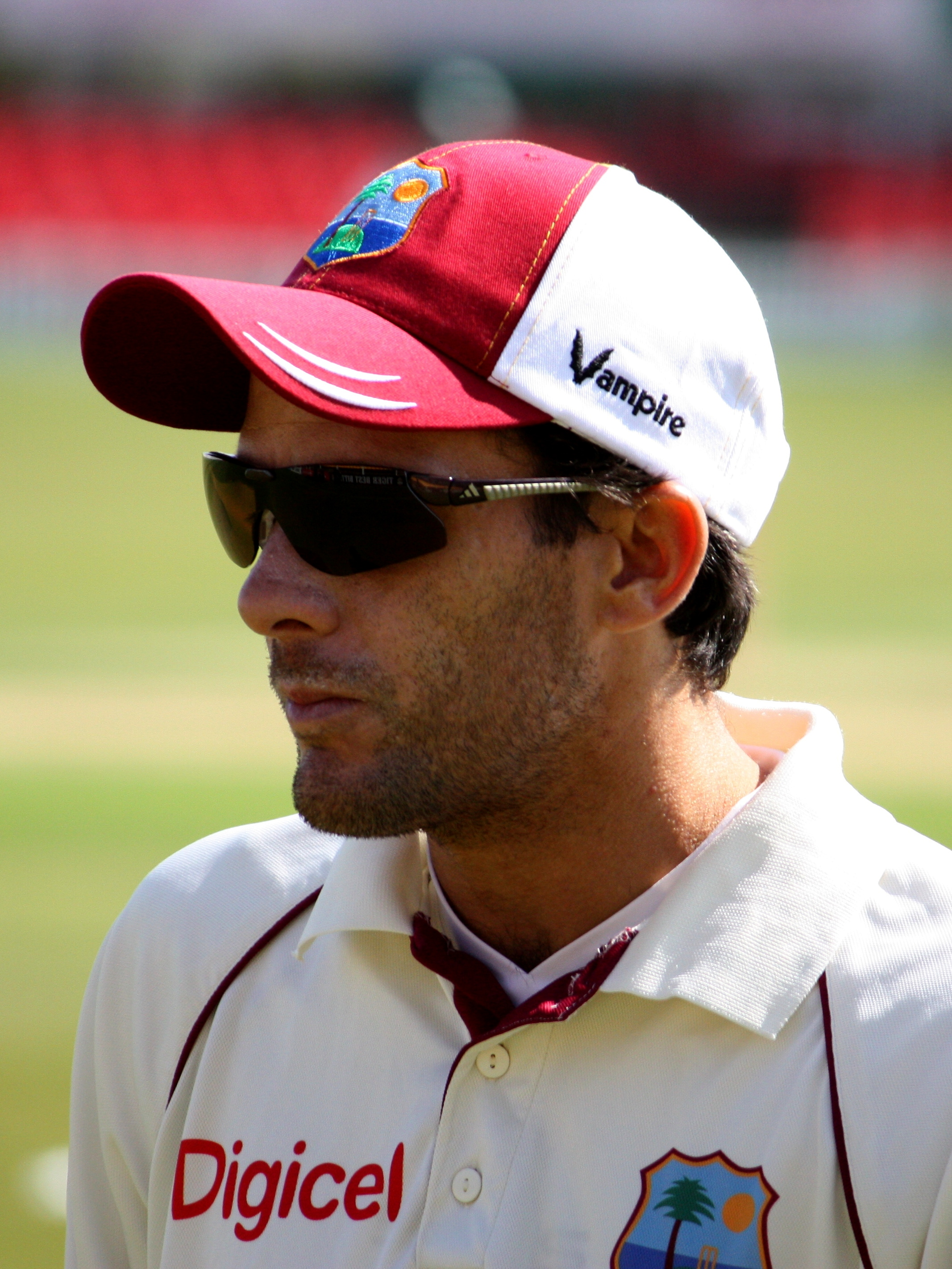

Personal information
- Full name: Brendan Paul Nash
- Born: 14 December 1977 (age 48); Attadale, Western Australia
- Nickname: Bubba
- Height: 5 ft 8 in (1.73 m)
- Batting: Left-handed
- Bowling: Left-arm medium
- Role: Batsman

International information
- National side: West Indies
- Test debut (cap 272): 11 December 2008 v New Zealand
- Last Test: 23 June 2011 v India
- ODI debut (cap 143): 20 August 2008 v Bermuda
- Last ODI: 13 January 2009 v New Zealand
- ODI shirt no.: 49

Domestic team information
- Years: Team
- 2000/01–2006/07: Queensland
- 2007/08–2011/12: Jamaica (squad no. 49)
- 2012–2015: Kent (squad no. 40)

Career statistics
Competition	Test	ODI	FC	LA
Matches	21	9	139	88
Runs scored	1,103	104	7,752	1,596
Batting average	33.42	26.00	38.95	31.92
100s/50s	2/8	0/0	18/32	0/8
Top score	114	39*	207	98*
Balls bowled	492	294	1,657	798
Wickets	2	5	23	16
Bowling average	123.50	44.80	34.82	35.12
5 wickets in innings	0	0	0	0
10 wickets in match	0	0	0	0
Best bowling	1/34	3/56	2/7	4/20
Catches/stumpings	6/–	1/–	50/–	28/–
- Source: CricInfo, 30 January 2016

Brendan Paul Nash (born 14 December 1977) is a Jamaican Australian former professional cricketer who played Test and One Day International cricket for West Indies. He played first-class cricket for Jamaica, Queensland and Kent.

== Early life ==
Brendan Nash was born in Attadale, Western Australia. He lived in Perth, Cairns and Brisbane and studied at Nudgee College in 1993–94. Brendan Nash qualified to play for Jamaica through his father, Paul, a Jamaican Olympic swimmer.

== Domestic career ==
=== Australia ===
Nash played grade cricket in Brisbane, and was leading run scorer in the 1999–2000 Brisbane XXXX competition. Before breaking into the senior team, Nash represented Queensland at under-19 level as well as playing for the Queensland Colts and Queensland Academy of Sport (QAS). On one occasion, Nash was pressed into service as a makeshift wicket-keeper for QAS when the first choice keeper was injured with a suspected broken thumb. Nash made his debut for the Queensland Bulls in 2001 when he came into the team as cover for injured batsman Martin Love. He scored his maiden first-class century in 2002 when he batted at number four and scored 157 as Queensland defeated the Southern Redbacks at the Adelaide Oval. Nash was promoted to open for Queensland and cemented his place there. In the 2001/02 Pura Cup final, Nash scored 96 against the Tasmanian Tigers as Queensland won the cup. He achieved a cult following with a "Brendan Nash Fan Club" founded among university students in Brisbane.

At the start of the 2002–03 season, Nash scored 176 and 81 not out against the New South Wales Blues. However, his form slipped away and he did not reach 40 in his next 20 innings. He struggled to hold down a place in the Queensland second XI. He was denied a contract with the Queensland Bulls for the 2004–05 season as a result of his poor run of form.

=== West Indies ===
After not being given a contract with the Queensland Bulls for the 2007–08 season, Nash decided to try to restart his career by moving to the West Indies. Speaking of his decision, he said "I was obviously very disappointed to miss out on a contract, but I pretty much got told it would be hard for me to work my way back in again and I felt I still have something to offer". In October 2007, Nash was named in the Jamaican squad. Nash played a key role in Jamaica winning the KFC Cup. In the final, he scored 117 as his team beat Trinidad and Tobago by nine wickets. Nash finished the season with 422 first-class runs at 46.88 to his name from the domestic competition and was third in the batting averages. There was surprise in some quarters when Nash was not selected for the Test series against Australia in 2008.

During the semi-final of the 2010/11 Regional Four Day Competition, Nash scored his highest first-class score. The innings of 207 runs came from 349 balls, and bettered his previous best of 176 runs. Though the semi-final against Trinidad and Tobago ended in a draw, Jamaica faced Combined Campuses and Colleges in the final. Nash was unable to bat for Jamaica due to injury, but the team went on to win the match by eight wickets.

=== England ===
Having identified his limited-over batting as an area he wanted to improve on (he scored only 67 runs in five matches) he decided to play for Monton & Weaste CC in the Central Lancashire League (CLL) during the Caribbean's off-season (summer 2008 in England). His role as the club's professional cricketer helped him financially to play in Jamaica. During his stint in England, Nash played a major part in Monton & Weaste CC defeating Heywood CC in the CLL Wood Cup final on 3 August 2008. Nash was named man of the match for scoring scored 46 not out as Monton & Weaste won by seven wickets.

In 2009, Brendan Nash joined East Lancs in the Lancashire League as professional when their original professional did not arrive. He had a superb first season scoring 874 runs in 16 league innings at an average of 72.83 with a high score of 140 and taking 47 wickets at an average of 12.25 from 221.4 overs with best bowling figures of 7/21. In the 20/20 competition he averaged a staggering 257 scoring 257 runs in 4 games and only being out once with a high score of 109 not out. He also took 10 wickets in 14.3 overs at an average of 7.8 with best bowling figures of 3/1.

In 2012, Nash, having been dropped from the West Indies national team, signed for Kent, for the 2012 English county cricket season. He stayed on for the 2013 season as well. On 13 July 2013, Nash guided Kent to an unlikely County Championship win against Gloucestershire, needing a huge total of 411 to win, Nash scored 199 not out, before having to retire due to sunstroke after playing in temperatures of 30C. The tail then got the remaining 21 runs needed and Kent won their first game of the season. He left the club by mutual consent in August 2015 having played mainly in the Second XI during the 2015 season.

== International career ==
On 5 November 2005, Nash fielded for Australia as a substitute in a Test match against the West Indies, for whom he would later play. He dropped a catch fielding at point. On 12 August 2008 Nash was named in the West Indies One Day International (ODI) squad to play in the tri-series against Bermuda and Canada. He made his ODI debut on 20 August 2008 – along with batsman Leon Johnson and bowler Kemar Roach – when the West Indies played Bermuda. He bowled in the first innings and achieved figures of 10–1–43–1; his first international wicket was that of Delyone Borden, caught behind by wicket keeper Carlton Baugh. Batting at number five, Nash shared in an unbeaten partnership of 69 with vice-captain, Ramnaresh Sarwan to see the West Indies to a six wicket victory; Nash scored 27 not out. In the second match of the series, against Canada, Nash scored 39 not out batting at number six, sharing in an unbeaten 111 run partnership with Xavier Marshall who in that innings broke the record for most sixes in an ODI innings. He finished with figures of 10–1–56–3. In the final that followed, also against Canada, Nash took 1/33 and did not bat as the West Indies won by seven wickets.

On 1 November 2008, the ODI squad to tour Pakistan was announced, with Nash as one of the members. John Dyson, the West Indies coach, stated that Nash's performance against Canada and Bermuda had shown he was ready to perform against leading cricket teams such as Pakistan. On the same day, it was announced that Nash was one of four players – along with Lionel Baker, Leon Johnson, and Kemar Roach – without a Test cap to be named in the 15-man squad selected to tour New Zealand for a Test series. Dyson said that he expected Nash's bowling to "be a handful on the New Zealand wickets".

Nash made his Test debut for the West Indies on 11 December 2008, playing against New Zealand. In the same match, fast-bowler Lionel Baker also made his debut. It was widely reported in the media that he was the first white man to play for the West Indies since Geoff Greenidge played five Tests in the early 1970s. He was subjected to racial abuse for being a "white boy" during trials for Jamaica. Chris Gayle, Jamaica's captain, helped Nash telling him that "You are one of us, don't worry about what anyone's saying to you. If anyone troubles you, I am here for you." It later emerged that he was of mixed race. He took his first Test wicket in the third Test against England when Matt Prior was caught by Shivnarine Chanderpaul off Nash's bowling. During the fifth Test in Trinidad Nash scored his maiden Test century, his innings of 109 included 17 fours. He shared a 234-run fifth wicket partnership with Chanderpaul. Nash continued his good form in the first Test against England with 81 during a 143-run partnership with Denesh Ramdin who made 61.

In November 2009, less than a year after making his Test debut, Nash was awarded a central retainer contract with the West Indies Cricket Board (WICB). Nash was appointed West Indies vice-captain in October 2010. The previous captain and vice, Chris Gayle and Dwayne Bravo, had chosen not to sign central contracts with the WICB and were replaced. In the final fixture of the three-match series, Nash passed 1,000 Test runs. The series was a 0–0 draw with bad weather curtailing the matches. Nash scored 160 runs at an average of 53.33. Nash was the third-highest run-scorer for the 2010/11 season of the Caribbean regional first-class tournament, scoring 626 runs from nine matches at an average of 62.60; Jamaica won the tournament. In the semi-final of the competition, Nash scored his maiden first-class double century, scoring 207 runs off 349 balls and beating his previous highest score of 176. Pakistan toured the West Indies in April and May 2011, and Nash was selected for the two-Test series. The series was drawn 1–1, with West Indies securing their first Test victory in nearly two years. Nash scored 44 runs in four innings. Between 13 October 2007 and 27 May 2011, Nash scored 1,093 Test runs for West Indies at an average of 35.25, with only Shivnarine Chanderpaul, Chris Gayle, and Ramnaresh Sarwan scoring more for the team. India toured in June and following a run of poor form – scoring 53 runs in his last six innings – was dropped after the first Test. In October, Nash's central contract with the WICB was allowed to lapse.

== Post-retirement life ==
After retiring, Nash moved back to Australia, and set up a mortgage broker firm in Brisbane.

== Career Best Performances ==
Updated 1 October 2013

	Batting				Bowling (innings)			
	Score	Fixture	Venue	Season	Figures	Fixture	Venue	Season
Tests	114	West Indies v South Africa	Basseterre	2010	1/21	West Indies v Sri Lanka	Galle	2010
ODI	39*	West Indies v Canada	King City	2008	3/56	West Indies v Canada	King City	2008
FC	207	Jamaica v Trinidad and Tobago	Saint Augustine	2011	2/7	Jamaica v Combined Campuses and Colleges	Kingston	2008
LA	98*	Kent Spitfires v Warwickshire Bears	Birmingham	2013	4/20	Jamaica v Guyana	Bridgetown	2007
T20	26	Kent Spitfires v Essex Eagles	Chelmsford	2012	1/32	Kent Spitfires v Sussex Sharks	Hove	2012
