= Bowcock =

Bowcock is a surname. Notable people with the surname include:

- Benny Bowcock (1879–1961), American baseball player
- Philip Bowcock (born 1968), English accountant and executive

== See also ==
- Bocock
- Boocock
