= Monton & Weaste Cricket Club =

Monton & Weaste Cricket Club
League	Central Lancashire League
Ground	Ellesmere Park, Eccles, Greater Manchester
CLL History	Joined 2005

Monton & Weaste Cricket Club were a cricket club in the Central Lancashire League who played at Ellesmere Park in Eccles, Greater Manchester, England. They fielded a First and Second team after joining the league in 2005. They were originally recruited so that the league would return to sixteen member clubs, but Stand later announced their resignation for the 2005 season.

The club formed in 1998 when Monton merged with Weaste Cricket Club, following a decline in the latter’s playing resources over previous years. Both clubs were longstanding members of the Manchester and District Cricket Association. Monton had been a member of the Manchester Association since replacing Stockport in 1937. Stockport had left to join the CLL, but resigned in 1998. Monton & Weaste were chosen to replace them in 2004, ahead of five other applicants. In 2020 Monton, by then playing in the Greater Manchester Cricket League, reverted to their original name.
