= Boocock =

Boocock is a surname of English origin. At the time of the British Census of 1881, its frequency was highest in Yorkshire (8.0 times the British average), followed by Lancashire and Northumberland. In all other British counties its frequency was below national average. The name Boocock may refer to:

- Irvine Boocock (born 1890, died unknown), English footballer
- Joan Boocock Lee (1922–2017), English-American voice actress and wife of comic artist Stan Lee
- Nigel Boocock (1937–2015), English speedway rider
- Eric Boocock (born 1945), English speedway rider
- Mark Boocock (born 1963), English cricketer
- Paul Boocock (born 1964), American actor and writer
- Justin Boocock (born 1975), Australian slalom canoer
