= Wrigglesworth =

Wrigglesworth is an English surname. Notable people with the surname include:

- Billy Wrigglesworth (1912–1980), English footballer
- Brian Wrigglesworth (c. 1935 – 2015), rugby league footballer who played in the 1950s, 1960s and 1970s, and coached in the 1970s
- Ian Wrigglesworth (born 1939), British politician
- Ian Wrigglesworth (cricketer) (born 1967), Australian cricketer
- Tom Wrigglesworth (born 1976), English stand-up comedian
- Nadine Wrigglesworth (born 1990), English Strategic HR Professional
- Wrigglesworth, a member of the group Public Service Broadcasting

== See also ==
- Geoff Wriglesworth, English rugby league footballer of the 1960s and 1970s
