= Bruce Hara =

Australian cricketer

Personal information
- Full name: Bruce Donald Hara
- Born: 28 April 1975 (age 51); Canberra, Australian Capital Territory
- Batting: Right-handed
- Bowling: Right-arm medium

Domestic team information
- Years: Team
- 1998/99: ACT Comets

Career statistics
Competition	List A
Matches	2
Runs scored	1
Batting average	0.50
100s/50s	0/0
Top score	1
Catches/stumpings	0/–
- Source: CricInfo, 29 August 2020

Bruce Donald Hara (born 28 April 1975) is a former cricketer who played List A cricket for the ACT Comets in the Mercantile Mutual Cup.

Hara, who was born in Canberra, made two appearances for the Comets in Australia's domestic one-day competition, both in the 1998/99 season. On debut he was run out for one by Michael Hussey at Manuka Oval and in his other match, at Adelaide Oval, he was trapped LBW for a duck by fast bowler Paul Wilson.

He has also played cricket in England before and after his season at the Comets, with stints as a professional for Lancashire clubs Barnoldswick and Heywood.
