= Michael Warden =

Australian cricketer (born 1967)

Personal information
- Full name: Michael John Warden
- Born: 9 November 1967 (age 59); Herston, Queensland, Australia
- Batting: Right-handed
- Bowling: Right-arm fast-medium

Domestic team information
- Years: Team
- 1999: Marylebone Cricket Club

Career statistics
Competition	First-class
Matches	1
Runs scored	2
Batting average	2.00
100s/50s	–/–
Top score	2
Balls bowled	144
Wickets	1
Bowling average	48.00
5 wickets in innings	–
10 wickets in match	–
Best bowling	1/33
Catches/stumpings	1/–
- Source: Cricinfo, 27 October 2018

Michael John Warden (born 9 November 1967) is a former Australian first-class cricketer.

Born at Herston in Brisbane, Warden played country cricket for Queensland from 1990 to 1995, later earning a place on the Australian Country Cricket Hall of Fame. During the Australian winter, Warden played club cricket in England for Stand in the Central Lancashire Cricket League from 1993–1998. While in England in 1999, Warden played a single first-class cricket match for the Marylebone Cricket Club (MCC) against Sri Lanka A at Shenley. In the Sri Lanka A first-innings, he took the wicket of Tillakaratne Dilshan. He wasn't called upon to bat in the MCC first-innings, but did bat in their second-innings, scoring 2 runs before he was dismissed leg before by Ravindra Pushpakumara.
