= Martin Robinson =

Martin or Marty Robinson may refer to:

- Martin Robinson (footballer) (born 1957), English footballer
- Martin P. Robinson (born 1954), puppeteer for the Jim Henson Company
- Martin Robinson (tennis) (born 1955), British tennis player
- Marty Robinson (announcer) (born 1932), staff announcer at Channel 11, Chicago, US
- Martin Robinson (cricketer) (born 1962), English cricketer
- Marty Robinson (gay activist) (1942–1992), American gay activist
- Martin David Robinson, the birth name of Marty Robbins, (1925–1982), American musician and NASCAR driver
