= Paul Wiseman =

New Zealand cricketer

Personal information
- Full name: Paul John Wiseman
- Born: 4 May 1970 (age 56); Auckland, New Zealand
- Batting: Right-handed
- Bowling: Right-arm offbreak

International information
- National side: New Zealand (1998–2005)
- Test debut (cap 205): 27 May 1998 v Sri Lanka
- Last Test: 11 April 2005 v Sri Lanka
- ODI debut (cap 105): 20 April 1998 v India
- Last ODI: 20 May 2003 v Pakistan

Domestic team information
- Years: Team
- 1991/92–1993/94: Auckland
- 1994/95–2000/01: Otago
- 2001/02–2005/06: Canterbury
- 2006–2008: Durham

Career statistics
Competition	Test	ODI	FC	LA
Matches	25	15	186	120
Runs scored	366	45	4,254	968
Batting average	14.07	22.50	20.95	15.36
100s/50s	0/0	0/0	2/16	0/2
Top score	36	16	130	65*
Balls bowled	5,660	450	34,292	4,789
Wickets	61	12	466	84
Bowling average	47.59	30.66	33.74	40.64
5 wickets in innings	2	0	18	0
10 wickets in match	0	0	4	0
Best bowling	5/82	4/45	9/13	4/45
Catches/stumpings	11/–	2/–	79/–	28/–
Medal record
Representing New Zealand
Men's Cricket
Commonwealth Games
Bronze medal – third place	1998 Kuala Lumpur	List-A cricket
- Source: ESPNcricinfo, 4 May 2017

Paul John Wiseman (born 4 May 1970) is a New Zealand former international cricketer. "Wiz", as he was nicknamed, was an off spinner who took nine wickets in an innings for Canterbury against Central Districts in Christchurch to record the second best bowling figures in New Zealand domestic cricket. Internationally, however, he was unable to forge a significant career due to the incumbency of first-choice spinner Daniel Vettori. Wiseman was a member of the New Zealand team that won the 2000 ICC KnockOut Trophy.

== Domestic career ==
Wiseman was born at Auckland in 1970 and educated at Long Bay College in the city. He played for Auckland age-group sides during the 1989–90 season before making his first-class cricket debut for the Auckland cricket team in January 1992. He played for the side for three seasons before moving to play for Otago in 1994–95. After 85 matches for Otago across seven seasons, Wiseman moved to play for Canterbury in 2001–02, playing another 85 matches for the side in the five seasons he played.

Having played for several seasons in English club cricket, including for Winchester Cricket Club and for Lancashire League sides Rishton and Haslingden, Wiseman spent the 2005 season as the professional with the Central Lancashire Cricket League side Milnrow. He made connections with Durham County Cricket Club, playing Second XI cricket for the county in 2005 before making his County Championship debut the following season. He signed for the side for the following two seasons and played 45 top-level matches for the side between 2006 and 2008. At the end of the 2009, having been overlooked for the spinners berth throughout the season in the county First XI, he retired from professional cricket at the age of 39.

== International career ==
On his Test Match debut, he took five wickets in the second innings against Sri Lanka in Colombo in 1998.

== After cricket ==
Wiseman returned to New Zealand taking up the position of Network Coach for Canterbury Cricket in October 2009. He led both the Canterbury Under 17 and Under 19 teams to wins at their National tournaments in the 2009/10 season.

Wiseman is the coach of the New Zealand national under-19 cricket team for the 2020 Under-19 Cricket World Cup in South Africa.

== See also ==
- List of New Zealand cricketers who have taken five-wicket hauls on Test debut
