= Bury Cricket Club =

Coordinates: 53.5835°N 2.3024°W

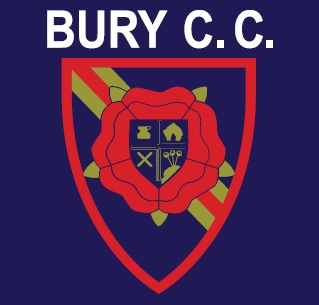
- Twenty20 name: Bury Bullsharks

Personnel
- Captain: Josh Scully
- Chairman: Mark Smith

Team information
- Colours: Navy & Red + Gold piping
- Founded: 1845
- Home ground: Radcliffe Road, BL9 9JX

History
- BDCA Cross Cup wins: 2014
- MDCA Surridge Trophy wins: 2014
- Official website: burycc.co.uk

Bury Cricket Club is a cricket club in the Greater Manchester Cricket League (GMCL), which plays its home games at Bury Sports and Social Club on Radcliffe Road, Bury, Greater Manchester. As of 2026 the 1st XI captain is Josh Scully.

== History of the Club ==
The club was founded in 1845, initially playing its cricket in the Townside district of the town. However, the arrival of the Lancashire and Yorkshire Railway required the club to seek pastures new. They then located to Foundry Street in the town, but this land was also required for development, with the building of Barlow's Mill in 1852.

Once again the club had to move and found a site at Buckley Wells, currently Bury Grammar School's playing fields, where they stayed until 1922.

In 1919, Samuel Roberts provided land on Radcliffe Road to be used for sporting facilities for the people of Bury following the end of the Great War. It was here that Bury Cricket Club finally settled and this land is now Bury Sports & Social Club where the grounds are used by both the cricket club and Bury Rugby Union Football Club. The club also has a Squash section and Bury Chess Club also use the facilities.

Historically, records of cricket matches at Radcliffe Road can be found right back to the late 1840s including a game in 1888 where Bury took on a team of touring Parsees. The ground has also hosted two Lancashire County Cricket Club 2nd XI matches, the first against Northumberland County Cricket Club in 1908 and the second against Nottinghamshire County Cricket Club 2nd XI in 1953.

In the 1930s the annual tour to North Wales was begun, which still continues to this day. More recently, in 1996, the club went professional, and in recent years has employed first class players from around the world.

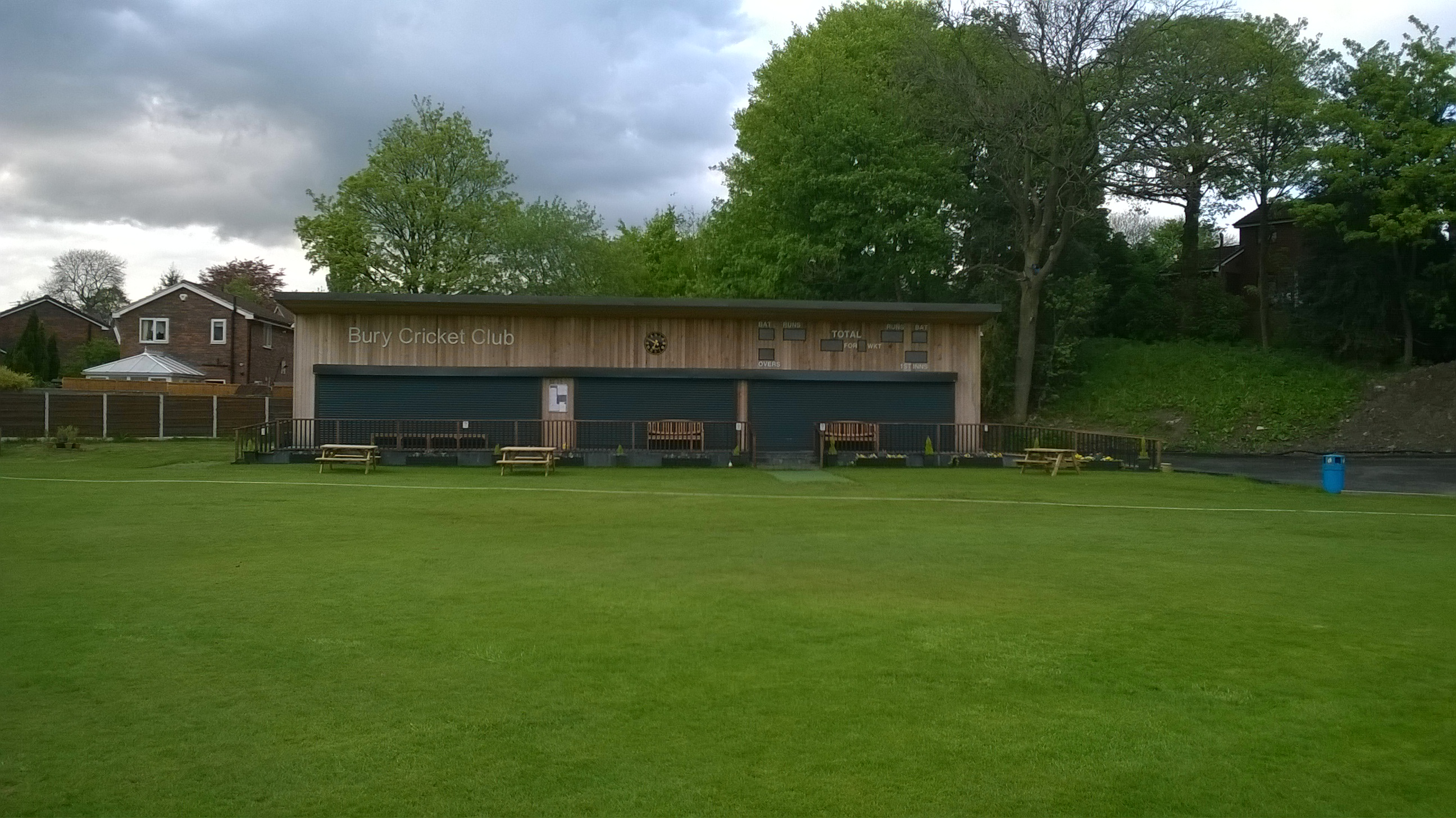
The new pavilion at Bury CC opened in 2013

As part of the NatWest Bank Cricket Force initiative, Bury CC were nominated for, and won, the Lancashire Cricket Board OSCA (Outstanding Service to Cricket Award) in 2013. This was due to all the work that was put in getting the ground ready for the 2013 season and particularly the finishing work that was done on the new pavilion.

In 2020, the club was due to celebrate its 175th anniversary, however celebrations were postponed due to the COVID-19 pandemic. In August 2021, the club released a short feature film '175 Anniversary Story' celebrating the history of the club, and the individuals that had contributed so greatly.

== Cricket History ==
Bury were founder members of the Central Lancashire Cricket League (CLL) playing there in the 1892 season. They are the only club, with the exception of Todmorden Cricket Club, to have been members of both the CLL and the Lancashire League where they played in 1893 and 1894.

Despite a long history in the Manchester and District Cricket Association (MDCA) the club had been limited to minor successes with the 2004 lifting of the JC Worthington Trophy by the 2nd XI being the highlight.

However, in the 1990s the club began to develop its junior section which has become one of the largest and most successful in the region. The club's commitment to junior cricket was recognised by the award of the Sport England ClubMark and the Bury Metropolitan Borough Council Community Club of the Year in 2005.

This youth based approach led to more success on the field and, for the first time in their history, the 1st XI won the league in the 2012 season. This was to be Bury's final season in the MDCA as they had applied to, and been accepted as, members of the Bolton & District Cricket Association (BDCA) for the 2013 season.

In 2013, the under 13s won the Cup, beating local rivals Walshaw to pick up the trophy in their debut BDCA season.

In the 2014 season, Bury's 1st XI won their first, and only, BDCA trophy, the knockout Cross Cup, beating Edgworth by 4 wickets.

The club's continued commitment to junior cricket was recognised by its re-accreditation of the Sport England ClubMark in August 2014.

On 25 May 2015 the club informed the BDCA of their intention to resign from the league. When the BDCA confirmed their receipt of the resignation, it was then announced that the club would be applying to join the new GMCL starting in season 2016.

The 3rd XI who had played their cricket in the North Manchester Cricket League (NMCL) also moved into the GMCL after the NMCL voted to join the new league en-bloc.

In 2017, the 1st XI reached the Derek Kay Cup final, losing out to Egerton Cricket Club, in a game played at Greenmount CC.

In 2019, the 3rd XI won the Sunday Premier Cup, defeating Roe Green in the final at Stretford CC. This was the club's first silverware in the GMCL. In 2021, the 2nd XI were Division 4S&W Champions and achieved promotion to Division 3 for 2022. In 2025, the 2nd XI reached the final of the 2nd XI Championship Cup, where they lost out to the hosts, Bolton Indians.

== Greater Manchester League History ==
- 2025 – 1st XI – Division 1 : 11th from 12 (Relgn.)
- 2025 – 2nd XI – Division 6N&W: 9th from 12
- 2025 – 3rd XI – Sunday Division 2N : 5th from 10
- 2024 – 1st XI – Championship : 12th from 12 (Relgn.) (points deduction)
- 2024 – 2nd XI – Division 4N : 12th from 12 (Relgn.) (points deduction)
- 2024 – 3rd XI – Sunday Division 2N : 3rd from 10
- 2022 – 2nd XI – Division 3W : 4th from 12
- 2022 – 1st XI – Premier 2 : 12th from 12 (Relgn.)
- 2022 – 2nd XI – Division 3W : 4th from 12
- 2022 – 3rd XI – Sunday Division 1 : 10th from 10 (Relgn.)
- 2021 – 1st XI – Premier 2 : 4th from 12
- 2021 – 2nd XI – Division 4S&W : 1st from 12 (Promtn.)
- 2021 – 3rd XI – Sunday Premier League : 12th from 12 (Relgn.)
- 2019 – 1st XI – Division 1B : 6th from 12
- 2019 – 2nd XI – Division 2A : 10th from 12
- 2019 – 3rd XI – Sunday Premier League : 8th from 12
- 2018 – 1st XI – Division 1A : 5th from 12
- 2018 – 2nd XI – Division 3 West : 2nd from 12 (Promtn.)
- 2018 – 3rd XI – Sunday Division 1B : 2nd from 10 (Promtn.)
- 2017 – 1st XI – Derek Kay Cup : Finalists (v. Greenmount)
- 2017 – 1st XI – Premier Division : 11th from 12 (Relgn.)
- 2017 – 2nd XI – Division 4 West : 3rd from 12 (Promtn.)
- 2017 – 3rd XI – Sunday Division 1B : 5th from 10
- 2017 – Bury Storm – Archway 20–20 : Quarter Final
- 2016 – 1st XI – Premier Division : 8th from 12
- 2016 – 2nd XI – Division 4 West : 3rd from 12
- 2016 – 3rd XI – Sunday Division North West : 3rd from 12
- 2016 – Bury Storm – Archway 20–20 : Group Stage

== Club President ==
The following people have served as president of Bury Cricket Club:-

- D. Leach; 2023 – 2025
- M.K. Brawn; 2018 – 2022
- G.R. Simpson; 1997 – 2017
- M.K. Brawn; 1996
- D.C. Hindley; 1990 – 1995
- K.J. Brawn; 1985 – 1989
- W.J.B. Roberts; 1983 – 1984
- B.B. Brown; 1981 – 1982
- H.A. Lees; 1979 – 1980
- G.F. Oldroyd; 1972 – 1978
- J.F. Tinline; 1969 – 1971
- J. Fenwick; 1962 – 1968
- E. Roberts; 1958 – 1961
- C.B. Kelly; 1954 – 1957
- R.P. Whipp; 1948 – 1953
- G.B. Horridge; 1946 – 1947
- M.N. Kenyon; 1927 – 1945
- S. Roberts; 1923 – 1926

== Club Chairman ==
The following people have served as chairman of Bury Cricket Club:-

- M. Smith; 2024 – Present
- G. Garner; 2021 – 2024
- M. Smith; 2016 – 2020
- Position Vacant 2015
- M. Smith; 2010 – 2014
- Position Vacant 2007 – 2009
- M.K. Brawn; 2004 – 2006
- J. Coles; 2002 – 2003
- I. Metcalfe; 1999 – 2001
- M.K. Brawn; 1995 – 1998
- D. Leach; 1993 – 1994
- M.K. Brawn; 1992
- D. Leach; 1990 – 1991
- J.D. Ankers; 1986 – 1989
- D. Leach; 1981 – 1985
- K.J. Brawn; 1977 – 1980
- H.A. Lees; 1974 – 1976
- B. Holland; 1971 – 1973
- K.F. Manning; 1967 – 1970
- G.F. Oldroyd; 1965 – 1966
- H. Cunliffe; 1962 – 1964
- G.F. Oldroyd; 1955 – 1961
- E. Roberts; 1950 – 1954
- C.E. Leak; 1945 – 1949
- E. Smith; 1936 – 1944
- J.A. Rostron; 1927 – 1935
- L.N. Fletcher; 1926
- H.W. Morris; 1925
- E. Taylor; 1923 – 1924

== Club Captains ==
The following players have captained Bury Cricket Club:-

- J. Scully; 2026 - Present
- D. Morris; 2025
- A. Breckin; 2024
- D. Morris; 2023
- G. Garner; 2020 – 2022
- J. Wiggans; 2018 – 2019
- K. Belston; 2016 – 2017
- S. Gibson; 2015
- S. Belston; 2008 – 2014
- R. Keen; 2007
- W. Belston; 2005 – 2006
- M.K. Brawn; 2004
- P. Allen; 2003
- S. Dublin; 2002
- I. Thew; 2000 – 2001
- O. Steverson; 1998 – 1999
- N. Kennedy; 1997
- A. Forrest; 1996
- D. Leach; 1994 – 1995
- R.W. Howley; 1993
- P. Allen; 1992
- M.K. Brawn; 1990 – 1991
- D. Leach; 1987 – 1989
- M.K. Brawn; 1986
- J.D. Ankers; 1983 – 1985
- P.A. Reah; 1981 – 1982
- N. Broadhurst; 1976 – 1980
- D. Leach; 1975
- J.A.H. Fielden; 1973 – 1974
- D. Leach; 1971 – 1972
- P.B. Jones; 1970
- B.B. Brown; 1968 – 1969
- B. Holland; 1967
- J.A.H. Fielden; 1964 – 1966
- K.F. Manning; 1961 – 1963
- H. Butterworth; 1960
- K.F. Manning; 1958 – 1959
- H.A. Lees; 1956 – 1957
- H. Cunliffe; 1955
- G.F. Oldroyd; 1952 – 1954
- H. Ashworth; 1949 – 1951
- C.O. Halstead; 1947 – 1948
- S.W. Ramsbottom; 1936 – 1946
- R.P. Whipp; 1935
- G.B. Horridge; 1927 – 1934
- T. Walmsley; 1925 – 1926
- M.N. Kenyon; 1924
- G.B. Horridge; 1923

== Club Honours ==
- 2025 : GMCL : 2nd XI Championship Cup 2nd XI Finalists
- 2021 : GMCL : Division 4S&W 2nd XI Winners
- 2019 : GMCL : Sunday Premier Cup 3rd XI Winners
- 2017 : GMCL : Derek Kay Cup 1st XI Finalists
- 2015 : NMCL : Stanley Hunter Cup (Div. 4) 3rd XI Winners
- 2014 : BDCA : Cross Cup 1st XI Winners
- 2013 : NMCL : Mick Orrell Trophy 3rd XI Division 4 Champions
- 2013 : NMCL : Stanley Hunter Cup (Div. 4) 3rd XI Winners
- 2012 : MDCA : Surridge Trophy 1st XI Winners
- 2012 : MDCA : Stockton Trophy 1st XI League Champions
- 2011 : NMCL : Stanley Hunter Cup (Div. 4) 3rd XI Winners
- 2011 : NMCL : John Greenhalgh Trophy 3rd XI League Division 4 Runners up
- 2010 : MDCA : H.C. Smith Trophy 1st XI Winners
- 2010 : NMCL : Stanley Hunter Cup (Div. 4) 3rd XI Winners
- 2010 : NMCL : John Greenhalgh Trophy 3rd XI League Division 4 Runners-up
- 2010 : MDCA : Surridge Trophy 1st XI Winners
- 2008 : NMCL : Cyril Fletcher Cup (Div. 4) 3rd XI Finalists
- 2008 : MDCA : H.C. Smith Trophy 1st XI Winners
- 2008 : MDCA : Surridge Trophy 1st XI Winners
- 2006 : MDCA : Surridge Trophy 2nd XI Winners
- 2004 : MDCA : J.C. Worthington Cup 2nd XI Winners
- 2003 : NMCL : Alan Gilbert Trophy 3rd XI League Champions
- 2001 : MDCA : Edward Barton Trophy 2nd XI League Champions
- 2001 : MDCA : H.C. Smith Trophy 1st XI Finalists
- 1997 : MDCA : H.C. Smith Trophy 1st XI Finalists
- 1986 : NMCL : Alan Gilbert Trophy 3rd XI League Champions
- 1985 : MDCA : H.C. Smith Trophy 1st XI Finalists
- 1983 : MDCA : J.C. Worthington Cup 2nd XI Finalists
- 1979 : MDCA : H.C. Smith Trophy 1st XI Finalists
- 1976 : MDCA : H.C. Smith Trophy 1st XI Finalists
- 1966 : NMCL : Hodson Cup (Div. 2) 3rd XI Winners
- 1965 : NMCL : Hodson Cup (Div. 2) 3rd XI Finalists

== Overseas Players ==
The following overseas players have represented Bury Cricket Club:-

- 2025 (Australia) Ashton Gumm;
- 2024 (Australia) Riley Vernon;
- 2023 (Cricket West Indies) Kershaski Jno Lewis;
- 2022 (Cricket West Indies) Damario Goodman;
- 2022 (Cricket West Indies) D'Angelo Springer;
- 2019 (Zimbabwe) Milton Shumba;
- 2019 (South Africa) Wicardo Visser;
- 2018 (India) Omar Ahmed Banday;
- 2018 (South Africa) Gustav Nolte;
- 2017 (Sri Lanka) Kasun Vidura Adikari;
- 2017 (Cricket West Indies) Casmond Walters; SVG, Lesser Antilles
- 2016 (Cricket West Indies) Casmond Walters; SVG, Lesser Antilles
- 2016 (Sri Lanka) Malinga Surappulige;
- 2016 (Cricket West Indies) Akil Greenidge; BRB, Lesser Antilles
- 2015 (Sri Lanka) Ashen Silva;
- 2014 (Cricket West Indies) Nekoli Parris; BRB, Lesser Antilles
- 2014 (Australia) Matt Twentyman;
- 2013 (South Africa) Kobus Scholtz;
- 2012 (Sri Lanka) Milinda Siriwardana;
- 2012 (South Africa) Abram Ndhlovu;
- 2012 (New Zealand) Rhys McCarthy;
- 2011 (South Africa) S.J. Erwee;
- 2011 (New Zealand) Rhys McCarthy;
- 2010 (South Africa) Michael Alexander;
- 2010 (Australia) Zack Gowland;
- 2009 (South Africa) Stanton Govender;
- 2008 (Pakistan) Asif Iqbal;
- 2008 (New Zealand) Matt Taylor;
- 2007 (Pakistan) Asif Zakir;
- 2006 (Pakistan) Asif Iqbal;
- 2005 (Pakistan) Asif Iqbal;
- 2004 (England) Nick Kennedy;
- 2003 (Pakistan) Rizwan Saeed;
- 2002 (Cricket West Indies) Steve Dublin; MSR, Leeward Islands
- 2001 (Cricket West Indies) Lesroy Irish; MSR, Leeward Islands
- 2000 (Pakistan) Jamail Nasir;
- 1999 (New Zealand) Owen Steverson;
- 1998 (New Zealand) Owen Steverson;
- 1997 (New Zealand) Owen Steverson;
- 1996 (Cricket West Indies) Delroy Taylor; JAM, Greater Antilles
