= Middleton Cricket Club =

Middleton Cricket Club
League	Lancashire Cricket League
Ground	Towncroft Ave, Middleton, Greater Manchester.
CLL history	1895 - 2015
PL history	2016 - 2017
LL history	2018 -

Middleton Cricket Club, based in Middleton, in the Metropolitan Borough of Rochdale, Greater Manchester are an English Cricket team currently playing in the Lancashire Cricket League. Basil D'Oliveira, Hedley Verity, Roy Gilchrist and Peter Sleep are all past Professionals who have at one time or another played Test Cricket. The only actual amateur from the Club to play Test Cricket was the legendary Fast Bowler Frank Tyson.

Recently they signed James Price as their professional for the upcoming 2020 season. The South African has league cricket experience with Milnrow Cricket Club and Colne Cricket Club and is a right-handed batsmen and right arm seam bowler.

The scoreboard building has the same wind vane design (Father Time replacing the bails) as that of the Marylebone Cricket Club, whose initials are also used by Middleton.

From start of the 2018 season Middleton moved to the Lancashire League.

== Notable players ==
- (England) Basil D'Oliveira
- (England) Hedley Verity
- Roy Gilchrist
- (England) Frank Tyson
- (Australia) Ian Harvey
- (England) Paul Scholes
- (Australia) Peter Sleep
- (England) Richie Wellens
- (England) Will Byers
- (England) Rhys Tierney
