= Milnrow Cricket Club =

Cricket team in Greater Manchester, England

Milnrow Cricket Club, based in Milnrow, an area of the Metropolitan Borough of Rochdale, Greater Manchester, are an English cricket team who as of 2022 play in the Greater Manchester Cricket League (GMCL).

The club is over 150 years old and celebrated its centenary in 1957 with the publication of a club history. The first professional player for the club was James Rigby, in 1884, but the club has never had a great deal of sporting success when compared to its local rivals. It was a founder member of the Central Lancashire League in 1892.

In 2010 the club received a £57,000 grant from the England & Wales Cricket Board. This was towards the costs of providing artificial practice areas for coaching purposes. Earlier in that year it had also received a smaller grant from Sport England. It has also received funding from, for example, the Co-op.

The club has a junior section and has in the past developed players who have been selected for the Academy of Lancashire Cricket Club, which exists to further develop young talent with the aim of seeing its members become professional players.

For the 2018 and 2019 seasons Milnrow played in the Lancashire League.

== Past professionals ==
Despite its modest record in the league, Milnrow has attracted some top Test players and former county cricket players as its professionals. Former players for the team include the Australian all-rounder George Tribe, the county spinners Dusty Rhodes and John McMahon, former Lancashire captain Ken Grieves, the West Indies Test player Derick Parry, the Zimbabwean Kevin Curran and the Indian bowler Chetan Sharma. Its most recent Test player to act as a professional was Paul Wiseman, the New Zealand off-spin bowler in 2005.

The record wicket-taker in a single season was Tribe, whose 148 wickets in 1949 were a record at the time for the Central Lancashire League (equalled in the same season by George Pope, who took 148 for Heywood and later beaten by Dattu Phadkar with 154 for Rochdale in 1955); the historian of the Leagues, John Kay, wrote that Tribe "suffered badly from indifferent fielding" at Milnrow.
