= Central Lancashire Cricket League =

Cricket league in northern England

The Central Lancashire Cricket League (CLCL) was a fifteen team cricket league, traditionally based in Lancashire and the West Riding of Yorkshire. It was then based in Greater Manchester and West Yorkshire. The league ran competitions at First Team, Second Team, Third Team, Under 18, Under 15, Under 13 and Under 11 levels.

The league was due to expand to a sixteen club format in 2005. Monton & Weaste were awarded the extra place ahead of Bamford Fieldhouse, Saddleworth, Elton, Walshaw, Didsbury and Bury. However, Stand left the league before the 2005 season and their replacement, Clifton did not join until 2006. That latter year also saw the introduction of a Twenty20 competition in the league, which was first won by Norden.

2015 was the final season for the league. Many of its clubs opting to join the new Greater Manchester Cricket League which started in 2016, CLCL merged with the Saddleworth League to form the Pennine League. The Pennine League failed after only two seasons, blamed by the league secretary on the expansion plans of the Lancashire League It was announced early in the 2017 season that Norden, Walsden, Littleborough, Rochdale and Middleton would all move to the Lancashire League.

== Member clubs ==
Club	Membership		
Club	From	To	Rejoined
Ashton	1928		
Bury	1892	1893	
Castleton Moor	1916	1987	
Clifton	2006		
Crompton	1896		
Darwen	1893	1896	
Dukinfield	1901	1916	
Glossop	1901	1916	
Heywood	1892		
Hyde	1981	1992	
Littleborough	1892		
Longsight	1907	1908	
Middleton	1895		
Milnrow	1892		
Monton & Weaste	2005		
Moorside	1901	1928	
Norden	1981		
Oldham	1892	1893	1900
Radcliffe	1892	1897	1937
Rochdale	1893		
Royton	1892		
Stalybridge	1898	1916	
Stand	1993	2004	
Stockport	1937	1998	
Todmorden	1892	1897	
Unsworth	1989		
Walsden	1892		
Werneth	1910		

== Honours ==
Year	First Division	Wood Cup	Second Division	Burton Cup	Aggregate Cup	Twenty20 Cup
1892	Littleborough					
1893	Rochdale					
1894	Rochdale					
1895	Rochdale					
1896	Todmorden					
1897	Rochdale					
1898	Middleton		Walsden			
1899	Middleton		Rochdale			
1900	Rochdale		Milnrow			
1901	Glossop		Rochdale			
1902	Crompton		Oldham			
1903	Glossop		Rochdale			
1904	Heywood		Rochdale			
1905	Rochdale		Rochdale			
1906	Rochdale		Rochdale			
1907	Moorside		Rochdale			
1908	Glossop		Middleton			
1909	Oldham		Middleton			
1910	Milnrow		Littleborough			
1911	Littleborough		Crompton			
1912	Littleborough		Milnrow			
1913	Glossop		Dukinfield			
1914	Royton		Dukinfield			
1915	Moorside		Walsden			
1916	Oldham					
1917	Littleborough					
1918	Crompton					
1919	Littleborough		Crompton			
1920	Middleton		Littleborough			
1921	Littleborough	Middleton	Middleton			
1922	Rochdale	Rochdale	Milnrow			
1923	Rochdale	Rochdale	Rochdale			
1924	Rochdale	Rochdale	Werneth			
1925	Rochdale	Werneth	Castleton Moor			
1926	Castleton Moor	Werneth	Middleton			
1927	Rochdale	Werneth	Crompton			
1928	Castleton Moor	Castleton Moor	Littleborough			
1929	Heywood	Heywood			Heywood	
1930	Middleton	Middleton	Oldham		Middleton	
1931	Heywood	Middleton	Castleton Moor		Heywood	
1932	Littleborough	Rochdale	Rochdale		Littleborough	
1933	Ashton	Middleton	Middleton		Middleton	
1934	Littleborough	Werneth	Royton		Werneth	
1935	Littleborough	Littleborough	Middleton		Littleborough	
1936	Littleborough	Middleton	Littleborough		Littleborough	
1937	Radcliffe	Werneth	Stockport		Radcliffe	
1938	Middleton	Middleton	Stockport		Stockport	
1939	Werneth	Milnrow	Werneth		Werneth	
1940	Ashton	Ashton	Ashton		Ashton	
1941	Stockport	Littleborough	Stockport		Stockport	
1942	Stockport	Littleborough	Stockport		Stockport	
1943	Castleton Moor	Oldham	Stockport		Stockport	
1944	Radcliffe	Werneth	Stockport / Oldham*		Werneth	
1945	Heywood	Heywood	Heywood		Heywood	
1946	Radcliffe	Milnrow	Werneth			
1947	Milnrow	Milnrow	Stockport		Milnrow	
1948	Rochdale	Middleton	Stockport		Rochdale	
1949	Stockport / Milnrow*	Milnrow	Stockport		Stockport	
1950	Rochdale	Ashton	Middleton		Rochdale	
1951	Rochdale	Werneth	Stockport		Rochdale	
1952	Rochdale	Rochdale			Middleton	
1953	Rochdale	Rochdale	Royton		Rochdale	
1954	Crompton	Walsden	Castleton Moor			
1955	Rochdale	Rochdale	Middleton		Middleton / Rochdale*	
1956	Rochdale	Rochdale	Rochdale		Rochdale	
1957	Oldham	Rochdale	Royton		Rochdale / Royton*	
1958	Middleton	Rochdale	Middleton		Middleton	
1959	Middleton	Werneth	Middleton		Middleton	
1960	Heywood	Milnrow	Middleton		Middleton	
1961	Radcliffe	Radcliffe	Werneth		Heywood	
1962	Stockport / Walsden*	Walsden	Middleton		Middleton	
1963	Heywood	Stockport	Stockport		Stockport	
1964	Walsden	Ashton	Ashton		Ashton	
1965	Stockport / Crompton*	Ashton	Milnrow		Stockport	
1966	Stockport	Stockport	Stockport		Stockport	
1967	Heywood	Middleton	Heywood		Heywood	
1968	Heywood	Radcliffe	Werneth		Werneth	
1969	Radcliffe	Stockport	Stockport		Stockport	
1970	Middleton	Heywood			Heywood	
1971	Radcliffe	Heywood	Stockport	Stockport	Stockport	
1972	Milnrow	Castleton Moor	Castleton Moor	Royton	Milnrow	
1973	Middleton	Littleborough	Littleborough	Royton / Middleton*	Middleton	
1974	Heywood	Littleborough	Castleton Moor	Castleton Moor	Castleton Moor	
1975	Milnrow	Walsden	Werneth	Milnrow	Milnrow	
1976	Heywood	Littleborough	Werneth	Oldham	Heywood	
1977	Littleborough	Middleton	Middleton	Middleton	Littleborough	
1978	Littleborough	Milnrow	Radcliffe	Werneth	Werneth	
1979	Oldham	Oldham	Werneth	Royton	Werneth	
1980	Royton	Crompton	Milnrow	Middleton	Middleton	
1981	Hyde	Werneth	Werneth	Milnrow	Middleton	
1982	Oldham	Littleborough	Werneth	Middleton	Oldham	
1983	Littleborough	Oldham	Oldham	Milnrow	Oldham	
1984	Heywood	Heywood	Middleton	Heywood	Heywood	
1985	Littleborough	Oldham	Oldham	Littleborough	Littleborough	
1986	Littleborough	Littleborough	Oldham	Middleton	Oldham	
1987	Norden	Milnrow	Middleton	Middleton	Norden	
1988	Middleton	Oldham	Littleborough	Rochdale	Littleborough	
1989	Stockport	Milnrow	Littleborough	Rochdale	Littleborough	
1990	Rochdale	Werneth	Middleton	Littleborough	Littleborough	
1991	Rochdale	Rochdale	Littleborough	Middleton	Rochdale	
1992	Littleborough	Littleborough	Milnrow	Milnrow	Littleborough	
1993	Rochdale	Heywood	Radcliffe	Norden	Middleton	
1994	Radcliffe	Littleborough	Middleton	Milnrow	Rochdale	
1995	Rochdale	Walsden	Middleton	Stockport	Middleton	
1996	Littleborough	Milnrow	Radcliffe	Heywood	Littleborough	
1997	Rochdale	Littleborough	Middleton	Milnrow	Middleton	
1998	Littleborough	Littleborough	Milnrow	Rochdale	Littleborough	
1999	Rochdale	Littleborough	Rochdale	Rochdale	Rochdale	
2000	Middleton	Rochdale	Rochdale	Milnrow	Middleton	
2001	Rochdale	Middleton	Middleton	Milnrow	Middleton	
2002	Littleborough	Norden	Norden	Littleborough	Littleborough	
2003	Rochdale	Heywood	Walsden	Littleborough	Rochdale	
2004	Norden	Walsden	Rochdale	Littleborough	Littleborough	
2005	Littleborough	Heywood	Littleborough	Littleborough	Littleborough	
2006	Heywood	Heywood	Walsden	Littleborough		Norden
2007	Rochdale	Heywood		Littleborough		Norden
2008	Heywood	Monton and Weaste	Middleton	Monton and Weaste	Walsden	
2009	Monton and Weaste	Monton and Weaste	Rochdale	Clifton	Middleton	
2010	Norden	Milnrow	Rochdale	Milnrow	Norden	
2011	Norden	Middleton	Middleton	Littleborough	Norden	
2012	Walsden	Middleton	Norden	Middleton	Walsden	
2013	Walsden	Heywood	Walsden	Heywood	Walsden	
2014	Norden	Norden	Norden	Norden	Norden	

* The title was shared in these years.

== See also ==
- Club cricket
- List of English cricket clubs
