= Believe (2013 film) =

2013 film directed by David Scheinmann

- Theatrical release poster
- Directed by: David Scheinmann
- Screenplay by: Carmelo Pennisi, Massimiliano Durante and David Scheinmann
- Story by: Carmelo Pennisi and Massimiliano Durante
- Produced by: Manuela Noble; Justin Peyton; Ben Timlett
- Starring: Brian Cox; Jack Smith; Natascha McElhone; Anne Reid; Philip Jackson; Toby Stephens
- Music by: Christian Henson
- Release dates: 28 September 2013 (Zurich Film Festival); 25 July 2014 (United Kingdom)
- Running time: 92 minutes
- Country: United Kingdom
- Language: English
- Budget: $6 million/£4.7 million

Believe is a 2013 British sports drama film directed by David Scheinmann. Set in Manchester in 1984 and based on true events, it stars Brian Cox as Scottish football manager Matt Busby, who comes out of retirement to coach a team of young working-class boys captained by the talented but unruly Georgie Gallagher (played by Jack Smith). The film also stars Natascha McElhone as Erica Gallagher, Anne Reid as Jean Busby, and Toby Stephens as Georgie's prospective headmaster.

Believe was released theatrically in the United Kingdom on 25 July 2014.

== Plot ==
In 1984 Salford, Georgie Gallagher lives with his widowed mother, Erica (Natascha McElhone). His passion for football is challenged by Erica's desire to have Georgie attend the prestigious, rugby-playing Lancashire Grammar School For Boys, run by the strict and scholarly Dr Farquar (Toby Stephens). Georgie is up for a scholarship at the prestigious school pending on his passing of the entrance exam.

While attending an open day at the school, Georgie sees a leaflet for a regional Manchester Junior Football Cup tournament. Determined to enter and beat the team of school bullies, Georgie snatches a wallet from a stranger in the hopes of getting the £20 entrance fee. The stranger happens to be an elderly Matt Busby (Brian Cox) and after tracking him down along with the help of his friend Bob (Philip Jackson), the pair learn that Georgie is an unusually talented footballer. Matt and Georgie reach an agreement whereby Matt will coach Georgie's football team in exchange for silence over his theft.

Still needing the money to enter the football tournament, Georgie attempts to break into Dr Farquar's house in order to steal back the tuition fee that Erica had been paying to ensure Georgie passes his entrance exam to the grammar school. He is caught and arrested, and banned from playing football as punishment.

The team finds an article in the paper about Busby and realises that their coach is the famous manager of the legendary Manchester United team. Feeling betrayed by his team and Busby for not revealing his true identity before, Georgie quits the team and refuses to play in the final. Georgie is deeply hurt, feeling that all adults undoubtedly end up lying to him.

On the day of Busby's 75th birthday, the team gears up to play the final, while Georgie takes his exam with hopes of passing and receiving his scholarship. Georgie urges Erica to attend the final to cheer on the team. Without their leader, the team is down by 2 goals. In a moment of grace, Dr. Farquar interrupts the game with his beloved brass band, while Erica rushes to get Georgie to play the second half of the match. Georgie confides in his mother and says he wants to win the cup in honour of his late father. In the final moments of the game Georgie scores with a direct free kick to win the cup.

== Cast ==
- Jack Smith as Georgie Gallagher
- Brian Cox as Matt Busby
- Natascha McElhone as Erica Gallagher
- Anne Reid as Jean Busby
- Philip Jackson as Bob
- Kate Ashfield as Helen
- James Callis as Man in Mac
- Toby Stephens as Dr. Farquar

== Filming ==
Filming began in September 2011 and took place at various locations around Greater Manchester; many key scenes were shot at the Stockport Cricket Club.

== Reception ==
The film has an approval rating of 30% on Rotten Tomatoes from ten critic reviews. On Metacritic, the film has a weighted average score of 39 out of 100 based on six critics, indicating "generally unfavorable" reviews.

The Guardian gave the film two stars out of five, writing: "Just when we thought Man United's stock couldn't fall any lower, here's an often cringeworthy 'inspired by true events' supposition that sees the retired Matt Busby (Brian Cox) coaching the blond moppet who stole his wallet to under-12s glory. Early 80s pointers (Musical Youth, the miners' strike) are trowelled on to a formulaic plot: the school's cup final coincides with not just a major exam but Busby's birthday to boot. Cox's guardedly avuncular turn might have sustained a more rigorous endeavour, but the attempt to evoke the trauma of the Munich air disaster is rendered wholly insupportable by the trifling hooey around it".

== See also ==
- Bend It Like Beckham
- Early Man
