= Irvine Boocock =

English footballer

Personal information
- Full name: Irvine Boocock
- Date of birth: 27 February 1890
- Place of birth: Cleckheaton, England
- Date of death: 17 November 1941 (aged 51)
- Place of death: Heckmondwike, England
- Height: 5 ft 7 in (1.70 m)
- Position: Left back

Senior career*
Years	Team	Apps	(Gls)
–1910	Sunfield Rovers		
1910–1922	Bradford City	169	(1)
1922–1923	Darlington	13	(0)
Total		182	(1)

International career
1914	Football League XI	3	(0)
- * Club domestic league appearances and goals

Irvine Boocock (27 February 1890 – 17 November 1941) was an English professional footballer who made over 160 appearances in the Football League for Bradford City as a left back. He represented the Football League XI.

== Sporting career ==
Born in Cleckheaton, Boocock began his football career with non-League club Sunfield Rovers, before joining First Division club Bradford City in March 1910. Either side of the First World War, Boocock made 184 appearances and scored one goal for the Bantams. He finished his career with a short spell at Third Division North club Darlington, whom he joined in June 1922.

Boocock also played cricket for hometown club Cleckheaton between 1909 and 1932 and later served the club as groundsman and bar steward. He also played for Moorend and Eccleshill.

== Personal life ==
Boocock served as a corporal in the West Yorkshire Regiment during the First World War. He served in five different battalions, including the Leeds Rifles and a Bradford Pals battalion. He fell off a bicycle in 1941 and died of his injuries.

== Career statistics ==
Appearances and goals by club, season and competition
Club	Season	League			FA Cup		Total	
Club	Season	Division	Apps	Goals	Apps	Goals	Apps	Goals
Bradford City	1914–15	First Division	30	0	5	0	35	0
Bradford City	Total		169	1	15	0	184	1
Darlington	1922–23	Third Division North	13	0	2	0	15	0
Career total			182	1	17	0	199	1
