= Bocock =

Bocock is a surname of English origin. At the time of the British Census of 1881, its frequency was highest in Lincolnshire (16.1 times the British average), followed by Cambridgeshire, Suffolk, Nottinghamshire, Northumberland, Yorkshire, Lancashire, Northamptonshire and Essex. In all other British counties its frequency was below national average. The name Bocock may refer to:

- Branch Bocock (1884–1946), head football coach for the University of Georgia
- Brian Bocock (born 1985), Major League Baseball shortstop
- Elizabeth Azcona Bocock (born 1969), Honduran politician
- Elisabeth Scott Bocock (1901–1985), American patron of arts
- José Azcona Bocock (born 1972), Hondoran politician
- Peter Bocock (born 1991), New Zealand cricketer
- Thomas S. Bocock (1815–1891), politician and lawyer
- Willis Henry Bocock (1865–1947), professor at the University of Georgia
- Willis Perry Bocock (1807–1887), American politician

== See also ==
- Bocock Peak
