= Fasal Shahid =

English cricketer (born 1986)

Personal information
- Full name: Fasal Hassan Shahid
- Born: 4 March 1986 (age 40) smethwick Warwickshire, England
- Batting: Right-handed
- Bowling: Right-arm medium
- Relatives: Zain Shaid

Domestic team information
- Years: Team
- 2009–present: Herefordshire
- 2008: Marylebone Cricket Club

Career statistics
Competition	List A
Matches	1
Runs scored	138
Batting average	2.00
100s/50s	–/–
Top score	2
Balls bowled	42
Wickets	5
Bowling average	33.00
5 wickets in innings	–
10 wickets in match	–
Best bowling	1/33
Catches/stumpings	–/–
- Source: Cricinfo, 11 May 2011

Fasal Hassan Shahid (born 4 March 1986) is an English cricketer. Shahid is a right-handed batsman who bowls right-arm medium pace. He was born in Birmingham, Warwickshire.

Shahid made his only List A appearance for the Marylebone Cricket Club against Bangladesh A. In this match he took a single wicket, that of Shakib Al Hasan, for the cost of 33 runs from 7 overs. With the bat he scored 2 runs before being dismissed LBW by Rubel Hossain. He made his debut for Herefordshire in the 2009 MCCA Knockout Trophy against Wiltshire. Shahid currently plays Minor counties cricket for Herefordshire.

He has previously played Second XI cricket for the Worcestershire Second XI.
