= Stockport Cricket Club =

Stockport Cricket Club is a cricket club in Stockport, England, whose first and second teams play in the Cheshire Cricket League.

== Ground ==
Stockport Cricket Club was formed in 1855, and has had 2 previous grounds before moving to Cale Green in 1883. These were on Charles Street, Higher Hillgate and on Greek Street. The Cale Green Ground was donated, along with the adjacent Cale Green Park, by Henry Bell, the former Mayor of Stockport. The cricket ground is one of the largest in the borough at 135 yards wide and 130 yards long, and the site also accommodates a lacrosse pitch, two bowling greens, the pavilion and a war memorial.

== History ==
Stockport Cricket Club was a member of the Manchester Cricket Association until 1937, when the club joined the Central Lancashire League. During this time the club had a number of periods of success, notably the 1960s, when 12 trophies were won by the clubs first and second XI. While in the CLL the club had a number of well known players, with the most recognisable name being Vinoo Mankad, the Indian all-rounder. Future county cricketers including Barry Dudleston also played at the club in this period. Financial difficulties forced the club to resign from the CLL in 1998, and the club merged with Stockport Sunday School and took their place in the Derbyshire and Cheshire Cricket League. The club experienced much success in this league and both the seniors and juniors, with the club winning a league competition every season and individual players collecting numerous personal awards. The junior sides were particularly strong, especially at Under 17 level where the club had a 6 season spell unbeaten in their league division, starting in 2001 and finally ending in 2007. The club resigned from the DCCL at the end of the 2007 season, and entered into the Cheshire pyramid for the start of the 2008 season. The ground was used for shooting many scenes of play for the 2014 film Believe.

== Cenotaph ==
The war memorial at the corner of the cricket field is dedicated to the memory of the 18 members who died in World Wars I and II, and has the following inscriptions:-

AND THESE MEN DIED LEAVING THEIR DEATH FOR AN EXAMPLE OF A NOBLE COURAGE AND A MEMORIAL OF VIRTUE UNTO ALL THE NATION

II Macabees 6

SONS OF THIS PLACE LET THIS OF YOU BE SAID

THAT YOU WHO LIVE ARE WORTHY OF YOUR DEAD

THESE GAVE THEIR LIVES THAT YOU WHO LIVE MAY REAP

A RICHER HARVEST ERE YOU FALL ASLEEP

Rev T E Royde

THERE'S BUT ONE TASK FOR ALL FOR EACH ONE LIFE TO GIVE WHO STANDS, IF FREEDOM FALL WHO DIES, IF ENGLAND LIVE

Rudyard Kipling
