= Rochdale Cricket Club =

English cricket team from Rochdale, Greater Manchester

Rochdale Cricket Club are an English cricket team from Rochdale, Greater Manchester, currently playing in the Lancashire League. Until 2015 they played in the Central Lancashire League, being one of the oldest - and most successful - of all the CLL teams. They joined the CLL in 1893, the league having been founded a year earlier under the title of the South East Lancashire league. Rochdale won the league title a record 28 times, the last occasion being in 2007. They also won the Wood Cup - a knockout competition - 13 times, equalling Littleborough.

From start of the 2018 season Rochdale moved to the Lancashire League.

== Notable players ==
Famous players to have played cricket for Rochdale included Cecil Parkin, who was the club's professional in 1921 when he was selected to play for England in The Ashes Test against the Australians; when Parkin was picked for England, Rochdale recruited another England Test player, Patsy Hendren, to play instead for a single match against Heywood. Other notable professionals include England bowler Sydney Barnes, West Indian cricketer (and politician) Learie Constantine and professional footballer Craig Dawson.
