= Paul Christie (cricketer) =

English cricketer

Personal information
- Full name: Paul Christie
- Born: 9 February 1971 (age 55); Sunderland, County Durham, England
- Batting: Right-handed
- Bowling: Left-arm medium-fast

Domestic team information
- Years: Team
- 1991: Durham
- 1989: Marylebone Cricket Club

Career statistics
Competition	First-class
Matches	1
Runs scored	0
Batting average	0.00
100s/50s	–/–
Top score	0
Balls bowled	162
Wickets	3
Bowling average	40.00
5 wickets in innings	–
10 wickets in match	–
Best bowling	3/57
Catches/stumpings	–/–
- Source: Cricinfo, 7 September 2011

Paul Christie (born 9 February 1971 in Sunderland, County Durham) is a former English cricketer. Christie was a right-handed batsman who bowled left-arm medium-fast.

Christie made a single first-class appearance for the Marylebone Cricket Club against M Parkinson's World XI at the North Marine Road Ground, Scarborough. In this match, he bowled 13 wicket-less overs for the cost of 63 runs in the World XIs first-innings, while in their second-innings he took 3 wickets for the cost of 57 runs from 14 overs. In the Marylebone Cricket Club's first-innings he didn't bat, while in their second he was dismissed for a duck by Wasim Akram. M Parkinson's World XI won the match by 257 runs.

In 1991, Christie made a single Minor Counties Championship for Durham against Hertfordshire. With Durham being elevated to first-class status for the 1992 season, his services were not retained by the county.
