= Mark Boocock =

English cricketer

Personal information
- Full name: Mark Graham Boocock
- Born: 11 June 1963 (age 63); Leeds, Yorkshire, England
- Batting: Right-handed
- Bowling: Leg break

Domestic team information
- Years: Team
- 1999/00: Marylebone Cricket Club
- 1987–1991: Cheshire

Career statistics
Competition	First-class
Matches	1
Runs scored	–
Batting average	–
100s/50s	–/–
Top score	–
Balls bowled	114
Wickets	0
Bowling average	–
5 wickets in innings	0
10 wickets in match	0
Best bowling	–
Catches/stumpings	–/–
- Source: Cricinfo, 28 September 2018

Mark Graham Boocock (born 11 June 1963) is a former English first-class cricketer.

Born at Leeds, Boocock played minor counties cricket for Cheshire from 1987 to 1991, making 24 appearances in the Minor Counties Championship. Cheshire were permitted to play List A matches in the NatWest Trophy during this time, but Boocock did not feature in any of Cheshire's one-day List A matches. After playing for Cheshire, Boocock continued to feature in club cricket, and was selected to tour Bangladesh with the Marylebone Cricket Club in January 2000, playing in three fixtures during the tour, including one first-class match against Bangladesh. Boocock did not bat during the match, but did bowl a total of 19 overs of leg break, going wicket-less. This match marked his only appearance in first-class cricket.
