= Manchester and District Cricket Association =

Manchester and District Cricket Association (MDCA) was an English cricket association which contained 17 teams spread around the Greater Manchester area. Founded in 1892, it supported two leagues for teams playing First XI cricket, two for Second XI cricket and a single league for Third XI teams; not all teams have a Third XI, which accounts for this difference. It was wound up after the 2013 season.

== Club sides ==
  - Bolton Indians
  - Brooksbottom
  - Bolton
  - Burnage
  - Bury (left after 2013 season)
  - Friends Sporting Club
  - Deane & Derby
  - Euxton
  - Hindley St. Peter's
  - Lostock
  - Newton Heath
  - South West Manchester
  - Stretford
  - Swinton Moorside
  - Westleigh
  - Whalley Range
  - Winton
  - Worsley
  - Wythenshawe

These sides only compete in the 3rd team division and are feature their stronger sides in a different association.

  - Astley & Tyldesley
  - Flixton
  - Heywood
  - Stand

== League structure ==
=== First XI ===
- Premier League
  - Bury
  - Deane & Derby
  - Hindley St. Peter's
  - South West Manchester
  - Stretford
  - Swinton Moorside
  - Whalley Range
  - Winton
  - Worsley
  - Wythenshawe
- Division One
  - Bolton Indians
  - Brooksbottom
  - Bolton
  - Euxton
  - Lostock
  - Newton Heath
  - Westleigh

=== Second XI ===
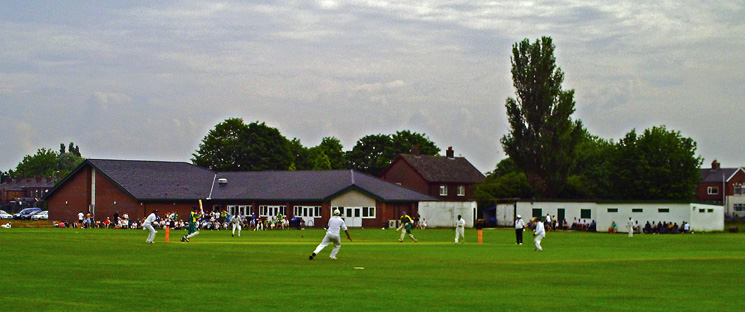
MDCA 2nd XI match in progress between Hindley St. Peter's and Deane & Derby at Hindley.

- Division 2A
  - Bury
  - Deane & Derby
  - Euxton
  - Hindley St. Peter's
  - South West Manchester
  - Stretford
  - Swinton Moorside
  - Winton
  - Worsley
  - Wythenshawe
- Division 2B
  - Bolton Indians
  - Brooksbottom
  - Bolton
  - Lostock
  - Newton Heath
  - Westleigh
  - Whalley Range

=== Third XI ===
- Division 3
  - Brooksbottom
  - Deane & Derby
  - Heywood
  - South West Manchester (3rd)
  - South West Manchester (4th)
  - Stretford
  - Swinton Moorside
  - Whalley Range
  - Winton
  - Worsley
  - Wythenshawe

== See also ==
- Club cricket
- List of English cricket clubs
