= Ian Wrigglesworth (cricketer) =

Australian cricketer (born 1967)

Personal information
- Born: 29 November 1967 (age 58); Melbourne, Australia

Domestic team information
- Years: Team
- 1994-1995: Victoria
- Source: Cricinfo, 10 December 2015

Ian Wrigglesworth (born 29 November 1967) is an Australian former cricketer. He played five first-class cricket matches for Victoria between 1994 and 1995.

== See also ==
- List of Victoria first-class cricketers
