= Stand Cricket Club =

The Stand Cricket Club (Stand CC) was established in 1853. The clubs first original ground was sited off Ringley Road to the left of the fourth fairway at Stand Golf Club.The club's present ground is situated between Hamilton Road and Higher Lane in Whitefield, Bury, Greater Manchester. The club were founder members of the North Western Cricket league, which became the Lancashire and Cheshire Cricket League. In 1992 they became a member of the Central Lancashire League. Between 1993 and 2004, Stand CC had limited success (highest position 4th 1995 and qualifying for the ECB Lancashire cup reaching QF), but in 2005, they moved into the Lancashire County League (LCL) for the 2005 season. Since joining the LCL the club have won the Walkden Cup (2008), the Hulme Trophy (2009), the 2nd XI Last Six Competition (2010) and the 3rd XI League, and the Bryden Trophy (2006, 2007, 2008). The Stand Cricket Club were founder members of the Greater Manchester Cricket League in 2016, winning the Second Division as champions and the First Division Title in 2018.

In the 2019 season, the club ran three senior teams and five junior teams (U9s, U11s, U13s, U15s, and U18s).

First Class players have included Warren Hegg of Lancashire County Cricket Club and England, Norman McVicker of Warwickshire Cricket Club, Leicestershire Cricket Club, Ken Grieves Lancashire Cricket Clubhttps://en.wikipedia.org/wiki/Ken_Grieves and Hugh Milling of Ireland. Michael J Warden Played for the MCC and Australian County XI v West Indies

== Club honours list ==
=== 1XI ===
- 1926 Lancashire and Cheshire Champions
- 1941 Lancashire and Cheshire Champions
- 1951 Lancashire and Cheshire Champions
- 1961 Lancashire and Cheshire Champions and Walkden cup winners Saville Whittle Shield winners
- 1962 Walken Cup Winners
- 1986 Lancashire and Cheshire Division Two Runners Up
- 1988 Hough Shield Winners
- 1989 Hough Shield Runners Up
- 2008 Walkden Cup Winners
- MOM S Catterall
- 2016 Greater Manchester Cricket League Division Two Champions
- 2018 Greater Manchester Cricket League Division One Champions
- 2023 T20 winners
- 2024 Championship Champions

=== 2XI ===
- 1977 Hulme cup winners
- 1985 Lancs and Cheshire 1st Division Champions
- 1985 Hulme cup runners Up
- 1988 Lancs and Cheshire 2nd Division Champions
- 2009 Hulme Trophy Winners
- MOM D. Foreman
- 2009 LCL Sportsman's Trophy
- 2010 LCL Last Six Competition Winners
- 2016 GMCL 4th Division Promotion
- 2019 GMCL 3rd Division Promotion

=== 3XI ===
- 1982 North Manchester 3rd Division Winners Stokes Cup winners
- 1983 Hodgson Cup Runners up
- 1990 North Manchester 2nd Division Runners Up
- 1991 Hodson Cup Winners MOM B. McVicker
- 1999 North Manchester 3rd Division Runners Up
- 2002 Stokes Cup Runners Up
- 2003 CLL Division and Cup winners
- 2006 LCC Division winners
- 2007 LCC Division winners
- 2008 LCC Division winners
- 2019 GMCL Division C winners

=== U18s ===
1976 Division & Greenhaugh Cup winners

- 1978 Greenhaugh Cup Runners up
- 1979 Division Runners up
- 1980 Greenhaulgh Cup winners
- 1981 Greenhaulgh Cup Winners

MOM R Moglia 100*

- 1984 Division & Greenhalgh Cup Winners
- 2007 Greenhaugh Cup Winners

=== Other awards ===
- 2009 LCL Sportsmanship Trophy

== Professionals and Overseas Amateurs ==
=== Professionals ===
- 1981 Jim Kenyon (Eng)
- 1982 Jim Kenyon (Eng)
- 1983 Jim Kenyon (Eng)
- 1984 Jim Kenyon (Eng)
- 1985 Steve Burnage (Eng)
- 1986 Dave(Percy)Parsons (Eng)
- 1987 Dave(Percy)Parsons (Eng)
- 1988 Dave(Percy)Parsons (Eng)
- 1989 Franny Daly (Eng)
- 1990 Franny Daly (Eng)
- 1991 Dave Townley (Aus)
- 1992 Andy Williams (Eng)
- 1993 Michael J Warden (Aus)
- 1994 Michael J Warden (Aus)
- 1995 Michael J Warden (Aus)
- 1996 Michael J Warden (Aus)
- 1997 Michael J Warden (Aus)
- 1998 Michael J Warden (Aus)
- 1999 Sampath (SL)
- 2000 Brad Flegg (SA)
- 2001 Brad Flegg (SA)
- 2002 Martin Hegg (Eng)
- 2003 Martin Hegg (Eng)
- 2004 John Seedle (Eng)
- 2005 John Seedle (Eng)
- 2006 Trent Scott (Aus)
- 2007 Trent Scott (Aus)
- 2008 Naranjan Kumara (SL)
- 2009 Amila Wethhassinghe (SL)
- 2010 Amila Weththasinghe (SL)
- 2011 James Cutt (Eng)
- 2012 No Professional
- 2013 No Professional
- 2014 No Professional
- 2015 Chandi Kumara (Pak)
- 2016 Ali Azmat (Pak)
- 2017 Ali Azmat (Pak)
- 2018 Geshan Wimaladharma (SL)
- 2019 N. Nawella (SL)
- 2020 Chris Williams (Eng)
- 2021 Chris Williams. (Eng)
- 2022 Chris Williams (Eng)
- 2023 Chris Williams (Eng)
- 2024. M.Majeed (Pak)
- 2025. M.Majeed (Pak)
- 2026 No Professional
- 2027

=== Overseas Amateurs ===
- 1984 Dave Townley (Aus)
- 1993 Geoff Nelson (Aus)
- 1994 Dean Temple (Aus)
- 1995 Dean Temple (Aus)
- 2001 Josh McClean (Aus)
- 2012 Brett Ernst (Aus)
- 2014 Brett Ernst (Aus)
- 2018 J. Sukhon (NZ)
- 2019 J. Sukhon (NZ)
- 2022 D.Faram. (Aus)
- 2023. D.Faram. (Aus)
- 2024. D.Faram. (Aus)
- 2025. J.Pegg. (Aus)
- 2026. J.Pegg. (Aus)

Dean Temple broke and held the amateur batting record for the number of runs scored in the 1995 season(CLL) Michael J Warden took over 600 wickets

Representative Cricketers

Phillip Ramsbottom Lancashire CCC over 50s. Stuart Catterall Lancashire CCC over 50s. David Taylor. CCL Under 18s. David Foreman. CCL league team. Paul MacGladdery. CCL league team. Carl Sutcliffe. LCL league team, Nick Gore Central Lancs League U19 Team, Lancashire U19's

Sampath Sri Lanka A Josh McClean South Australia Dave Parsons Cumbria Chris Williams Cumbria

https://cricketarchive.com/Queensland/Players/17/17809/Miscellaneous_Matches.html
