= Martin Robinson (cricketer) =

English cricketer (born 1962)

Personal information
- Full name: Martin John Robinson
- Born: 12 September 1962 (age 64); Tholthorpe, Yorkshire, England
- Batting: Left-handed
- Bowling: Right-arm fast-medium

Domestic team information
- Years: Team
- 1988–1989: Marylebone Cricket Club

Career statistics
Competition	First-class
Matches	2
Runs scored	20
Batting average	19
100s/50s	0/0
Top score	6.66
Catches/stumpings	0/–
- Source: Cricinfo, 20 December 2018

Martin John Robinson (born 12 September 1962) is a former English first-class cricketer.

Born at Tholthorpe, Robinson played second XI cricket for Gloucestershire and Leicestershire in the mid-1980s, but was unable to force his way into either county's first XI. He would go onto play first-class cricket for the Marylebone Cricket Club, debuting in 1988 against M Parkinson's World XI at Scarborough. He played again in the same fixture the following year. Robinson scored a total of 20 runs in his two first-class appearances. He later played second XI cricket for Durham, but again was unable to force his way into their starting XI.
