= Heywood Cricket Club =

English cricket team

Heywood Cricket Club, based in Heywood, Greater Manchester, are an English cricket team that plays in the Central Lancashire Cricket League. They were founded around 1879. Currently the team also carries the name of Biwater's, a locally based company who sponsor the team.

== Ground ==
Heywood play their home matches at the Crimble ground on the outskirts of the town's park known as Queens Park. They have played here since 1921. The pitch at Crimble is said to be one of the largest pitches in Lancashire, second only to Old Trafford.

== Competition ==
The club were founder members of the Central Lancashire League in 1892 and have remained in this league throughout its history. Though the club have been in existence since before this with captain's records going back to 1879. They have had varied success throughout the years, beginning with their first league title in 1904. Their most recent league title being in 2008.

Heywood enter teams into the first 11, 2nd 11, 3rd 11, under 18's, under 15's and under 13's competitions.

Youth development has played an important role in Heywood's cricketing ethos. Several team members are also coaches. Heywood holds Clubmark status with the ECB.

== Professionals ==
They have employed many notable people as cricket professionals including former England coach and former Zimbabwe cricketer Andy Flower, West Indies fast bowlers Curtly Ambrose and Sherwin Campbell and Australian fast-bowler and former Pakistan coach Geoff Lawson. John Reid, the former New Zealand Test captain, scored more than 1,000 runs and took 100 wickets in a season for Heywood while the team's professional player in the early 1950s. England seam bowler Kate Cross became the first female cricketer to play in the Central Lancashire Cricket League when she took three wickets for Heywood in their opening fixture in 2015.

== First XI ==
First Division Winners 1904, 1929, 1931, 1945, 1960, 1963, 1967, 1968, 1974, 1976, 1984, 2006, 2008.

First Division Runners Up 1900, 1901, 1903, 1930, 1952, 1961, 1970, 1972, 1979.

Wood Cup Winners 1929, 1945, 1970, 1971, 1984, 1993, 2003, 2005, 2006, 2007.

Wood Cup Runners Up 1964 1983 2004

T20 Cup Winners 2009

Aggregate Cup Winners 1929, 1931, 1945, 1961, 1967, 1970, 1976, 1984

Subsidiary Cup 1st XI 1979, 1982 (Joint with Crompton), 1989

== Second XI ==
Second Division Winners 1945, 1967

Second Division Runners Up 1894, 1895, 1909, 1911, 1923, 1924, 1925, 1935, 1940, 1961, 1970, 1971, 1976.

Subsidiary Cup 1973, 2005

Burton Cup Winners 1984, 1996

Burton Cup Runners Up 1980

== Third XI ==
Roydes Trophy Winners 2004

League champions 2006

== Under 18s ==
Whittaker Cup Winners 1933, 1934, 1936, 1954, 1956, 1961, 1965, 1975 (With Milnrow) 1976 (With Littleborough) 1988, 1989, 1991, 1994, 2009, 2010

Taylor Cup Winners 1989, 1990, 2010

== Under 15s ==
Ashworth Trophy Winners: 1981, 1991, 2002, 2007

Knibbs Trophy Winners: 1981 (With Castleton Moor), 1984

Knibbs Trophy Eunners Up: 1980

Rhodes Trophy Winners: 1986

Rochdale Observer Trophy Winners: 2002, 2007
