= Banister (surname) =

Banister is a French surname, and may refer to:

Banister comes from the Old French or Old Norman banastre which was a type of wicker basket also related to the Modern French banne and to Occitan banasta.

- Barbara Banister (1895–1984), English artist
- Cyan Banister (born 1977), American investor and entrepreneur
- Frederick Banister (1823–1897), English civil engineer
- Guy Banister (1901–1964), a career employee of the Federal Bureau of Investigation and a private investigator
- Henry Banister (politician), English politician who sat in the House of Commons in 1614 and in 1625
- Henry Charles Banister (1831–1897) English author, composer and professor at Royal Academy of Music
- Jeff Banister (born 1964), American professional baseball player and coach
- John Riley Banister (1854–1918), American law officer, cowboy and Texas Ranger
- Richard Banister, English oculist of Stamford, Lincolnshire
- Scott Banister (born 1975), American entrepreneur

== See also ==
- Banister Fletcher (junior) (1866–1953), English architect and architectural historian
- Banister Fletcher (senior) (1833–1899), English architect, surveyor and politician
- John Banister (disambiguation)
- Thomas Banister (disambiguation)
- William Banister (disambiguation)
- Bannister (disambiguation)
- Roger Bannister, English former athlete, physician and academic
