= Bannister =

Bannister is a variant spelling of banister. However, it is a relatively common proper name as well.

== People ==
People whose surname is or was Bannister include:

- Alan Bannister (cyclist) (1922–2007), British silver medallist at the 1948 Summer Olympics
- Alan Bannister (born 1951), American baseball player
- Alex Bannister (born 1979), American football player
- Arthur Bannister (1875–1958), English cricketer
- Billy Bannister (1879–1942), English footballer
- Brian Bannister (born 1981), American baseball player
- Brown Bannister, music producer and songwriter
- Bruce Bannister (footballer) (born 1947), British football player
- Calvin Bannister (born 1984), Canadian football player
- Carys Bannister (1935–2010), British neurosurgeon
- Charles Bannister (1738–1804), British stage actor
- Charlie Bannister (1879–1952), English footballer
- Clive Bannister (born 1958), British, Chair Museum of London
- Drew Bannister (born 1974), Canadian ice hockey player
- Edward Bannister (born 1942), QC, British judge
- Edward Mitchell Bannister (c. 1828–1901), Canadian-American painter
- Ernest Bannister, English footballer
- Floyd Bannister (born 1955), American baseball player
- Freddy Bannister (1934–2019), British concert promoter
- Gary Bannister (born 1960), English football player
- Geoffrey Bannister (born 1946), English-American educator and geographer
- Grace Bannister (died 1986), Northern Ireland politician
- Harry Bannister (1889–1961), American actor
- Jack Bannister (1930–2016), English cricketer and sports reporter
- Jack Bannister, Australian actor in the 2023 film Birdeater
- Jack Bannister (footballer) (born 1942), English footballer
- Jarrod Bannister (born 1984), Australian javelin thrower
- Jenny Bannister, Australian fashion designer
- Jim Bannister (1929–2007), English footballer
- Jimmy Bannister (1880–1953), English football player
- Jo Bannister (born 1951), British crime fiction novelist
- John Bannister (disambiguation)
- Jordan Bannister (born 1982), Australian rules football umpire and former player
- Joseph Bannister, English pirate
- Keith Bannister (footballer, born 1923), English footballer
- Keith Bannister (footballer, born 1930), English footballer
- Ken Bannister (born 1960), American basketball player
- Matthew Bannister (born 1957), British media executive and broadcaster
- Matthew Bannister (musician) (born 1962), New Zealand musician, journalist, and academic
- Michael Bannister, Scottish musician
- Mike Bannister (born 1949), chief pilot of British Airways' Concorde fleet
- Miriam Bannister (1817–1928), English-American supercentenarian
- Monica Bannister (1910–2002), American actress
- Neil Bannister (born 1973), English cricketer
- Neville Bannister (born 1937), English footballer
- Nonna Bannister (1927–2004), Soviet-born American author
- Paul Bannister (born 1947), English footballer
- Reggie Bannister (born 1945), American actor and musician
- Richard Bannister Hughes (1810–1875), British businessman, active in Uruguay
- Roger Bannister (1929–2018), British athlete, the first man to run a four-minute mile
- Saxe Bannister (1790–1877), British-Australian lawyer and writer
- Steve Bannister (born 1987), English rugby player
- Thomas Bannister (1799–1874), British-Australian soldier and explorer
- Trevor Bannister (1934–2011), English actor
- Turpin Bannister (1904–1982), American architectural historian

== Places ==
- Bannister, Michigan
- Bannister, Missouri
- Bannister, Western Australia
- North Bannister, Western Australia
- Bannister River, Western Australia
- Bannister Green, Essex, England

== Ships ==
MV Bannister, British coaster previously named Empire Lundy

== See also ==
- Banister (surname)
- Banister
