= National League Division Two in 2005 =

The 2005 National League Division Two was the second division of England and Wales' domestic limited-overs cricket competition, the National League, which was sponsored by tote-sport that season. Ten teams participated, including nine county sides and one associate nation, the Scottish Saltires. The tournament followed a double round-robin format, with each team playing 18 matches (home and away against every opponent). Points were awarded for wins, ties, and no-results, with the top two teams earning promotion to Division One for the 2006 season.

Sussex Sharks won the division, finishing with 54 points from 13 wins, 4 losses, and 1 no-result. Their dominant performance secured an immediate return to the top tier. Durham Dynamos claimed the second promotion spot with 52 points, recording 12 wins and 4 losses alongside 2 abandoned matches. Both teams replaced the relegated sides from Division One.

Mid-table teams, such as Warwickshire Bears (44 points) and Leicestershire Foxes (42 points), remained competitive but fell short of promotion. Derbyshire Phantoms, Somerset Sabres, and Surrey Lions had inconsistent campaigns, while Kent Spitfires and Yorkshire Phoenix struggled near the bottom. The Scottish Saltires finished last with only 12 points and 2 wins, resulting in their withdrawal from future editions of the competition.

The 2005 season highlighted the competitiveness of Division Two, Sussex’s strong revival, and the challenges faced by non-English participants. It also prompted discussions about the league’s structure and the role of associate nations in English domestic cricket.

== Table ==
The table, showing all complete matches as at 14 September is as follows:

2005 totesport League – Division Two
Pos	Team	Pld	W	L	NR	T	Pts
1	Sussex Sharks	18	13	4	1	0	54
2	Durham Dynamos	18	12	4	2	0	52
3	Warwickshire Bears	18	10	6	2	0	44
4	Leicestershire Foxes	18	10	7	1	0	42
5	Derbyshire Phantoms	18	9	7	1	1	40
6	Somerset Sabres	18	9	8	1	0	38
7	Surrey Lions	18	7	10	1	0	30
8	Kent Spitfires	18	6	10	2	0	28
9	Yorkshire Phoenix	18	5	13	0	0	20
10	Scottish Saltires	18	2	14	1	1	12

=== Matches of 17 April ===
==== Derbyshire v Kent (17 April) ====
Match abandoned – Derbyshire (2pts), Kent (2pts)

Derbyshire, playing for the first time as the "Phantoms" lost the toss and were put in to bat at Derby. Opener Jonathan Moss made free at the start of the innings with 79 off 81 balls before he was bowled by Robert Ferley. His team-mates struggled, with only captain Luke Sutton, with 46, adding much to the score. Derbyshire scored 197 for 8 in their 45 overs. Only 5 overs of Kent Spitfires' innings were possible, in which time they made 9 for no loss. Rain then meant the match was abandoned. (BBC scorecard)

==== Leicestershire v Durham (17 April) ====
Durham (4pts) beat Leicestershire (0pts) by 9 runs (D/L method)

Leicestershire Foxes won the toss at Grace Road, Leicester and elected to bat. Liam Plunkett continued his good form, dismissing John Maunders and Aftab Habib early, as the Foxes faltered to 4 for 2. Darren Maddy and HD Ackerman then put on 98 for the third wicket, which helped Leicestershire to 175 for 8 off their 45 overs. Durham Dynamos edged to 85 for 3 from 33 overs, when rain prevented further play, leaving Durham the winners on the Duckworth–Lewis method. (BBC scorecard)

==== Surrey v Yorkshire (17 April) ====
Jimmy Ormond comes in to bowl for Surrey.

Yorkshire (4pts) beat Surrey (0pts) by 43 runs

At the Oval, Yorkshire Phoenix won the toss and batted. Matthew Wood anchored the innings with 111 off 127 balls, Australian Ian Harvey plundered 69 from 48, and Harvey's compatriot Phil Jaques took 49 from 39. Yorkshire ended on 334 for 5, a record score for them in the Sunday League against Surrey Lions. In reply Surrey tried to knock off their target in sixes, with 9 coming in their innings. Ali Brown scored 5 of them as he plundered 86 off 46. But wickets fell, and Surrey's specialist bowlers were not renowned for their batting abilities. When Brown was out, Surrey were 261 for 6, and still leading on Duckworth-Lewis. However, with no recognised batsmen left, only a Yorkshire victory was likely. When Mohammad Akram was stumped off a no-ball, Surrey were 291 all out, 43 runs in arrears. The pick of the Yorkshire bowling was captain Craig White with 4 for 14 in 4 overs. (BBC scorecard)

==== Warwickshire v Somerset (17 April) ====
Match abandoned – Warwickshire (2pts), Somerset (2pts)

Warwickshire won the toss at Edgbaston and put Somerset in to bat. Mike Burns dominated proceedings with his 107 from 134 balls, supported by Keith Parsons' 51 and James Hildreth's 54, as Somerset scored 254 for 5 in their 45 overs. However, then bad weather put an end to the day's play before Warwickshire had a chance to bat. (BBC scorecard)

==== Table at 17 April ====
totesport League – Division Two at 17 April 2005
Pos	Team	Pld	W	L	NR	Pts
1	Durham Dynamos	1	1	0	0	4
1	Yorkshire Phoenix	1	1	0	0	4
3	Derbyshire Phantoms	1	0	0	1	2
3	Kent Spitfires	1	0	0	1	2
3	Somerset Sabres	1	0	0	1	2
3	Warwickshire Bears	1	0	0	1	2
7	Leicestershire Foxes	1	0	1	0	0
7	Surrey Lions	1	0	1	0	0
7	Scottish Saltires	0	0	0	0	0
7	Sussex Sharks	0	0	0	0	0

=== Matches of 24 April ===
==== Durham v Surrey (24 April) ====
Durham (4pts) beat Surrey (0pts) by 138 runs

Durham Dynamos continued their perfect start to the season with an emphatic win at Chester-le-Street. Surrey Lions chose to bowl first, and Tim Murtagh with 3 for 12 performed well. But Dale Benkenstein and Gordon Muchall put on 100 together to help the Dynamos to 224 for 8. For the Lions it all went wrong between the sixth and eighth overs, during which they lost four wickets for two runs to plummet to 27 for 4. Liam Plunkett and Benkenstein took 4 wickets each as Surrey were dismissed for 86 in 30.1 overs. It's early in the season, but already Surrey are looking weak after their fourth successive match without a victory. (Cricinfo scorecard)

==== Kent v Leicestershire (24 April) ====
Kent (4pts) beat Leicestershire (0pts) by 6 runs (D/L method)

At Canterbury Leicestershire Foxes scored 214 from their 45 overs, with Dinesh Mongia contributing 62. Martin Saggers, who is not yet fully fit, took 3 for 46 for the Kent Spitfires. In reply, England openers Rob Key and Geraint Jones both failed, before South Africa's Martin van Jaarsveld continued his great start to the season with an unbeaten 69. Kent were 150 for 4 after 33.5 overs when rain and bad light brought an end to a closely fought game, which Kent took after being ahead according to the Duckworth–Lewis method. (Cricinfo scorecard)

==== Sussex v Derbyshire (24 April) ====
Sussex (4pts) beat Derbyshire (0pts) by 2 runs (D/L method)

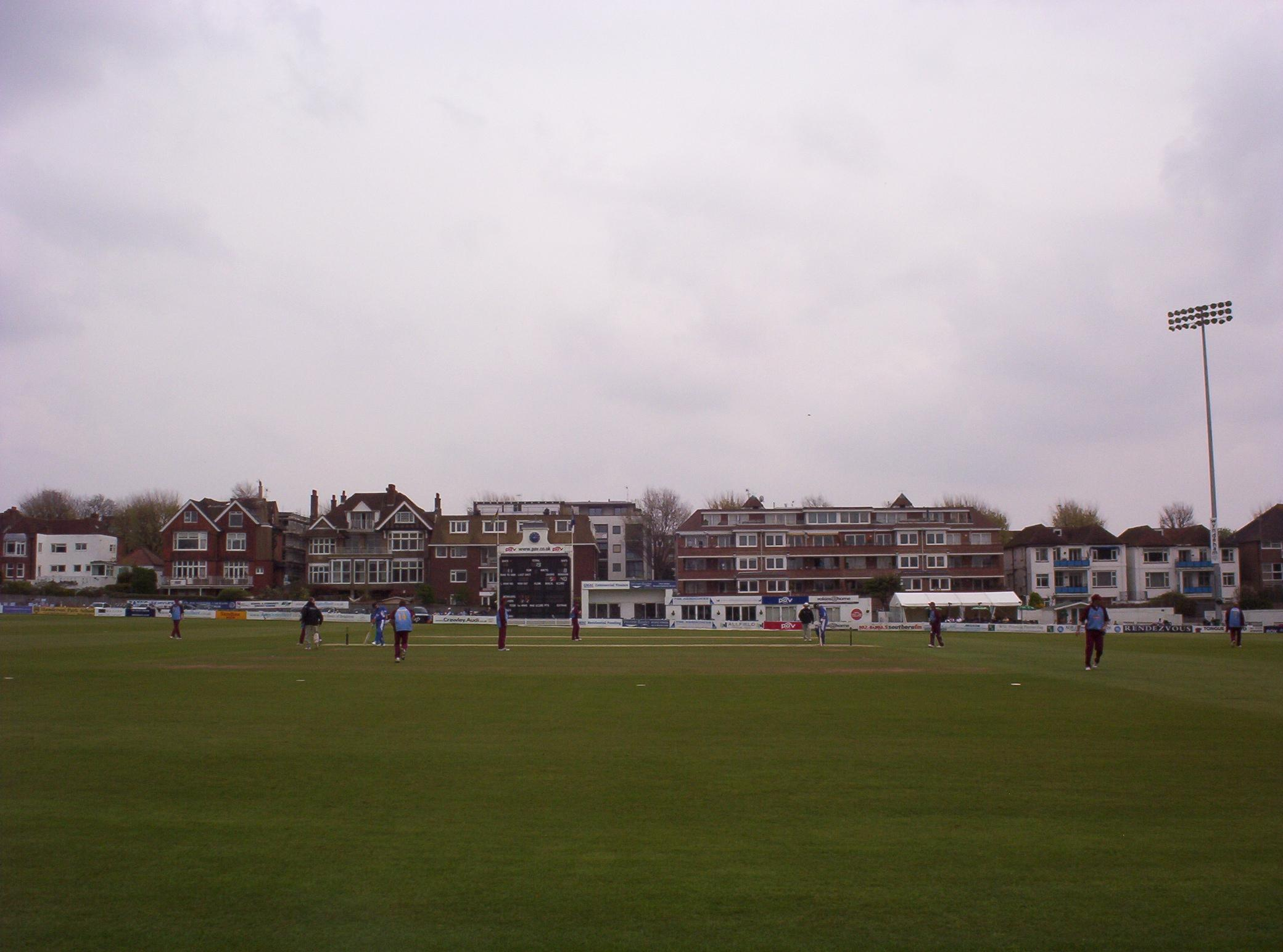
Derbyshire batting at Hove

A close game at Hove saw the Sharks defeat the Phantoms by 2 runs, after Tom Lungley went for, and failed to get, a six of the last ball to win the game. It was a high scoring affair, and halfway through their overs Sussex looked on target for a big total approaching 300. However, Derbyshire did well to peg them back to 254 to 8.

Rain delayed the restart, and left the Phantoms with 205 to win off 32 overs. They were always behind par, but never quite gave up. Indeed, Graeme Welch nearly won it for them with 42 off 24 balls, which included three huge sixes. However, wickets tumbled, leaving Tom Lungley with the last ball to score six. To his credit, he went for it and could have won, but fell short and was run out. (Cricinfo scorecard)

==== Yorkshire v Somerset (24 April) ====
Yorkshire (4pts) beat Somerset (0pts) by 5 wickets

The home side won easily at Headingley. The Sabres batted first and made 209 for 9 in their 45 overs, with four batsmen out with scores between 25 and 40. Former England Under-19 player Tim Bresnan took four for 25 for Yorkshire Phoenix. Yorkshire were always in control, thanks to a third-wicket partnership of 84 in 15 overs between Phil Jaques, who scored 84 off 78 balls, and Michael Lumb. Despite two late wickets, Yorkshire finished in style to win by 5 wickets with 32 balls remaining. (Cricinfo scorecard)

==== Table at 24 April ====
totesport League – Division Two at 24 April 2005
Pos	Team	Pld	W	L	NR	Pts
1	Durham Dynamos	2	2	0	0	8
2	Yorkshire Phoenix	2	2	0	0	8
3	Kent Spitfires	2	1	0	1	6
4	Sussex Sharks	1	1	0	0	4
5	Warwickshire Bears	1	0	0	1	2
6	Derbyshire Phantoms	2	0	1	1	2
7	Somerset Sabres	2	0	1	1	2
8	Leicestershire Foxes	2	0	2	0	0
9	Surrey Lions	2	0	2	0	0
10	Scottish Saltires	0	0	0	0	0

=== Matches of 1 May ===
==== Scotland v Durham (1 May) ====
Match abandoned – Scotland (2pts), Durham (2pts)

This match, which was due to be played at The Grange, Edinburgh, was rained off without a ball being bowled. (BBC news)

==== Somerset v Leicestershire (1 May) ====
Somerset (4pts) beat Leicestershire (0pts) by 8 wickets

The Leicestershire Foxes were restricted to 211 for 8 at Taunton, with Aaron Laraman the pick of the Somerset bowlers – his bowling analysis read 9–2–17–2. Four Leicestershire batsmen passed 30, yet the highest score of the innings was Paul Nixon's 41. John Francis and Keith Parsons then completed the win for the Sabres with 73 and 91 respectively, sharing a third-wicket partnership of 157. This gave Somerset their first win in any competition this season, and meant that the Foxes were still waiting for their first win. (BBC scorecard)

==== Warwickshire v Kent (1 May) ====
Warwickshire (4pts) beat Kent (0pts) by 19 runs

Nick Knight scored 122 off 125, the highest score of the National League season thus far, to boot the Bears up to 279 for 7 off their 45 overs. A spirited fightback from the Spitfires saw them hang in until the 44th over, but eventually, despite 82 from Martin van Jaarsveld and a 40-run last wicket stand between Simon Cook and Martin Saggers, they perished for 260 all out with 11 balls to go. (BBC scorecard)

==== Yorkshire v Sussex (1 May) ====
Yorkshire (4pts) beat Sussex (0pts) by 3 wickets

Richard Dawson and Craig White took 3 wickets apiece to help dismiss the Sharks for 157, as Sussex lost the last 7 wickets for 55 runs. Despite tight bowling from Mushtaq Ahmed on a damp pitch, the Phoenix eased to a win with 3 wickets and 27 balls remaining. Anthony McGrath (37) and Ian Harvey (30) shared a fifth-wicket stand of 63. (BBC scorecard)

==== Table at 1 May ====
totesport League – Division Two at 1 May 2005
Pos	Team	Pld	W	L	NR	Pts
1	Yorkshire Phoenix	3	3	0	0	12
2	Durham Dynamos	3	2	0	1	10
3	Warwickshire Bears	2	1	0	1	6
4	Kent Spitfires	3	1	1	1	6
5	Somerset Sabres	3	1	1	1	6
6	Sussex Sharks	2	1	1	0	4
7	Scottish Saltires	1	0	0	1	2
8	Derbyshire Phantoms	2	0	1	1	2
9	Leicestershire Foxes	3	0	3	0	0
10	Surrey Lions	2	0	2	0	0

=== May Day Bank Holiday matches (2 May) ===
==== Durham v Sussex (2 May) ====
No result – Durham (2pts), Sussex (2pts)

At Chester-le-Street Durham Dynamos won the toss and put Sussex Sharks in to bat. Steve Harmison bowled well for his 1 for 24 off 9 overs, though it was Mick Lewis who took the wickets, ending with 5 for 48. For the Sharks, Johannes van der Wath top scored with 80 and shared a 110-run partnership with Robin Martin-Jenkins to pull Sussex out from 60 for 5 to a final total of 182 for 7 in 45 overs. In reply the Dynamos slumped to 9 for 2 off 7.3 overs, losing both openers for ducks before rain came and finished the match 15 balls before Duckworth-Lewis could be applied. (Cricinfo scorecard)

==== Somerset v Surrey (2 May) ====
Somerset (4pts) beat Surrey (0pts) by 99 runs (D/L method)

Surrey Lions were never in this game, which was played at Taunton. The Sabres totalled a mammoth 325 for 6 in their 44 overs, with Sanath Jayasuriya (61 off 49), Marcus Trescothick (52 off 43) and Keith Parsons (85 off 75) doing most of the damage. The Lions were never in the hunt in reply. Whilst Ali Brown top-scored with a 37-ball 65, including seven fours and three sixes, wickets fell at regular intervals, and they finally finished on 226 for 9, 99 behind. (Cricinfo scorecard)

==== Table at 2 May ====
totesport League – Division Two at 2 May 2005
Pos	Team	Pld	W	L	NR	Pts
1	Yorkshire Phoenix	3	3	0	0	12
2	Durham Dynamos	4	2	0	2	12
3	Somerset Sabres	4	2	1	1	10
4	Warwickshire Bears	2	1	0	1	6
5	Sussex Sharks	3	1	1	1	6
6	Kent Spitfires	3	1	1	1	6
7	Scottish Saltires	1	0	0	1	2
8	Derbyshire Phantoms	2	0	1	1	2
9	Leicestershire Foxes	3	0	3	0	0
10	Surrey Lions	3	0	3	0	0

=== Matches of 8 May ===
==== Scotland v Kent (8 May) ====
Kent (4pts) beat Scotland (0pts) by 93 runs (D/L method)

Kent Spitfires demolished the Scottish Saltires at their home ground in a rain-haunted match. Winning the toss and bowling, Scotland did not quite get the wickets they wanted, the South African Martin van Jaarsveld top-scoring for Kent with 57 while Darren Stevens smashed 51 off 30 balls towards the end. Scotland's innings was frequently interrupted by rain and Darren Stevens' bowling – he took five for 32, his first career five-for, as Scotland crawled to 134 all out in 32.2 overs – 94 short of the adjusted target, coincidentally exactly the same as Kent had made, but shortened by seven overs. (Cricinfo scorecard)

==== Sussex v Warwickshire (8 May) ====
Sussex (4pts) beat Warwickshire (0pts) by 44 runs (D/L method)

Sussex Sharks had England wicket-keeper Matt Prior and former Zimbabwe batsman Murray Goodwin to thank for their imposing win over the Bears. Prior scored 144 – a career best score – and Goodwin 79 to lift Sussex to a massive 283 for 7, Zimbabwe all-rounder Heath Streak the only bowler with reasonably respectable figures of three for 39 off 9 overs. The reply was shortened by rain, setting Warwickshire 198 to win off 30 overs, but after 48 from Neil Carter there was little left in the Warwickshire reply as they finished on 153 for 7. (Cricinfo scorecard)

==== Table at 8 May ====
totesport League – Division Two at 8 May 2005
Pos	Team	Pld	W	L	NR	Pts
1	Yorkshire Phoenix	3	3	0	0	12
2	Durham Dynamos	4	2	0	2	12
3	Kent Spitfires	4	2	1	1	10
4	Somerset Sabres	4	2	1	1	10
5	Sussex Sharks	4	2	1	1	10
6	Warwickshire Bears	3	1	1	1	6
7	Derbyshire Phantoms	2	0	1	1	2
8	Scottish Saltires	2	0	1	1	2
9	Leicestershire Foxes	3	0	3	0	0
10	Surrey Lions	3	0	3	0	0

=== Match of 11 May ===
==== Scotland v Somerset (11 May) ====
Somerset (4pts) beat Scotland (0pts) by 16 runs

Somerset Sabres won thanks to a slogging effort by all-rounder Ian Blackwell who rescued them from a potentially dangerous position at Edinburgh. Winning the toss and batting, Scottish Saltires' bowlers Asim Butt, Majid Haq and Paul Hoffmann (who bowled 9 overs for 14 runs) tied the visitors down to 145 for 5 before Blackwell came on. Blackwell then proceeded to slam everything out of sight, smacking six sixes and seven fours in his 86 and lifting Somerset to 264 for 7. Colin Smith was the star of Scotland's reply, making 67, but they were never seriously in the chase, especially after Andy Caddick removed Pakistani all-rounder Yasir Arafat and Smith. (Cricinfo scorecard)

==== Table at 11 May ====
totesport League – Division Two at 11 May 2005
Pos	Team	Pld	W	L	NR	Pts
1	Somerset Sabres	5	3	1	1	14
2	Yorkshire Phoenix	3	3	0	0	12
3	Durham Dynamos	4	2	0	2	12
4	Kent Spitfires	4	2	1	1	10
5	Sussex Sharks	4	2	1	1	10
6	Warwickshire Bears	3	1	1	1	6
7	Derbyshire Phantoms	2	0	1	1	2
8	Scottish Saltires	3	0	2	1	2
9	Leicestershire Foxes	3	0	3	0	0
10	Surrey Lions	3	0	3	0	0

=== Matches of 15 May ===
==== Durham v Yorkshire (15 May) ====
Durham (4pts) beat Yorkshire (0pts) by 51 runs

Durham continued their fine start to the season with a comfortable win at Chester-le-Street. They started slowly, making only 60 (for no loss) after 20 overs. But helped by Mike Hussey they picked up the pace, ending on 256 for 4. Yorkshire's reply started quicker, but the Dynamos kept taking wickets, finally dismissing the Phoenix for 205. Paul Collingwood and Gareth Breese took 3 each. (Cricinfo scorecard)

==== Leicestershire v Surrey (15 May) ====
Leicestershire (4pts) beat Surrey (0pts) by 60 runs

Surrey Lions continued their miserable form in the Sunday League, as they went down to their fourth defeat in four matches to be at the very bottom of the National League table. Leicestershire Foxes batted first, making 194 for 9, as almost all of their batsmen scored below their batting average, apart from Dinesh Mongia, who made 67. Mongia followed this up with 4 for 15 with the ball, dismissing Surrey for 134, after Scott Newman and Mark Ramprakash had taken them to 55 for 1. A total of 10 maiden overs were bowled in the Surrey innings. (Cricinfo scorecard)

==== Table at 15 May ====
totesport League – Division Two at 15 May 2005
Pos	Team	Pld	W	L	NR	Pts
1	Durham Dynamos	5	3	0	2	16
2	Somerset Sabres	5	3	1	1	14
3	Yorkshire Phoenix	4	3	1	0	12
4	Kent Spitfires	4	2	1	1	10
5	Sussex Sharks	4	2	1	1	10
6	Warwickshire Bears	3	1	1	1	6
7	Leicestershire Foxes	4	1	3	0	4
8	Derbyshire Phantoms	2	0	1	1	2
9	Scottish Saltires	3	0	2	1	2
10	Surrey Lions	4	0	4	0	0

=== Matches of 20 May ===
==== Derbyshire v Warwickshire (20 May) ====
Warwickshire (4pts) beat Derbyshire (0pts) by 52 runs

Derbyshire Phantoms suffered another drubbing at Derby after Warwickshire Bears raced past 200 thanks to half-centuries from Nick Knight and Jim Troughton. Although 6 wickets fell in the last 10 overs, they still made 260, with Troughton top-scoring with 73. In reply, Derbyshire lost wickets regularly, and although Jonathan Moss scored 65, no-one was able to stay with him as the hosts were all out for 208. (Cricinfo scorecard)

==== Scotland v Surrey (20 May) ====
Surrey (4pts) beat Scotland (0pts) by 5 wickets

Scottish Saltires batted first at The Grange in Edinburgh. Jonathan Beukes, their South African import put on 91 from 86 balls as Scotland scored 252 for 7, their highest score of their National League season. Surrey had lost all 4 one-day league games before this match, and when they were reduced to 90 for 3, another defeat seemed on the cards. However, Graham Thorpe took 69 from 89 balls and Ali Brown 65 from 45 to give Surrey their first points with 6.3 overs to spare. (Cricinfo scorecard)

==== Table at 20 May ====
totesport League – Division Two at 20 May 2005
Pos	Team	Pld	W	L	NR	Pts
1	Durham Dynamos	5	3	0	2	16
2	Somerset Sabres	5	3	1	1	14
3	Yorkshire Phoenix	4	3	1	0	12
4	Kent Spitfires	4	2	1	1	10
5	Sussex Sharks	4	2	1	1	10
6	Warwickshire Bears	4	2	1	1	10
7	Leicestershire Foxes	4	1	3	0	4
8	Surrey Lions	5	1	4	0	4
9	Derbyshire Phantoms	3	0	2	1	2
10	Scottish Saltires	4	0	3	1	2

=== Matches of 29 May ===
==== Kent v Durham (29 May) ====
Durham (4pts) beat Kent (0pts) by 1 run

Durham Dynamos extended their unbeaten run in National League games to six games as they pulled off a remarkable comeback at Kent Spitfires. Having won the toss and batted, Durham made 189 after having been pegged back by South African Andrew Hall who took 3 for 17 off 8.5 overs. In reply, Hall made 72 as Kent cruised to 128 for 2 and 170 for 3, but Durham's players fought back. With the main damage coming from their internationals Ashley Noffke (three for 33) and Nathan Astle (two for 21), Kent lost six wickets for 17 runs, and Kent were tied down to such an extent that they needed three runs off the last ball to win – Martin Saggers could only scrape the one bye. (Cricinfo scorecard)

==== Warwickshire v Scotland (29 May) ====
Scotland (4pts) beat Warwickshire (0pts) by one wicket

A poor pitch at Stratford-on-Avon, and some lacklustre batting saw the Warwickshire Bears record their second loss in the National League, as they crumbled to 113 all out on their home ground. Australian-born Paul Hoffmann took three for 19 for Scotland Saltires, but all the Scottish bowlers chipped in with wickets, and it was in fact a good recovery from Warwickshire as they were 17 for 5 and 48 for 7. In reply, Dougie Lockhart and South African Jonathan Beukes recorded good partnership to lift Scotland to 70 for 1, but a burst of wickets from Heath Streak turned the match again, as Scotland lost four wickets for 20 runs. However, Hoffmann saw Scotland across the line, smashing a six off Neil Carter to win the match by one wicket. Extras were the second-highest scorer, with 28, as Warwickshire conceded 20 wides. (Cricinfo scorecard)

==== Table at 29 May ====
totesport League – Division Two at 29 May 2005
Pos	Team	Pld	W	L	NR	Pts
1	Durham Dynamos	6	4	0	2	20
2	Somerset Sabres	5	3	1	1	14
3	Yorkshire Phoenix	4	3	1	0	12
4	Kent Spitfires	5	2	2	1	10
5	Sussex Sharks	4	2	1	1	10
6	Warwickshire Bears	5	2	2	1	10
7	Scottish Saltires	5	1	3	1	6
8	Leicestershire Foxes	4	1	3	0	4
9	Surrey Lions	5	1	4	0	4
10	Derbyshire Phantoms	3	0	2	1	2

=== Spring Bank Holiday matches (30 May) ===
==== Derbyshire v Leicestershire (30 May) ====
Derbyshire (4pts) beat Leicestershire by 6 wickets

Derbyshire's Kevin Dean took 5 for 45 in his comeback match after suffering chicken pox in the week. Dean's effort helped reduce Leicestershire Foxes to 55 for 6 at the end of the fifteenth over at Derby. John Sadler came in and made 50 before he was stumped off Ant Botha's bowling, but he could only help Leicestershire along to 146 all out. Derbyshire took their time in trying conditions, but still made their target with 4 wickets down and 21 balls to go, as Michael Di Venuto top-scored with 48. (Cricinfo scorecard)

==== Somerset v Sussex (30 May) ====
Sussex (4pts) beat Somerset (0pts) by 2 wickets

Sussex edged past Somerset with 2 balls and 2 wickets remaining. Somerset won the toss, batted, and fell to 88 for 5 against Sussex's tight bowling before Ian Blackwell smashed 10 sixes and 10 fours as he made 134 not out off only 71 balls. 4 of his sixes came in the 40th over, bowled by Mushtaq Ahmed: the first three balls went for six, then there were two singles, before Blackwell smashed the last ball out of the ground into the car park. His quickfire innings helped Somerset to 297 for 6 off their 45 overs. In reply Matt Prior made 77, but Sussex looked like a defeated side after 4 wickets from Keith Parsons sent them to 201 for 7, but Johannes van der Wath smashed 73 off 43 balls to sneak the victory, sharing an 82-run ninth-wicket stand with Jason Lewry. (Cricinfo scorecard)

==== Surrey v Durham (30 May) ====
Surrey (4pts) beat Durham (0pts) by 43 runs

Durham fell to their first defeat of their totesport League campaign at the Oval as Surrey's youngsters rescued them from what could have been yet another Surrey batting collapse – they had lost 9 or 10 wickets in 4 of their 5 League matches so far, and had made 2 scores below 140. The hosts batted first, and their position looked dire as they were soon on 26 for 4, with Liam Plunkett and Neil Killeen taking two wickets each. James Benning, with 66 off 84 balls, and Rikki Clarke, with 54 off 67 balls, then put on 129, a record for Surrey against Durham. In the 38 overs the weather allowed, Surrey made 219. Tim Murtagh then took 3 wickets without conceding a run in his first 3 overs to knock Durham back. Whilst they threatened for a while thanks to a 95-run partnership between Nicky Peng and Dale Benkenstein, they never fully recovered and were finally all out for 176. (Cricinfo scorecard)

==== Yorkshire v Scotland (30 May) ====
Yorkshire (4pts) beat Scotland (0pts) by 60 runs

Despite four Yorkshire Phoenix run outs, and four maidens from Paul Hoffmann, the hosts still managed to score 214 all out in the first innings at Headingley, Anthony McGrath making 57 from number five. Scotland Saltires then crumbled to 154, former England all-rounder Craig White taking three Scottish wickets as only the hired-in man from Durham, Gavin Hamilton, managed some resistance with the bat. Hamilton, who had played ODI cricket for Scotland at the 1999 World Cup, made 60, but he was one of only two Scots to pass 20. Yorkshire continued their promotion charge, however, as they jumped ahead of Somerset in the table and into second place. However, after this match, Yorkshire only won one of their remaining fourteen games. (Cricinfo scorecard)

==== Table at 30 May ====
totesport League – Division Two at 30 May 2005
Pos	Team	Pld	W	L	NR	Pts
1	Durham Dynamos	7	4	1	2	20
2	Yorkshire Phoenix	5	4	1	0	16
3	Somerset Sabres	6	3	2	1	14
4	Sussex Sharks	5	3	1	1	14
5	Kent Spitfires	5	2	2	1	10
6	Warwickshire Bears	5	2	2	1	10
7	Surrey Lions	6	2	4	0	8
8	Derbyshire Phantoms	4	1	2	1	6
9	Scottish Saltires	6	1	4	1	6
10	Leicestershire Foxes	5	1	4	0	4

=== Matches of 5 June ===
==== Leicestershire v Somerset (5 June) ====
Leicestershire (4pts) beat Somerset (0pts) by 71 runs

Leicestershire Foxes moved out of the bottom place with a comfortable win over Somerset Sabres at Oakham School. With Dinesh Mongia top-scoring with 75 as no Somerset bowler dug into the Leicestershire innings, they made 217 for 4 with relative ease, before crumbling to the left-arm spin of Mongia, as he took four wickets for 12 runs including captain and top-scorer Graeme Smith. Smith made 61 in a Somerset innings were only four batsmen made it into double figures, and the visitors crumbled to 146 all out. (Cricinfo scorecard)

==== Kent v Derbyshire (5 June) ====
Derbyshire (4pts) beat Kent (0pts) by 90 runs

Derbyshire Phantoms came to Maidstone and Kent Spitfires with only one win in their first four games. However, the way in which they won this one was emphatic. Kent captain David Fulton won the toss and chose to field, and Australian Michael Di Venuto ridiculed his choice with an 80-ball century with twelve fours and a six. In the end, he was out for 116 off 90 balls, but when everyone else hit at nearly a run a ball and Kent could only take three wickets, Derbyshire amassed 304 for 3. Kent gave it their best shot in the chase, Andrew Hall making 61 from the top of the order, but despite late order smashing from Justin Kemp (27) and Amjad Khan (33), Kent ended all out for 214, 91 runs short with 38 balls remaining. (Cricinfo scorecard)

==== Surrey v Warwickshire (5 June) ====
Warwickshire (4pts) beat Surrey (0pts) by 49 runs

At Whitgift School, Warwickshire Bears recorded a massive 309 for 8 in 45 overs to bat Surrey Lions out of the game. Neil Carter opened the innings with a typical 58 off only 36 balls, smashing four sixes and five fours in the process, while James Troughton scored 69. Only medium-pacer Neil Saker, playing in his seventh List-A game, avoided the routing as he was hit for 17 off five overs, taking the wicket of Jonathan Trott for 9. In reply, Mark Ramprakash and Ali Brown looked to take Surrey to the target, but when Brown departed for 52 off 34 balls, the air went out of Surrey's balloon. Ramprakash scored 89 not out, and became Surrey's top scorer, but Surrey finished all out for 260 with 22 balls remaining in their innings as Carter took three for 37 while Heath Streak and Dougie Brown snared two wickets each. (Cricinfo scorecard)

==== Table at 5 June ====
totesport League – Division Two at 5 June 2005
Pos	Team	Pld	W	L	NR	Pts
1	Durham Dynamos	7	4	1	2	20
2	Yorkshire Phoenix	5	4	1	0	16
3	Sussex Sharks	5	3	1	1	14
4	Somerset Sabres	7	3	3	1	14
5	Warwickshire Bears	6	3	2	1	14
6	Derbyshire Phantoms	5	2	2	1	10
7	Kent Spitfires	6	2	3	1	10
8	Surrey Lions	7	2	5	0	8
9	Leicestershire Foxes	6	2	4	0	8
10	Scottish Saltires	6	1	4	1	6

=== Match of 10 June ===
==== Scotland v Sussex (10 June) ====
Sussex (4pts) beat Scotland (0pts) by 8 wickets

Scotland had a bad week. First, Asim Butt, the leading Scottish seam bowler was banned for a year after testing positive for ecstasy. They then went down heavily to Sussex Sharks at The Grange in their last home game before the 2005 ICC Trophy in three weeks' time. The Saltires batted first and lost wickets regularly. Only Colin Smith, with 61, made any sort of score as they were dismissed for 172. The Sharks chased down the target easily, as openers Matt Prior and Ian Ward put on 108, and whilst Scotland were able to take two wickets, Sussex sped home with 16.3 overs to spare. (Cricinfo scorecard)

==== Table at 10 June ====
totesport League – Division Two at 10 June 2005
Pos	Team	Pld	W	L	NR	Pts
1	Durham Dynamos	7	4	1	2	20
2	Sussex Sharks	6	4	1	1	18
3	Yorkshire Phoenix	5	4	1	0	16
4	Somerset Sabres	7	3	3	1	14
5	Warwickshire Bears	6	3	2	1	14
6	Derbyshire Phantoms	5	2	2	1	10
7	Kent Spitfires	6	2	3	1	10
8	Surrey Lions	7	2	5	0	8
9	Leicestershire Foxes	6	2	4	0	8
10	Scottish Saltires	7	1	5	1	6

=== Matches of 12 and 13 June ===
==== Leicestershire v Yorkshire (12 June) ====
Leicestershire (4pts) beat Yorkshire (0pts) by 7 wickets

In a low-scoring match at Grace Road, Yorkshire recorded 172 for 9, despite Anthony McGrath and Michael Lumb pairing up for 67 for the third wicket. Apart from those two, though, none of the Yorkshire batsmen could contribute, and slow accumulation from the Leicestershire batsmen was the key to reaching the target. Dinesh Mongia then took on Yorkshire's bowlers, adding 46 off 38 balls, as singles were taken near the end to see the hosts to the target with seventeen deliveries left in the match. (Cricinfo scorecard)

==== Somerset v Kent (12 June) ====
Kent (4pts) beat Somerset (0pts) by 74 runs

Martin van Jaarsveld continued his stunning form for Kent Spitfires with 114 against Somerset Sabres which lifted the visitors to a massive 319 for 5, as the bowlers were smashed to all corners of the Recreation Ground in Bath. In reply, Ian Blackwell smashed 57 off 42 balls, but it was never enough as Somerset were all out in 37.3 overs – with 45 balls potentially remaining of their innings – for 245. (Cricinfo scorecard)

==== Durham v Derbyshire (13 June) ====
Durham (4pts) beat Derbyshire (0pts) by five wickets

A dismal batting performance from Derbyshire Phantoms, as they crumbled to 82 all out at Riverside Ground, gave Durham Dynamos yet another victory in the National League. Dale Benkenstein took four for 17, including two wickets in his first over, and Australian Ashley Noffke showed good bowling form with three for 16 and three maidens in seven overs. Despite losing wickets early in the chase, crumbling to 36 for 4, Gordon Muchall and Gary Pratt added 40 for the fifth wicket to send Durham to a five-wicket win with just under 10 overs to spare. (Cricinfo scorecard)

==== Table at 13 June ====
totesport League – Division Two at 13 June 2005
Pos	Team	Pld	W	L	NR	Pts
1	Durham Dynamos	8	5	1	2	24
2	Sussex Sharks	6	4	1	1	18
3	Yorkshire Phoenix	6	4	2	0	16
4	Kent Spitfires	7	3	3	1	14
5	Warwickshire Bears	6	3	2	1	14
6	Somerset Sabres	8	3	4	1	14
7	Leicestershire Foxes	7	3	4	0	12
8	Derbyshire Phantoms	6	2	3	1	10
9	Surrey Lions	7	2	5	0	8
10	Scottish Saltires	7	1	5	1	6

=== Matches of 17–20 June ===
==== Somerset v Scotland (17 June) ====
Scotland (4pts) beat Somerset (0pts) by 15 runs

Only a couple of days ago, the lads from Somerset had beaten Australia's finest by five wickets, chasing the highest score in one-day matches. Now, they failed to chase down 233 set by the Scottish Saltires, after Jonathan Beukes smashed 92 and Yasir Arafat supplied with a 20-ball 32 including two sixes. It started well enough for Somerset, Graeme Smith continuing his fine form with 74, leading his team to 158 for 4. But then, the wheels fell off. Paul Hoffmann snared the important wicket of James Hildreth for 49, the lower order rolled over meekly to Arafat (who got 3–33), and with Jon Francis injured, the Sabres managed to lose the match by 15 runs as they were all out for 218. (Cricinfo scorecard)

==== Warwickshire v Leicestershire (19 June) ====
Leicestershire (4pts) beat Warwickshire (0pts) by seven wickets

The most striking feature of this match would be Ashley Giles returning to bowl for Warwickshire Bears after a hip injury, replacing Heath Streak, who had been injured in the groin in the previous match. However, it couldn't help them against Leicestershire Foxes. The hosts won the toss and batted first, and promptly crumbled to 43 for 4, after good new-ball bowling from Ottis Gibson and Charl Willoughby. Jonathan Trott hit 93, however, as the Bears recovered to 217 for 6. Their innings included three run outs. Leicestershire were always on target and won with eight balls to spare, Darren Maddy recording a 114-ball century and ending with 107 not out as Leicestershire reached 218 for 3. (Cricinfo scorecard)

==== Sussex v Durham (19 June) ====
Sussex (4pts) beat Durham (0pts) by seven wickets

Durham Dynamos sorely missed their two international stars, Steve Harmison and Paul Collingwood, as they whimpered to a seven-wicket defeat in the top-of-the-table clash at Arundel against Sussex Sharks. Dale Benkenstein won the toss and chose to have his Durham side bat first, as he made 57 not out from number five, but there was woefully little support as Durham collapsed from 129 for 3 to 195 all out. James Kirtley was the main culprit with four for 29 but every Sussex bowler except Robin Martin-Jenkins got among the wickets. In reply, Ian Ward blitzed 93 off 75 balls, Chris Adams was just as punishing with 58 off 49, and Liam Plunkett was plundered for 46 off only four overs – including nine wides. In only 29.3 overs, the match was over, Sussex getting a bit of Twenty20 practice in as they closed the gap at the top of the table to two points. (Cricinfo scorecard)

==== Derbyshire v Scotland (19 June) ====
Derbyshire (2pts) tied with Scotland (2pts)

The first tie of the National League season at The County Ground, Derby was another positive experience for the Scottish Saltires a week before they travelled to Ireland to participate in the ICC Trophy. Derbyshire Phantoms won the toss and batted, and it was only thanks to a century from Australian import Michael Di Venuto that they passed 200 and ended up with a final total of 220 for 8 – along with 33 not out from Andre Botha. Scotland's reply was hampered by Kevin Dean who took three early wickets to reduce the Scots to 31 for 3, but Douglas Lockhart made his highest career score with 88 not out to set Scotland back on track. On the last ball, Scotland needed two runs to win with South African-born number 11 Dewald Nel on strike – he could only scamper one with Lockhart, and the teams shared the spoils. (Cricinfo scorecard)

==== Leicestershire v Scotland (20 June) ====
Leicestershire (4pts) beat Scotland (0pts) by 20 runs

The Scottish Saltires threw away a good bowling performance at Grace Road against Leicestershire Foxes. Winning the toss and batting first, Leicestershire only made 208 for 7, none of the batsmen passing fifty but seven finishing in double figures. Dewald Nel took three for 39 for the Scots, but nine overs of Charl Willoughby was evidently too much for the Saltires. He conceded 12 runs, taking two wickets and bowling three maidens in the process, and was a major factor as Scotland imploded to 78 for 6. Despite number 10 Greg Maiden making 35, Scotland were all out for 188 with an over remaining. (Cricinfo scorecard)

==== Tables at 20 June ====
totesport League – Division Two at 20 June 2005
Pos	Team	Pld	W	L	NR	T	Pts
1	Durham Dynamos	9	5	2	2	0	24
2	Sussex Sharks	7	5	1	1	0	22
3	Leicestershire Foxes	9	5	4	0	0	20
4	Yorkshire Phoenix	6	4	2	0	0	16
5	Kent Spitfires	7	3	3	1	0	14
6	Warwickshire Bears	7	3	3	1	0	14
7	Somerset Sabres	9	3	5	1	0	14
8	Derbyshire Phantoms	7	2	3	1	1	12
9	Scottish Saltires	10	2	6	1	1	12
10	Surrey Lions	7	2	5	0	0	8

=== Post-Twenty20 resumption ===
==== Sussex v Kent (8 July) ====
Sussex (4pts) beat Kent (0pts) by four wickets

Sussex Sharks regained the lead in Division Two of the National League with a win over Kent Spitfires in a low-scoring match at The County Ground, Hove. Sussex' Pakistani cricketers Rana Naved-ul-Hasan and Mushtaq Ahmed took three and two wickets respectively, reducing Kent to 106 for 7, before James Kirtley mopped up the tail with three balls remaining of Kent's innings, for 155. Then, a fiery opening spell from Simon Cook, who had hit an unbeaten 28 with the bat, resulted in three quick wickets (he ended with excellent figures of three for 15 off nine overs) and sent Sussex down to 22 for 4. However, Michael Yardy and Carl Hopkinson paired up for 103 for the fifth wicket, and Yardy's 65 anchored a nervy chase as Sussex reached the target with 3.3 overs remaining. (Cricinfo scorecard)

==== Warwickshire v Derbyshire (9 July) ====
Warwickshire (4pts) beat Derbyshire (0pts) by five wickets

Warwickshire Bears squeezed to a five-wicket win at Edgbaston thanks to good bowling and a quickfire innings from wicket-keeper Trevor Penney. Derbyshire Phantoms batted first, losing wickets regularly, with only Steve Stubbings making over 25 with his 108-ball 69. Neil Carter excelled with the ball, taking three for 28, although four of six Warwickshire bowlers took part in Derbyshire's collapse to 201 for 9. Warwickshire's reply was haunted by wickets taken by Jonathan Moss – who ended with three for 32 – however, Jonathan Trott and Trevor Penney added 38 for the last wicket, and Warwickshire passed the target with five balls to spare. (Cricinfo scorecard)

==== Table at 9 July ====
totesport League – Division Two at 9 July 2005
Pos	Team	Pld	W	L	NR	T	Pts
1	Sussex Sharks	8	6	1	1	0	26
2	Durham Dynamos	9	5	2	2	0	24
3	Leicestershire Foxes	9	5	4	0	0	20
4	Warwickshire Bears	8	4	3	1	0	18
5	Yorkshire Phoenix	6	4	2	0	0	16
6	Kent Spitfires	8	3	4	1	0	14
7	Somerset Sabres	9	3	5	1	0	14
8	Derbyshire Phantoms	8	2	4	1	1	12
9	Scottish Saltires	10	2	6	1	1	12
10	Surrey Lions	7	2	5	0	0	8

=== Mid-week game ===
==== Yorkshire v Surrey (13 July) ====
Surrey (4pts) beat Yorkshire (0pts) by three runs

Yorkshire Phoenix failed to convert a good position against Surrey Lions, who moved off last place in the table with a win. Having initially been placed in the field by Surrey's captain Mark Ramprakash, they conceded 111 for the first wicket, James Benning and Jonathan Batty making 72 and 41 respectively. A burst of three wickets from Richard Dawson's off-spin sent Surrey struggling at 127 for 4, but Ramprakash paired up with Rikki Clarke to recover, and Clarke then unleashed a late cameo off Ian Harvey to end with 90 not out off 71 balls to see Surrey to a final total of 264 for 7. In reply, Yorkshire looked confident at 222 for 2, recovering from the early shock of losing Matthew Wood for a golden duck. However, a couple of run-outs and a wicket from Tim Murtagh saw Tim Bresnan face the last ball with Yorkshire needing four to win – he was bowled by Nayan Doshi, and Surrey won by three runs, despite conceding 15 wides. (Cricinfo scorecard)

==== Table at 13 July 2005 ====
totesport League – Division Two at 13 July 2005
Pos	Team	Pld	W	L	NR	T	Pts
1	Sussex Sharks	8	6	1	1	0	26
2	Durham Dynamos	9	5	2	2	0	24
3	Leicestershire Foxes	9	5	4	0	0	20
4	Warwickshire Bears	8	4	3	1	0	18
5	Yorkshire Phoenix	7	4	3	0	0	16
6	Kent Spitfires	8	3	4	1	0	14
7	Somerset Sabres	9	3	5	1	0	14
8	Surrey Lions	8	3	5	0	0	12
9	Derbyshire Phantoms	8	2	4	1	1	12
10	Scottish Saltires	10	2	6	1	1	12

=== Third Sunday in July ===
==== Durham v Warwickshire (17 July) ====
Warwickshire (4pts) beat Durham (0pts) by five wickets

Durham Dynamos were to regret their decision of batting first against Warwickshire Bears. On a poor pitch, Warwickshire bowlers Heath Streak, Dougie Brown and Neil Carter took full advantage – the latter two bowling a total of nine maiden overs, while Streak took three for 13 before breaking down with an injury. Durham were 49 for 8 before Liam Plunkett and Neil Killeen chipped in with low but sensible scores, while Dale Benkenstein made 90 at the other end – over sixty per cent of Durham's total of 147. Despite Ashley Noffke taking two early wickets, Alex Loudon anchored the chase with 51 off 61 deliveries, and Warwickshire batted to 148 for 5 with over ten overs remaining. (Cricinfo scorecard)

==== Surrey v Derbyshire (17 July) ====
Derbyshire (4pts) beat Surrey (0pts) by five wickets

Surrey Lions' dismal one-day season continued. Despite innings between 39 and 46 from the men batting from one to four, and a quickfire 29 from spinner Nayan Doshi which led to a defendable total of 260 for 8, the track at The Oval still yielded many runs, and Steve Stubbings and Michael Di Venuto slashed boundaries at will – a total of 27 were noted, including two sixes from Stubbings, and the boundaries were worth 112 of the pair's 196 runs. To add to that, Surrey bowled 24 extras, so their partnership had yielded 217 runs before Mohammad Akram broke through their defences – as both were dismissed two runs short of a century. The damage was done, however, and Derbyshire Phantoms ended on 264 for 5 with nearly six overs remaining. (Cricinfo scorecard)

==== Table at 17 July ====
totesport League – Division Two at 17 July 2005
Pos	Team	Pld	W	L	NR	T	Pts
1	Sussex Sharks	8	6	1	1	0	26
2	Durham Dynamos	10	5	3	2	0	24
3	Warwickshire Bears	9	5	3	1	0	22
4	Leicestershire Foxes	9	5	4	0	0	20
5	Yorkshire Phoenix	7	4	3	0	0	16
6	Derbyshire Phantoms	9	3	4	1	1	16
7	Kent Spitfires	8	3	4	1	0	14
8	Somerset Sabres	9	3	5	1	0	14
9	Surrey Lions	9	3	6	0	0	12
10	Scottish Saltires	10	2	6	1	1	12

=== Mid-week game ===
==== Derbyshire v Durham (20 July) ====
Durham (4pts) beat Derbyshire (0pts) by six wickets

Derbyshire Phantoms were set back initially by three wickets from 22-year-old Graham Onions and that prevented them running away to a big score. Despite Travis Friend making 52 and Graeme Welch only taking 24 balls for his unbeaten 37, Derbyshire still couldn't post more than 223 for 8, and after shaky initial batting from opener Nicky Peng, Durham Dynamos were guided to the target by 97 from Michael Hussey and 70 from Gordon Muchall. An extra won them the game with eight balls to spare. (Cricinfo scorecard)

==== Table at 20 July ====
totesport League – Division Two at 20 July 2005
Pos	Team	Pld	W	L	NR	T	Pts
1	Durham Dynamos	11	6	3	2	0	28
2	Sussex Sharks	8	6	1	1	0	26
3	Warwickshire Bears	9	5	3	1	0	22
4	Leicestershire Foxes	9	5	4	0	0	20
5	Yorkshire Phoenix	7	4	3	0	0	16
6	Derbyshire Phantoms	10	3	5	1	1	16
7	Kent Spitfires	8	3	4	1	0	14
8	Somerset Sabres	9	3	5	1	0	14
9	Surrey Lions	9	3	6	0	0	12
10	Scottish Saltires	10	2	6	1	1	12

=== Fourth Sunday in July ===
==== Kent v Somerset (24 July) ====
Somerset (4pts) beat Kent (0pts) by eight wickets

The match between Kent Spitfires and Somerset Sabres at St Lawrence Ground was shortened to 16 overs owing to bad weather. Kent were sent in to bat, and lost three early wickets, two to Andy Caddick and one to Richard Johnson, for only 11 runs. Rob Key and Justin Kemp both made 17, and James Tredwell smacked two sixes for his nine-ball 22 as Kent came back to 90 for 6, which was still below six runs an over. Tredwell also took two for 19 with his off breaks, but Graeme Smith hit nine fours as he made his way to an unbeaten 56, and James Hildreth won the match for Somerset with a six off Tredwell, with 20 balls potentially remaining in their chase. (Cricinfo scorecard)

==== Scotland v Leicestershire (24 July) ====
Leicestershire (4pts) beat Scotland (0pts) by seven wickets

The Scottish Saltires, playing their first National League match following their ICC Trophy victory, fell down to earth brutally at The Grange. Despite Ryan Watson scoring 70 and Dougie Lockhart 42, there was little support, and the Scots only mustered 166 for 9 in 45 overs – Claude Henderson taking three for 25 for Leicestershire Foxes. Skipper Craig Wright bowled eight overs for ten runs, taking the wickets of Tom New and Darren Robinson in quick succession, but it helped little as Darren Maddy survived to make 95 not out and lead Leicestershire to a seven-wicket win with nine overs to spare. (Cricinfo scorecard)

==== Surrey v Sussex (24 July) ====
Sussex (4pts) beat Surrey (0pts) by 48 runs

An interesting match at Guildford was shortened to 22 overs a side due to rain. However, the scores were similar to what could have been in a 45-over game, as Sussex Sharks amassed 219 for 9 – Murray Goodwin top-scoring with 44, while Luke Wright plundered three sixes in a 14-ball 35. The Surrey bowlers all got wickets – except for Ian Salisbury – but also conceded more than seven runs an over. A Surrey Lions side including three debutants – Stewart Walters, Rory Hamilton-Brown and Jake Dernbach – crumbled despite the efforts of Mark Ramprakash who made 63, as they were all out for 171. (Cricinfo scorecard)

==== Yorkshire v Warwickshire (24 July) ====
Warwickshire (4pts) beat Yorkshire (0pts) by seven wickets

Yorkshire Phoenix were tied down by Warwickshire Bears bowlers Dougie Brown and Alex Loudon, as the Phoenix only managed to post 201 for 7 at Scarborough. Brown took one for 32 and Loudon one for 23 off nine overs each, Michael Lumb being restricted to 57 off 86 balls as top scorer for Yorkshire. Two early wickets from Neil Carter also helped the Warwickshire fielding effort. In reply, Carter smacked six sixes and five fours, taking 38 balls to make 65, and Jonathan Trott and Jamie Troughton took Warwickshire to the target with seven wickets and just over seven overs to spare, as Yorkshire's losing streak in the National League was extended to three matches. (Cricinfo scorecard)

==== Table at 24 July ====
totesport League – Division Two at 24 July 2005
Pos	Team	Pld	W	L	NR	T	Pts
1	Sussex Sharks	9	7	1	1	0	30
2	Durham Dynamos	11	6	3	2	0	28
3	Warwickshire Bears	10	6	3	1	0	26
4	Leicestershire Foxes	10	6	4	0	0	24
5	Somerset Sabres	10	4	5	1	0	18
6	Yorkshire Phoenix	8	4	4	0	0	16
7	Derbyshire Phantoms	10	3	5	1	1	16
8	Kent Spitfires	9	3	5	1	0	14
9	Surrey Lions	10	3	7	0	0	12
10	Scottish Saltires	11	2	7	1	1	12

=== Mid-week game ===
==== Kent v Warwickshire (27 July) ====
Warwickshire (4pts) beat Kent (0pts) by three wickets

In a day/night match at St Lawrence Ground, Warwickshire captain Nick Knight sent Kent in to bat, and his South African pace bowler Dewald Pretorius took a flurry of wickets in good bowling conditions. Ending with five for 32, he took the first five wickets of the innings as Kent collapsed to 29 for 5, but South Africans Justin Kemp and Martin van Jaarsveld rebuilt quickly. Despite little support – no batsman apart from himself passed 25 – Kemp made his way to 84 off 93 balls, as Kent scrambled 177 for 9. In reply, Warwickshire got to 19 for 0, but a fiery spell from Martin Saggers yielded three wickets, as Nick Knight, Ian Bell and Jamie Troughton were all dismissed in single figures. Warwickshire's fifth-wicket partners saw off the opening bowling, however, and went after the part-timers instead, in chase of what suddenly looked like a big target of 178.

Alex Loudon rebuilt well, however, with just 20 of his 73 runs coming in boundaries, while his first partner Jonathan Trott failed to hit any runs and probably did the team a favour when he edged a ball from Robert Joseph – cousin of West Indies batsman Sylvester Joseph – behind, gone for 10 off 40 balls. The wicket looked like it was the first of a collapse, however, as Trevor Frost departed shortly afterwards with Warwickshire on 62 for 6. However, Trevor Penney made 42 – including just the one four – in a 77-run partnership with Loudon, and Dougie Brown made an unbeaten 16 at the end to lead Warwickshire home with five balls to spare. (Cricinfo scorecard)

==== Table at 27 July ====
totesport League – Division Two at 27 July 2005
Pos	Team	Pld	W	L	NR	T	Pts
1	Sussex Sharks	9	7	1	1	0	30
2	Warwickshire Bears	11	7	3	1	0	30
3	Durham Dynamos	11	6	3	2	0	28
4	Leicestershire Foxes	10	6	4	0	0	24
5	Somerset Sabres	10	4	5	1	0	18
6	Yorkshire Phoenix	8	4	4	0	0	16
7	Derbyshire Phantoms	10	3	5	1	1	16
8	Kent Spitfires	10	3	6	1	0	14
9	Surrey Lions	10	3	7	0	0	12
10	Scottish Saltires	11	2	7	1	1	12

=== August Bank holiday weekend ===
==== Yorkshire v Kent (31 July) ====
Kent (4pts) beat Yorkshire (0pts) by five wickets

In the mid-table battle in Division Two, Yorkshire Phoenix went down despite an unbeaten 116 from England captain Michael Vaughan. Yorkshire were missing Ian Harvey for this game, and it showed, as no other batsman passed 30 and Vaughan was woefully alone in getting the target up. It was eventually set at 217 for Kent Spitfires, and as Matthew Walker found his rhythm to hit seven fours in an unbeaten 56, Kent got to that target with five wickets and four balls to spare, despite Vaughan's off-breaks yielding two wickets for 42 runs. (Cricinfo scorecard)

==== Sussex v Somerset (1 August) ====
Sussex (4pts) beat Somerset (0pts) by 11 runs

Robin Montgomerie and Matt Prior opened the batting with a partnership of 13, and Murray Goodwin added a further 97 with Montgomerie for the third wicket, as Sussex Sharks made 266 for 3 in their 45 overs. Montgomerie's 132 not out was his highest List A score Somerset Sabres lost wickets regularly, and despite dispatching Mushtaq Ahmed for 70 in 9 overs, they finished on 255 for 9 – Michael Yardy taking four for 26, while Ian Blackwell top-scored for Somerset with 57. (Cricinfo scorecard)

==== Table at 1 August ====
totesport League – Division Two at 27 July 2005
Pos	Team	Pld	W	L	NR	T	Pts
1	Sussex Sharks	10	8	1	1	0	34
2	Warwickshire Bears	11	7	3	1	0	30
3	Durham Dynamos	11	6	3	2	0	28
4	Leicestershire Foxes	10	6	4	0	0	24
5	Kent Spitfires	11	4	6	1	0	18
6	Somerset Sabres	11	4	6	1	0	18
7	Yorkshire Phoenix	9	4	5	0	0	16
8	Derbyshire Phantoms	10	3	5	1	1	16
9	Surrey Lions	10	3	7	0	0	12
10	Scottish Saltires	11	2	7	1	1	12

=== Mid-week game ===
==== Derbyshire v Somerset (3 August) ====
Derbyshire (4pts) beat Somerset (0pts) by 15 runs

Derbyshire Phantoms jumped into fifth in the table thanks to their win over Somerset Sabres, who for the second time in that week conceded more than 260 in 45 overs. Michael Di Venuto slashed 11 fours on his way to 87, and despite two maiden overs from Andy Caddick, Derbyshire made 277 for 5. Carl Gazzard and Malaysian Arul Suppiah gave Somerset a chance of chasing the big total with their 125-run second-wicket stand, but Jonathan Moss took four for 60 with his medium-pace and Andy Gray three for 47 with off breaks. That plunged Somerset to 241 for 9 before Wes Durston made 24 not out to see Somerset to the end of 45 overs – still 16 runs short of victory. (Cricinfo scorecard)

==== Table at 3 August ====
totesport League – Division Two at 3 August 2005
Pos	Team	Pld	W	L	NR	T	Pts
1	Sussex Sharks	10	8	1	1	0	34
2	Warwickshire Bears	11	7	3	1	0	30
3	Durham Dynamos	11	6	3	2	0	28
4	Leicestershire Foxes	10	6	4	0	0	24
5	Derbyshire Phantoms	11	4	5	1	1	20
6	Kent Spitfires	11	4	6	1	0	18
7	Somerset Sabres	12	4	7	1	0	18
8	Yorkshire Phoenix	9	4	5	0	0	16
9	Surrey Lions	10	3	7	0	0	12
10	Scottish Saltires	11	2	7	1	1	12

=== First Sunday in August ===
==== Kent v Surrey (7 August) ====
Surrey (4pts) beat Kent (0pts) by five wickets

Surrey Lions recorded only their fourth win in the National League system this year with a five-wicket win over Kent Spitfires at St Lawrence Ground. Kent, having chosen to bat first, were dismissed by medium-pacer Neil Saker, who took four for 43, and Tim Murtagh, who joined in with three for 28. Jade Dernbach, Ian Salisbury and Nayan Doshi also took a wicket each as Kent finished on 211, with Irish wicket-keeper Niall O'Brien top scoring with 43 – his innings tugged Kent back from 124 for 6. Andrew Hall took three quick wickets as Kent fielded, reducing Surrey to 25 for 3, but Ali Brown's quickfire 65 and Jonathan Batty's 82 turned the match around, and Rikki Clarke hit 35 to take Surrey to the target with nearly four overs to spare. (Cricinfo scorecard)

==== Scotland v Yorkshire (7 August) ====
Yorkshire (4pts) beat Scotland (0pts) by five wickets

Scotland Saltires ran Yorkshire Phoenix close in the National League game at Edinburgh, but failed to capitalise on a good start and were eventually beaten by five wickets. Having been put in to bat, Fraser Watts and Jonathan Beukes paired up for 77 for the first wicket, and Beukes went on to make 78. However, six Scottish batsmen were dismissed in single figures, Deon Kruis took three for 27, and the Scots were limited to 203 for 9. John Blain, who have played internationals for Scotland, turned out for Yorkshire, but conceded 34 runs in five overs. Yorkshire lost an early wicket in Craig White, who was bowled by Yasir Arafat for 2, but with five batsmen going into double figures and Phil Jaques recording 57, the Phoenix made it to the target with 21 balls to spare, despite good figures of two wickets for 23 from Beukes. (Cricinfo scorecard)

==== Sussex v Leicestershire (7 August) ====
Leicestershire (4pts) beat Sussex (0pts) by six wickets

Leicestershire Foxes eked out a last-ball victory over Sussex Sharks to tighten up the title battle in Division Two of the National League. Batting first, Sussex were tied down by Ottis Gibson, as the Barbadian seamer took four for 37 with three maidens in his nine overs. Chris Adams top-scored with 78, while Rana Naved-ul-Hasan blasted 45 off just 31 balls to propel Sussex to a competitive 223 for 8. Sussex fast bowler James Kirtley then bowled a maiden to begin Leicestershire's innings, and had Tom New caught for an eight-ball duck later. However, Darren Maddy and HD Ackerman added 185 for the second wicket, and despite wickets tumbling around him, Ackerman finished on an unbeaten 114, hitting the winning four off the last ball. (Cricinfo scorecard)

==== Table at 7 August ====
totesport League – Division Two at 7 August 2005
Pos	Team	Pld	W	L	NR	T	Pts
1	Sussex Sharks	11	8	2	1	0	34
2	Warwickshire Bears	11	7	3	1	0	30
3	Leicestershire Foxes	11	7	4	0	0	28
4	Durham Dynamos	11	6	3	2	0	28
5	Yorkshire Phoenix	10	5	5	0	0	20
6	Derbyshire Phantoms	11	4	5	1	1	20
7	Kent Spitfires	12	4	7	1	0	18
8	Somerset Sabres	12	4	7	1	0	18
9	Surrey Lions	11	4	7	0	0	16
10	Scottish Saltires	12	2	8	1	1	12

=== Mid-week game ===
==== Surrey v Leicestershire (9 August) ====
Surrey (4pts) beat Leicestershire (0pts) by six wickets

HD Ackerman lifted Leicestershire Foxes to a big target against Surrey Lions at The Oval, having opted to bat first after winning the toss. His 78 gave Leicestershire a good platform after losing the first three wickets for 85, and Paul Nixon and Jeremy Snape both scored with a batting strike rate above 150 to get Leicestershire to 258 for 5. Leicestershire dug out three Surrey wickets early, but a massive partnership between Mark Ramprakash and Ali Brown worth 166 runs turned the match around, and despite Charl Willoughby having Ramprakash caught behind, Brown paired up with Azhar Mahmood to hit Surrey to the target with more than five overs to spare. Brown's 108 not out was off only 63 balls, including sixteen boundaries. (Cricinfo scorecard)

==== Table at 9 August ====
totesport League – Division Two at 9 August 2005
Pos	Team	Pld	W	L	NR	T	Pts
1	Sussex Sharks	11	8	2	1	0	34
2	Warwickshire Bears	11	7	3	1	0	30
3	Leicestershire Foxes	12	7	5	0	0	28
4	Durham Dynamos	11	6	3	2	0	28
5	Yorkshire Phoenix	10	5	5	0	0	20
6	Surrey Lions	12	5	7	0	0	20
7	Derbyshire Phantoms	11	4	5	1	1	20
8	Kent Spitfires	12	4	7	1	0	18
9	Somerset Sabres	12	4	7	1	0	18
10	Scottish Saltires	12	2	8	1	1	12

=== Second Sunday in August ===
==== Derbyshire v Sussex (14 August) ====
Derbyshire (4pts) beat Sussex (0pts) by three runs

Michael Di Venuto made 129 not out, his third one-day century this season, to lift Derbyshire Phantoms to a final score of 232 for 3, which would turn out to be just enough to win the game. Sussex Sharks were looking to win and open a gap at the top of the league, and with ten runs needed with three wickets in hand and at least two overs remaining, it looked like they would coast to victory. However, Rana Naved-ul-Hasan holed out a catch to Jon Moss, Mushtaq Ahmed could add no run from three balls, and in the end, James Kirtley was bowled by Moss on the last ball, with Kirtley needing to hit a boundary to win the game. (Cricinfo scorecard)

==== Somerset v Yorkshire (14 August) ====
Somerset (4pts) beat Yorkshire (0pts) by two runs

In a high-scoring match at The County Ground, Taunton, Matthew Wood and Ian Blackwell both cracked centuries as Somerset Sabres made their way to 345 for 4. Blackwell's 114 came off just 61 balls, with a total of 74 runs in boundaries. Paul Jaques, Ismail Dawood and Michael Wood all made half-centuries, but in the end Yorkshire Phoenix needed 23 to win off the last over, number 11 Deon Kruis facing Blackwell. The first ball was a dot ball, but a six and three fours followed – however, Kruis needed four for the tie and six for the win on the last ball. He couldn't get the ball to the boundary, and Somerset prevailed by two runs. (Cricinfo scorecard)

==== Table at 14 August ====
totesport League – Division Two at 14 August 2005
Pos	Team	Pld	W	L	NR	T	Pts
1	Sussex Sharks	12	8	3	1	0	34
2	Warwickshire Bears	11	7	3	1	0	30
3	Leicestershire Foxes	12	7	5	0	0	28
4	Durham Dynamos	11	6	3	2	0	28
5	Derbyshire Phantoms	12	5	5	1	1	24
6	Somerset Sabres	13	5	7	1	0	22
7	Yorkshire Phoenix	11	5	6	0	0	20
8	Surrey Lions	12	5	7	0	0	20
9	Kent Spitfires	12	4	7	1	0	18
10	Scottish Saltires	12	2	8	1	1	12

=== Mid-week game ===
==== Durham v Leicestershire (16 August) ====
Durham (4pts) beat Leicestershire (0pts) by eight wickets

Durham Dynamos took a vital win in the promotion battle with Leicestershire Foxes. Michael Lewis took four for 13 as Leicestershire could only make 113 at Riverside, with only Darren Robinson passing 20. Neil Killeen and Liam Plunkett also chipped in with two wickets each. Paul Collingwood then slashed 51 not out from number three to guide Durham to the target with 18.4 overs and eight wickets to spare. (Cricinfo scorecard)

==== Table at 16 August ====
totesport League – Division Two at 16 August 2005
Pos	Team	Pld	W	L	NR	T	Pts
1	Sussex Sharks	12	8	3	1	0	34
2	Durham Dynamos	12	7	3	2	0	32
3	Warwickshire Bears	11	7	3	1	0	30
4	Leicestershire Foxes	13	7	6	0	0	28
5	Derbyshire Phantoms	12	5	5	1	1	24
6	Somerset Sabres	13	5	7	1	0	22
7	Yorkshire Phoenix	11	5	6	0	0	20
8	Surrey Lions	12	5	7	0	0	20
9	Kent Spitfires	12	4	7	1	0	18
10	Scottish Saltires	12	2	8	1	1	12

=== Matches of 21–23 August ===
==== Leicestershire v Sussex (21 August) ====
Leicestershire (4pts) beat Sussex (0pts) by five wickets

Leicestershire Foxes recorded their second win over Sussex Sharks in two weeks to close the gap at the top of Division Two of the National League to two points. Having been put in the field by the Sussex captain Chris Adams, Leicestershire grabbed the first four wickets for 44 runs, and despite a 72-run fifth-wicket partnership between Michael Yardy and Carl Hopkinson, Sussex could only muster 186 all out – Dinesh Mongia taking the last two wickets, while conceding 17 from two overs. Mongia also contributed with the bat – after the Sussex bowlers had made things tricky for Leicestershire's top order, reducing them to 27 for 2 and then 103 for 5, Mongia remained at the crease to make 92 at just under a run a ball to see Leicestershire past the target with seven balls to spare. (Cricinfo scorecard)

==== Somerset v Durham (21 August) ====
Somerset (4pts) beat Durham (0pts) by five wickets

Durham Dynamos failed to take the opportunity of taking a lead in Division Two of the National League, as they went down by five wickets at Taunton. Having won the toss, they struggled to hit out initially, Gavin Hamilton recording 22 off 51 balls and 18-year-old Robert Woodman bowling two maiden overs. However, Dale Benkenstein made an unbeaten 60 and Gareth Breese a quickfire 28 as Durham made their way to 222 for 7 in 45 overs, William Durston getting the best figures for Somerset Sabres with two for 32 – admittedly in five overs – while South African Charl Langeveldt took two for 33 in nine overs. The Sabres hit out well chasing the target, Matthew Wood continuing on his good run of form with 76, and Keith Parsons worked well with Durston, adding 83 runs for the sixth wicket to guide Somerset home after Neil Killeen and Gareth Breese had taken two wickets each to set Somerset back to 143 for 5. (Cricinfo scorecard)

==== Leicestershire v Warwickshire (22 August) ====
Match abandoned without a ball bowled; Leicestershire (2pts), Warwickshire (2pts)

Leicestershire Foxes and Warwickshire Bears were looking to fight it out for a spot in the top three, but rain made play impossible at Grace Road, and the teams shared the spoils. (Cricinfo scorecard)

==== Surrey v Kent (22 August) ====
Match abandoned. Surrey (2pts), Kent (2pts)

This game, which was due to be the second and last day-night one-dayer of the season at the Oval, was abandoned because of rain. (Cricinfo scorecard)

==== Warwickshire v Sussex (23 August) ====
Sussex (4pts) beat Warwickshire (0pts) by five wickets

Sussex Sharks opened up a four-point gap after a spell of left-arm spin bowling from Michael Yardy yielded the last six wickets of Warwickshire Bears' innings for 27 runs, the best bowling figures in Division Two of the National League all season. Earlier, Sussex pacer Rana Naved-ul-Hasan had made inroads with three wickets for 25, and it was only the 73-run partnership between Alex Loudon and Michael Powell that got Warwickshire past 100. Yardy's six-for left Warwickshire all out for 169, however, and in the chase Sussex were troubled by Makhaya Ntini's fast bowling as both opening batsmen were removed and Sussex crumbled to 16 for 2. However, Zimbabwean Murray Goodwin scored a solid, two-hour 86 not out, and guided the team to the target, putting on 82 with Robin Martin-Jenkins after spinner Alex Loudon had taken two wickets to set Sussex back to 91 for 5. (Cricinfo scorecard)

==== Table at 23 August ====
totesport League – Division Two at 23 August 2005
Pos	Team	Pld	W	L	NR	T	Pts
1	Sussex Sharks	14	9	4	1	0	38
2	Leicestershire Foxes	15	8	6	1	0	34
3	Durham Dynamos	13	7	4	2	0	32
4	Warwickshire Bears	13	7	4	2	0	32
5	Somerset Sabres	14	6	7	1	0	26
6	Derbyshire Phantoms	12	5	5	1	1	24
7	Surrey Lions	13	5	7	1	0	22
8	Yorkshire Phoenix	11	5	6	0	0	20
9	Kent Spitfires	13	4	7	2	0	20
10	Scottish Saltires	12	2	8	1	1	12

=== Fourth week-end in August ===
==== Scotland v Derbyshire (26 August) ====
Derbyshire (4pts) beat Scotland (0pts) by three wickets (D/L method)

The Scottish Saltires gave Derbyshire Phantoms a good fight at The Grange, but despite three wickets from Ryan Watson and an unbeaten 71 from Fraser Watts Derbyshire still came out on top. Scotland had been put in to bat by Derbyshire captain Luke Sutton, and crashed to 42 for 4 after two wickets from new-ball bowler Graeme Welch, but Watts paired up well with the lower middle order before rain set in. Seven overs were cut off the Scottish innings, leaving them with 38 overs to play, and a bit of hard hitting from Pakistani all-rounder Yasir Arafat lifted them to 179 for 7. More rain cut Derbyshire's chase to 32 overs, and under the Duckworth–Lewis method they were set 161 to win. They looked to be cruising at 120 for 2 after Steve Stubbings had put on 70 with Sutton. Watson then got three wickets and Cedric English two, as the visitors collapsed to 147 for 7, but Stubbings, still at the crease, held his head calm and ended on 75 not out to guide Derbyshire past the target with three balls to spare. (Cricinfo scorecard)

==== Durham v Scotland (28 August) ====
Durham (4pts) beat Scotland (0pts) by 93 runs

Harare-born all-rounder Ryan Watson put in the best all-round effort for Scotland all season, recording Scotland's fourth-highest score of the season with 86 and the best bowling analysis with four for 36, but none of the other players save Paul Hoffmann (conceding 21 runs in nine overs) made any significant contribution, and Durham Dynamos ran away with a 93-run victory. Batting first, Durham made 227 for 7, Gordon Muchall top-scoring with 79 and Gareth Breese upping the scoring-rate with two sixes in an unbeaten 47 off 39 balls near the end. The Scots then lost wickets left, right and centre, crashing to 54 for 6 before Watson and Craig Wright added 77 for the seventh wicket. The run out of Wright precipitated the final collapse, though, as the last four wickets fell for three runs and Scotland were all out for 134. (Cricinfo scorecard)

==== Surrey v Somerset (28 August) ====
Somerset (4pts) beat Surrey (0pts) by five wickets

Surrey Lions made 237 for 7 batting first at The Oval, despite three wickets from Malaysian Arul Suppiah. The stage was set for a bigger score with James Benning and Mark Butcher in with the score 135 for 1, but Suppiah and Ian Blackwell broke through with wickets to prevent high scoring rates towards the end. Somerset Sabres, and in particular Blackwell, were intent on winning this match. Blackwell hit six sixes and seven fours in a lightning-quick 88, adding 120 with James Hildreth for the fourth wicket before his eventual dismissal – to the part-time off spin of Mark Ramprakash. Despite Nayan Doshi getting another wicket, it was too late for Surrey, as Hildreth added 17 with William Durston to see them across the line with five overs to spare. (Cricinfo scorecard)

==== Yorkshire v Derbyshire (28 August) ====
Derbyshire (4pts) beat Yorkshire (0pts) by five wickets

Graeme Welch and Andre Botha tugged Derbyshire Phantoms back to victory from 119 for 5 chasing 220 to win, as the pair shared an unbeaten 102-run partnership at Scarborough after Deon Kruis and Richard Dawson had taken out early wickets. It was Yorkshire Phoenix who batted first, Michael Lumb top-scoring with 69 while Australian Jon Moss dug out four for 28 in his nine overs. Yorkshire finished with 219 for 8, but their bowlers replied well to have Derbyshire on the rack when Travis Friend was run out to leave them on 85 for 4. Fifties from Welch and Botha turned the match around, however, and Derbyshire won by five wickets. (Cricinfo scorecard)

==== Table at 28 August 2005 ====
totesport League – Division Two at 28 August 2005
Pos	Team	Pld	W	L	NR	T	Pts
1	Sussex Sharks	14	9	4	1	0	38
2	Durham Dynamos	14	8	4	2	0	36
3	Leicestershire Foxes	15	8	6	1	0	34
4	Warwickshire Bears	13	7	4	2	0	32
5	Derbyshire Phantoms	14	7	5	1	1	32
6	Somerset Sabres	15	7	7	1	0	30
7	Surrey Lions	14	5	8	1	0	22
8	Yorkshire Phoenix	12	5	7	0	0	20
9	Kent Spitfires	13	4	7	2	0	20
10	Scottish Saltires	14	2	10	1	1	12

=== Mid-week games ===
==== Kent v Yorkshire (30 August) ====
Kent (4pts) beat Yorkshire (0pts) by six wickets

Kent Spitfires made their way to a fairly comfortable victory against Yorkshire Phoenix, who had opted to bat first after winning the toss. However, all the Kent bowlers got at least one wicket, and the Yorkshire batsmen couldn't convert their starts, as six batsmen were out with scores between 10 and 25. Kent's Andrew Hall bowled three maiden overs and took two wickets to end with the best figures of two for 19, but four bowlers grabbed two wickets each as Yorkshire were bowled out for 164. Kent were never seriously threatened in reply, as Hall put on 64 with Darren Stevens for the third wicket, and Justin Kemp had fun at the end to hit 42 not out off just 25 balls and take Kent to victory in just over two thirds of the allotted overs. Yorkshire medium pacer Ian Harvey suffered the most from Kemp's blade, conceding 40 runs in four overs. (Cricinfo scorecard)

==== Sussex v Scotland (30 August) ====
Sussex (4pts) beat Scotland (0pts) by seven wickets

Rana Naved-ul-Hasan's pace bowling was too much to handle for the Scottish Saltires, as they whimpered to 132 all out despite Jonathan Beukes making 51. None of the other batsmen passed 20, as Rana took five for 30 from his nine overs, while James Kirtley bowled tightly to end with a bowling analysis of 8.5–3–8–2. Sussex Sharks strolled to the target in just over half the allotted time, Matt Prior smashing 13 fours and one six in a fifty-ball 69, while Sean Weeraratna took two for 20 for the Scots. (Cricinfo scorecard)

==== Sussex v Surrey (31 August) ====
Sussex (4pts) beat Surrey (0pts) by two wickets

Mushtaq Ahmed sealed a last-ball victory for Sussex Sharks in a closely fought match at The County Ground, Hove, against mid-table languishers Surrey Lions. The visitors had opted to bat first, and lost three early wickets for 40 runs, but a calm rearguard from Mark Ramprakash set the stage for some fours from Azhar Mahmood near the end. Surrey finished on 230 for 6, and got a good start when Azhar dismissed Robin Montgomerie for 0. A quick 42 from Matt Prior, however, gave Sussex hope of chasing the target, and despite wickets falling regularly Sussex kept the required rate below seven an over, with captain Chris Adams keeping the innings together with his unbeaten 110. Mushtaq eventually faced the final ball of the match, and he hit it to the boundary, which gave Sussex the win and extended their Division Two lead to ten points. (Cricinfo scorecard)

==== Kent v Scotland (1 September) ====
Kent (4pts) beat Scotland (0pts) by 144 runs

At St Lawrence Ground, Kent Spitfires inflicted a loss on Scottish Saltires, their seventh successive loss in the National League, as the Scottish bowlers struggled with containing Kent's batsmen and few Scottish batsmen made it into double figures. Lacking all-rounder Ryan Watson and economical bowler Paul Hoffmann, Scotland were in trouble from the outset, and Kent made 259 for 4 in their 45 overs. South Africans Andrew Hall and Justin Kemp made fifties, the latter an unbeaten 65 off 47 deliveries including four sixes. Jonathan Beukes offered some resistance with 35 for the Scots, but once he was caught and bowled by Jamie Tredwell Scotland lost the last six wickets for 32 runs, ending all out for 115. Kent bowlers Tredwell (7.1–1–16–4), Hall (7–2–17–3) and Ryan Ferley (7–0–36–3) all recorded season best bowling analyses. (Cricinfo scorecard)

==== Table at 1 September 2005 ====
totesport League – Division Two at 1 September 2005
Pos	Team	Pld	W	L	NR	T	Pts
1	Sussex Sharks	16	11	4	1	0	46
2	Durham Dynamos	14	8	4	2	0	36
3	Leicestershire Foxes	15	8	6	1	0	34
4	Warwickshire Bears	13	7	4	2	0	32
5	Derbyshire Phantoms	14	7	5	1	1	32
6	Somerset Sabres	15	7	7	1	0	30
7	Kent Spitfires	15	6	7	2	0	28
8	Surrey Lions	15	5	9	1	0	22
9	Yorkshire Phoenix	13	5	8	0	0	20
10	Scottish Saltires	16	2	12	1	1	12

=== First week of September ===
==== Derbyshire v Surrey (4 September) ====
Surrey (4pts) beat Derbyshire (0pts) by eight wickets

Surrey Lions pace bowlers Azhar Mahmood and Tim Murtagh carved through Derbyshire Phantoms' top order at The County Ground, Derby. The hosts crashed to 34 for 6, Murtagh taking four and Azhar two, before Ant Botha and Tom Lungley added 25 in just over half an hour. Lungley remained at the crease for a first-class-like 21, facing 74 balls, but his partners deserted him to leave him not out. On a day of low first-innings scores, Derbyshire's was the lowest with 88, as Murtagh finished with four for 14 and Azhar with three for 20, both from nine overs. James Benning then hit a boundary-filled 53 to guide Surrey to the target in just over a third of the allotted time. (Cricinfo scorecard)

==== Durham v Kent (4 September) ====
Durham (4pts) beat Kent (0pts) by eight wickets

Kent Spitfires had their run of three successive victories broken by Durham Dynamos, never recovering from a woeful start caused by ducks from James Tredwell, Joe Denly and Darren Stevens, as their three first wickets fell for two runs. Michael Carberry, who came in with the score 27 for 4, made 63 with ten fours, but no other batsman passed 30, and Neil Killeen and Gareth Breese shared the last five wickets as Kent crashed to 140. Gavin Hamilton, who made 43, and Jimmy Maher with 70 shared an opening stand of 123, and despite two wickets from Tredwell, Durham eased home in under two thirds of the allotted time. (Cricinfo scorecard)

==== Yorkshire v Leicestershire (4 September) ====
Leicestershire (4pts) beat Yorkshire (0pts) by 133 runs

Leicestershire Foxes were put in to bat at Headingley, and after their top five all passed into double figures, Leicestershire made their way to 251 for 8 as Darren Maddy and Aftab Habib made half-centuries. Yorkshire Phoenix spinner and captain Richard Dawson had three men caught for 41 runs to end with the best bowling figures for Yorkshire. Leicestershire's Ottis Gibson also got three wickets, but at a cheaper rate, as the Phoenix fell to 57 for 7. Dawson hung about with wicket-keeper Simon Guy, but Jeremy Snape ended the innings with two wickets to bowl Yorkshire out for 120. Guy was the only batsman to pass 25, despite batting at nine. (Cricinfo scorecard)

==== Somerset v Warwickshire (5 September) ====
Somerset (4pts) beat Warwickshire (0pts) by four wickets

Jonathan Trott set up Warwickshire Bears for a big total at Taunton, making 112 not out as Warwickshire eased to 278 for 5, also helped by scores in the 40s from Neil Carter, Nick Knight and Trevor Penney. Somerset Sabres scored quickly in reply, Matthew Wood spending 39 balls for his 53 before being bowled by Trott, but at 187 for 6, the odds were long. However, Will Durston and John Francis added 94 for the seventh wicket, as Somerset won with an over to spare. Warwickshire's opening bowler Dougie Brown only bowled two of a possible nine overs, conceding 23 runs. (Cricinfo scorecard)

==== Leicestershire v Derbyshire (6 September) ====
Derbyshire (4pts) beat Leicestershire (0pts) by six wickets

In a low-scoring match at Grace Road, Leicestershire Foxes could take little advantage out of winning the toss and batting first. Two wickets from Derbyshire Phantoms' Australian all-rounder Jon Moss sent Leicestershire struggling to 42 for 4, and only an attritional partnership between Aftab Habib and Darren Robinson carried them past 100. Paul Nixon and Jeremy Snape hit the singles reasonably well, but at the end of 45 overs, Leicestershire had only managed 164 for 8. Steve Stubbings and Michael Di Venuto gave Derbyshire a good start in the reply, adding 62 for the first wicket, and despite Stubbings and Chris Bassano falling in successive overs, Derbyshire were never troubled. A well-paced chase finished on 168 for 4 with five overs potentially remaining. (Cricinfo scorecard)

==== Table at 6 September 2005 ====
totesport League – Division Two at 6 September 2005
Pos	Team	Pld	W	L	NR	T	Pts
1	Sussex Sharks	16	11	4	1	0	46
2	Durham Dynamos	15	9	4	2	0	40
3	Leicestershire Foxes	17	9	7	1	0	38
4	Derbyshire Phantoms	16	8	6	1	1	36
5	Somerset Sabres	16	8	7	1	0	34
6	Warwickshire Bears	14	7	5	2	0	32
7	Kent Spitfires	16	6	8	2	0	28
8	Surrey Lions	16	6	9	1	0	26
9	Yorkshire Phoenix	14	5	9	0	0	20
10	Scottish Saltires	16	2	12	1	1	12

=== Matches of 11–14 September ===
==== Yorkshire v Durham (11 September) ====
Durham (4pts) beat Yorkshire (0pts) by seven wickets

Gordon Muchall's maiden List A century, an unbeaten 101 off 107 balls, boosted Durham Dynamos to their third straight one-day victory, gaining them promotion from Division Two. Yorkshire Phoenix batted first, however, and fifties from Michael Lumb and the in-form Anthony McGrath gave them a total of 237 for 6, despite Callum Thorp bowling seven overs for only 22 runs. Yorkshire got off to a good start when bowling, having Gavin Hamilton caught for 5, but without Tim Bresnan and Deon Kruis, Yorkshire struggled to take wickets, and Durham won with ten balls to spare. (Cricinfo scorecard)

==== Derbyshire v Yorkshire (14 September) ====
Derbyshire (4pts) beat Yorkshire (0pts) by five wickets

Yorkshire Phoenix won the toss and chose to bat, and immediately lost both openers at Derby. That set the pace of the innings, and seven maiden overs were bowled out of the total of 45. Jonathan Moss got the best bowling figures for the hosting Derbyshire Phantoms, removing Rich Pyrah and Simon Guy in successive balls and ending with bowling figures of 9–2–27–3. Moss' two wickets set Yorkshire back to 66 for 7, and only a rearguard between Joe Sayers, who made 54 not out in two hours, and David Lucas saw them bat out the allotted overs. The pair added 65 for the ninth wicket as Yorkshire closed on 171 for 9. Derbyshire lost Michael Di Venuto for 1 early on, but despite Anthony McGrath removing Hassan Adnan for 57 and Luke Sutton for 34, Derbyshire made it to the target with fourteen balls. Extras were the second-highest scorer, with 43, including 31 wides. (Cricinfo scorecard)

==== Warwickshire v Surrey (14 September) ====
Warwickshire (4pts) beat Surrey (0pts) by 68 runs

Warwickshire Bears hammered the Surrey Lions' bowlers at Edgbaston, which resulted in the Bears recording 292 for 8 batting first. Neil Carter set that pace, taking eleven fours in a blitzing thirty-ball 51 – his fourth half-century in List A cricket. Jade Dernbach had him caught, however, but that did not stop Warwickshire, as Jamie Troughton slashed five sixes and six fours before brothers Tim and Chris Murtagh combined to remove him for 82 – caught Chris, bowled Tim. However, Troughton had added 144 with Jonathan Trott, and not even four late wickets from Rikki Clarke could stop the flow of runs, and both Jade Dernbach and Azhar Mahmood conceded 61 in their nine overs. Surrey had six batsmen going into double figures in their reply, but no partnership was worth 50, as Jamie Anyon and Trott got three wickets each. Extras were the second highest scorer, with 32, behind Clarke's 42. (Cricinfo scorecard)

==== Table at 14 September 2005 ====
totesport League – Division Two at 14 September 2005
Pos	Team	Pld	W	L	NR	T	Pts
1	Sussex Sharks	16	11	4	1	0	46
2	Durham Dynamos	16	10	4	2	0	44
3	Derbyshire Phantoms	17	9	6	1	1	40
4	Leicestershire Foxes	17	9	7	1	0	38
5	Warwickshire Bears	15	8	5	2	0	36
6	Somerset Sabres	16	8	7	1	0	34
7	Kent Spitfires	16	6	8	2	0	28
8	Surrey Lions	17	6	10	1	0	26
9	Yorkshire Phoenix	16	5	11	0	0	20
10	Scottish Saltires	16	2	12	1	1	12

=== Penultimate round ===
==== Durham v Somerset (18 September) ====
Durham (4pts) beat Somerset (0pts) by five wickets

Durham Dynamos bowled first and used the ball to good effect against the Somerset Sabres at the Riverside Ground, with Neil Killeen and Paul Collingwood getting three wickets each. Seven Somerset batsmen were caught, as Somerset lost their first nine wickets for 94, before Wesley Durston and Simon Francis added a 46-run last-wicket partnership. Killeen conceded only 15 runs in his nine overs. Durston also took two for 21 following his 46 with the bat, but 40 from Gordon Muchall saw Durham to the target with nearly 15 overs to spare, giving them promotion in the National League as well – their second promotion of the week. (Cricinfo scorecard)

==== Kent v Sussex (18 September) ====
Sussex (4pts) beat Kent (0pts) by 61 runs

Sussex Sharks were put in to bat at St Lawrence Ground, and although they lost nine wickets, they still managed 230 runs in their 45 overs. Chris Adams and Robin Montgomerie put on 111 for the second wicket after Matt Prior was caught behind for 4, and although five wickets fell for 42 in a period which saw them to 209 for 8, Carl Hopkinson and Mushtaq Ahmed added 21 for the ninth wicket. Kent Spitfires' innings started with losing Neil Dexter for a five-ball duck, bowled by James Kirtley, and Robin Martin-Jenkins had three men caught as Kent lost their first five wickets for 48. Despite 51 from Michael Carberry Kent never got anywhere near the target, Kirtley taking the final wickets as Kent finished on 169. (Cricinfo scorecard)

==== Scotland v Warwickshire (18 September) ====
Warwickshire (4pts) beat Scotland (0pts) by five wickets

Warwickshire Bears kept their promotion hopes alive with a win over Scottish Saltires, although the Scots kept them at bat for 41.4 overs at their home ground, The Grange. Fraser Watts and Ian Stanger both hit half-centuries for Scotland, as the Saltires made their way to 177 for 1, and despite two wickets from Jamie Anyon and the golden duck from West Indian Vasbert Drakes, the Scots ended on 220 for 5. However, Jonathan Trott and Nick Knight shared a swift 109-run stand for the second wicket to see Warwickshire to 151 for 1, and Knight made his 29th List A century as Warwickshire won by five wickets. Drakes, playing in his first match for Scotland, got two wickets for 30 on Scotland debut, while Ian Stanger got two for 26. (Cricinfo scorecard)

==== Warwickshire v Yorkshire (20 September) ====
Warwickshire (4pts) beat Yorkshire (0pts) by 102 runs

Yorkshire Phoenix conceded 309 for 3 after winning the toss and fielding first at Edgbaston despite Scotsman John Blain taking two early wickets to leave the hosts Warwickshire Bears at 49 for 2. Jonathan Trott and Ian Bell struck 216 runs together, with Bell being the most destructive – he hit eight fours and five sixes in an 84-ball century, and added a further 37 before Yorkshire wicket-keeper Simon Guy finally had him stumped. With Jamie Troughton smacking three sixes and two fours in a 13-ball 34, Warwickshire made 309 for 3 in their 45 overs, the sixth highest total in Division Two this season. Yorkshire attempted the chase, with Michael Wood and Anthony McGrath hitting at just under a run a ball, but after McGrath's dismissal Yorkshire lost five wickets for 34, and only just managed to bat out their 45 overs, scoring 207 for 9. Alex Loudon and Neil Carter took three wickets each. (Cricinfo scorecard)

==== Table at 20 September 2005 ====
totesport League – Division Two at 20 September 2005
Pos	Team	Pld	W	L	NR	T	Pts
1	Sussex Sharks	17	12	4	1	0	50
2	Durham Dynamos	17	11	4	2	0	48
3	Warwickshire Bears	17	10	5	2	0	44
4	Derbyshire Phantoms	17	9	6	1	1	40
5	Leicestershire Foxes	17	9	7	1	0	38
6	Somerset Sabres	17	8	8	1	0	34
7	Kent Spitfires	17	6	9	2	0	28
8	Surrey Lions	17	6	10	1	0	26
9	Yorkshire Phoenix	17	5	12	0	0	20
10	Scottish Saltires	17	2	13	1	1	12

=== Final round ===
==== Leicestershire v Kent (25 September) ====
Leicestershire (4pts) beat Kent (0pts) by 40 runs on the Duckworth–Lewis method

Leicestershire Foxes recorded 280 for 5 batting first at Grace Road, with captain HD Ackerman leading from the front with 78. Half-centuries also came from Darren Maddy and Dinesh Mongia, while the medium pace of Neil Dexter yielded two wickets – but conceded 33 runs in five overs. Kent Spitfires got off to a good start, with Darren Stevens hitting twelve fours and a six in his 76 – adding 106 with Martin van Jaarsveld. However, once rain shortened their innings to 33 overs and their target from 281 to 211, they failed to keep up with the required rate, ending with 170 for 6 with England Under-19 player Stuart Broad taking two for 35. (Cricinfo scorecard)

==== Somerset v Derbyshire (25 September) ====
Somerset (4pts) beat Derbyshire (0pts) by 135 runs

Derbyshire Phantoms failed to carry their momentum from the Championship match earlier in the week, and fell to Somerset Sabres and the all-round effort of Ian Blackwell to lose all hopes of promotion. The Sabres were put in to bat, and after Matthew Wood and James Francis added 100 for the first wicket, Blackwell stepped in to bat. He hit 75, the same number of runs as Keith Parsons from number 5, and Somerset closed on 300 for 6. Derbyshire batsmen Ben France and Hassan Adnan started to build towards the target of 301 to win with an 81-run partnership for the second wicket, but both of them were stumped off Blackwell, and he also had three men caught off his bowling to end with five for 26. Malaysian Arul Suppiah also took two for 23, and two run outs left Derbyshire all out for 165. (Cricinfo scorecard)

==== Surrey v Scotland (25 September) ====
Surrey (4pts) beat Scotland (0pts) by eight wickets (Duckworth–Lewis method)

The Scottish Saltires' bowed out of the National League with a loss, to end their three-year spell in the English domestic competition with eight wins, four no-results, one tie and 41 losses. Surrey's opening bowlers Tim Murtagh and Mohammad Akram reduced them to 40 for 5, but 21-year-old Omer Hussain made 52 in his first List A innings, adding 125 for the seventh wicket with Craig Wright, who ended unbeaten on 88. Jade Dernbach took the four last wickets, ending with four for 36, while Akram took two for 19 in his nine overs as Scotland posted 212 for 9. Surrey's innings was shortened by three overs, and their target by nine runs, and thanks to 80 from Scott Newman and 51 from Jonathan Batty they got 204 for 2 after only 30.3 of the allotted 42 overs. (Cricinfo scorecard)

==== Sussex v Yorkshire (25 September) ====
Sussex (4pts) beat Yorkshire (0pts) by eight wickets

Sussex Sharks sealed the National League Division Two title by fielding first and bowling Yorkshire Phoenix out for 99. Only wicket-keeper Simon Guy passed 20, as Yorkshire fell in two periods – first to 37 for 5 thanks to three wickets from Luke Wright, and then, after Guy, Anthony McGrath and Mark Cleary had taken them to 90 for 6, they lost their last four men for nine runs. Sussex captain Chris Adams took his time in the reply, using 83 balls to hit 49 as Sussex' batsmen rode home to an eight-wicket victory.

==== Warwickshire v Durham (25 September) ====
Durham (4pts) beat Warwickshire (0pts) by eight wickets on the Duckworth–Lewis method

Early wickets and few runs early on meant that Warwickshire Bears posted 187 for 8 at their home ground, Edgbaston. Australian Brad Williams took two wickets for the Durham Dynamos, as Warwickshire lost their first four wickets of 43, and despite a run-a-ball 48 from number 8 Dougie Brown, Warwickshire never got the run rate up above 4.5 an over. Durham lost Gordon Muchall for 3, but half-centuries from Australian Jimmy Maher and England all-rounder Paul Collingwood put Durham to a score of 135 for 2, and Durham passed the revised target of 154 with 17 balls to spare. (Cricinfo scorecard)

==== Final table ====
2005 totesport League – Division Two
Pos	Team	Pld	W	L	NR	T	Pts
1	Sussex Sharks	18	13	4	1	0	54
2	Durham Dynamos	18	12	4	2	0	52
3	Warwickshire Bears	18	10	6	2	0	44
4	Leicestershire Foxes	18	10	7	1	0	42
5	Derbyshire Phantoms	18	9	7	1	1	40
6	Somerset Sabres	18	9	8	1	0	38
7	Surrey Lions	18	7	10	1	0	30
8	Kent Spitfires	18	6	10	2	0	28
9	Yorkshire Phoenix	18	5	13	0	0	20
10	Scottish Saltires	18	2	14	1	1	12
