= Scottish Saltires in 2005 =

Scottish Saltires
2005 season
- Captain: Craig Wright
- Ground(s): The Grange, Edinburgh

The Scottish Saltires in 2005 are playing in the Second Division of the totesport League, in what will be their last season in the English one-day league. They will also compete for a World Cup place in the ICC Trophy and in the first-class ICC Intercontinental Cup.

They suffered the disappointment of their first Sunday League game, against Durham being abandoned without a ball being bowled. On 5 May they were then unceremoniously dumped out of the C&G Trophy by Worcestershire. Heavy totesport League defeats followed against Kent, Somerset, Surrey and Sussex, but they recovered to win their second game of the season in a fine effort at Taunton against Somerset. That was followed up by a tie against Derbyshire and a 19-run defeat against Leicestershire, the latter match being much less closely contested than the scoreline suggests. Returning to the National League against Leicestershire, they lost by seven wickets to stay bottom of the National League, and August started with another loss, to Yorkshire. A crowd-pleaser against the Australian cricket team was rained off, and a week later the team endured four National League losses within the space of a week. Then there were two weeks off, before the team continued on their losing ways against Warwickshire, and they also lost to Surrey to end the season.

== Players ==
- Yasir Arafat
- John Blain*
- James Brinkley
- Dougie Brown*
- Asim Butt
- Kyle Coetzer*
- Stuart Coetzer
- Gordon Goudie
- Cedric English
- Gavin Hamilton*
- Majid Haq
- Paul Hoffmann
- Steven Knox
- Douglas Lockhart
- Gregor Maiden
- Dewald Nel
- Colin Smith
- Simon Smith
- Ian Stanger
- Ryan Watson
- Fraser Watts
- Greig Williamson

*These players play for other teams in the totesport League

== Tables ==
=== totesport League ===
2005 totesport League – Division Two
| Pos | Team | Pld | W | L | NR | T | Pts |
|---|---|---|---|---|---|---|---|
| 1 | Sussex Sharks | 18 | 13 | 4 | 1 | 0 | 54 |
| 2 | Durham Dynamos | 18 | 12 | 4 | 2 | 0 | 52 |
| 3 | Warwickshire Bears | 18 | 10 | 6 | 2 | 0 | 44 |
| 4 | Leicestershire Foxes | 18 | 10 | 7 | 1 | 0 | 42 |
| 5 | Derbyshire Phantoms | 18 | 9 | 7 | 1 | 1 | 40 |
| 6 | Somerset Sabres | 18 | 9 | 8 | 1 | 0 | 38 |
| 7 | Surrey Lions | 18 | 7 | 10 | 1 | 0 | 30 |
| 8 | Kent Spitfires | 18 | 6 | 10 | 2 | 0 | 28 |
| 9 | Yorkshire Phoenix | 18 | 5 | 13 | 0 | 0 | 20 |
| 10 | Scottish Saltires | 18 | 2 | 14 | 1 | 1 | 12 |

== totesport League ==
=== Scotland v Durham (1 May) ===
Match abandoned - Scotland (2pts), Durham (2pts)

This match, which was due to be played at The Grange, Edinburgh, was rained off without a ball being bowled. (BBC news)

=== Scotland v Worcestershire (4–5 May) ===
Worcestershire beat Scotland by 10 wickets to progress to Round Two of the C&G Trophy

The first day at The Grange saw no play because of rain. After losing the toss, Scotland were put in, and the bowlers immediately made it very difficult for Scotland. It took them six overs to make their first ten runs, and every time they tried to accelerate, they lost wickets. In the end, they could only muster 134 all out in 46.5 overs. Vikram Solanki and Stephen Moore made this target look easy, passing the required 135 runs without losing a wicket in 5 balls fewer than 20 overs. Both batsmen made half-centuries. (Cricinfo scorecard)

=== Scotland v Kent (8 May) ===
Kent (4pts) beat Scotland (0pts) by 93 runs (D/L method)

Kent Spitfires demolished the Scottish Saltires at their home ground in a rain-haunted match. Winning the toss and bowling, Scotland didn't quite get the wickets they wanted, the South African Martin van Jaarsveld top-scoring for Kent with 57 while Darren Stevens smashed 51 off 30 balls towards the end. Scotland's innings was frequently interrupted by rain and Darren Stevens' bowling - he took five for 32, his first career five-for, as Scotland crawled to 134 all out in 32.2 overs - 94 short of the adjusted target, coincidentally exactly the same as Kent had made, but shortened by seven overs. (Cricinfo scorecard)

=== Scotland v Somerset (11 May) ===
Somerset (4pts) beat Scotland (0pts) by 16 runs

Somerset Sabres won thanks to a slogging effort by all-rounder Ian Blackwell who rescued them from a potentially dangerous position at Edinburgh. Winning the toss and batting, Scottish Saltires' bowlers Asim Butt, Majid Haq and Paul Hoffmann (who bowled 9 overs for 14 runs) tied the visitors down to 145 for 5 before Blackwell came on. Blackwell then proceeded to slam everything out of sight, smacking six sixes and seven fours in his 86 and lifting Somerset to 264 for 7. Colin Smith was the star of Scotland's reply, making 67, but they were never seriously in the chase, especially after Andy Caddick removed Pakistani all-rounder Yasir Arafat and Smith. (Cricinfo scorecard)

=== Scotland v Surrey (20 May) ===
Surrey (4pts) beat Scotland (0pts) by 5 wickets

Scottish Saltires batted first at The Grange in Edinburgh. Jonathan Beukes, their South African import put on 91 from 86 balls as Scotland scored 252 for 7, their highest score of this National League season. Surrey had lost all 4 one-day league games before this match, and when they were reduced to 90 for 3, another defeat seemed on the cards. However, Graham Thorpe took 69 from 89 balls and Ali Brown 65 from 45 to give Surrey their first points with 6.3 overs to spare. (Cricinfo scorecard)

=== Warwickshire v Scotland (29 May) ===
Scotland (4pts) beat Warwickshire (0pts) by one wicket

A poor pitch at Stratford-on-Avon, and some lacklustre batting saw the Warwickshire Bears record their second loss in the National League, as they crumbled to 113 all out on their home ground. Australian-born Paul Hoffmann took three for 19 for Scotland Saltires, but all the Scottish bowlers chipped in with wickets, and it was in fact a good recovery from Warwickshire as they were 17 for 5 and 48 for 7. In reply, Dougie Lockhart and South African Jonathan Beukes recorded good partnership to lift Scotland to 70 for 1, but a burst of wickets from Heath Streak turned the match again, as Scotland lost four wickets for 20 runs. However, Hoffmann saw Scotland across the line, smashing a six off Neil Carter to win the match by one wicket. Extras were the second-highest scorer, with 28, as Warwickshire conceded 20 wides. (Cricinfo scorecard)

=== Yorkshire v Scotland (30 May) ===
Yorkshire (4pts) beat Scotland (0pts) by 60 runs

Despite four Yorkshire Phoenix run outs, and four maidens from Paul Hoffmann, the hosts still managed to score 214 all out in the first innings at Headingley, Anthony McGrath making 57 from number five. Scotland Saltires then crumbled to 154, former England all-rounder Craig White taking three Scottish wickets as only the hired-in man from Durham, Gavin Hamilton, managed some resistance with the bat. Hamilton, who had played ODI cricket for Scotland at the 1999 World Cup, made 60, but he was one of only two Scots to pass 20. Yorkshire continued their promotion charge, however, as they jumped ahead of Somerset in the table and into second place. However, after this match, Yorkshire only won one of their remaining fourteen games. (Cricinfo scorecard)

=== Scotland v Sussex (10 June) ===
Sussex (4pts) beat Scotland (0pts) by 8 wickets

Scotland had a bad week. First, Asim Butt, the leading Scottish seam bowler was banned for a year after testing positive for ecstasy. They then went down heavily to Sussex Sharks at The Grange in their last home game before the 2005 ICC Trophy in three weeks' time. The Saltires batted first and lost wickets regularly. Only Colin Smith, with 61, made any sort of score as they were dismissed for 172. The Sharks chased down the target easily, as openers Matt Prior and Ian Ward put on 108, and whilst Scotland were able to take two wickets, Sussex sped home with 16.3 overs to spare. (Cricinfo scorecard)

=== Somerset v Scotland (17 June) ===
Scotland (4pts) beat Somerset (0pts) by 15 runs

Only a couple of days ago, the lads from Somerset had beaten Australia's finest by five wickets, chasing the highest score in one-day matches. Now, they failed to chase down 233 set by the Scottish Saltires, after Jonathan Beukes smashed 92 and Yasir Arafat supplied with a 20-ball 32 including two sixes. It started well enough for Somerset, Graeme Smith continuing his fine form with 74, leading his team to 158 for 4. But then, the wheels fell off. Paul Hoffmann snared the important wicket of James Hildreth for 49, the lower order rolled over meekly to Arafat (who got 3-33), and with Jon Francis injured, the Sabres managed to lose the match by 15 runs as they were all out for 218. (Cricinfo scorecard)

=== Derbyshire v Scotland (19 June) ===
Derbyshire (2pts) tied with Scotland (2pts)

The first tie of the National League season at The County Ground, Derby was another positive experience for the Scottish Saltires a week before they travelled to Ireland to participate in the ICC Trophy. Derbyshire Phantoms won the toss and batted, and it was only thanks to a century from Australian import Michael di Venuto that they passed 200 and ended up with a final total of 220 for 8 - along with 33 not out from Andre Botha. Scotland's reply was hampered by Kevin Dean who took three early wickets to reduce the Scots to 31 for 3, but Douglas Lockhart made his highest career score with 88 not out to set Scotland back on track. On the last ball, Scotland needed two runs to win with South African-born number 11 Dewald Nel on strike - he could only scamper one with Lockhart, and the teams shared the spoils. (Cricinfo scorecard)

=== Leicestershire v Scotland (20 June) ===
Leicestershire (4pts) beat Scotland (0pts) by 20 runs

The Scottish Saltires threw away a good bowling performance at Grace Road against Leicestershire Foxes. Winning the toss and batting first, Leicestershire only made 208 for 7, none of the batsmen passing fifty but seven finishing in double figures. Dewald Nel took three for 39 for the Scots, but nine overs of Charl Willoughby was evidently too much for the Saltires. He conceded 12 runs, taking two wickets and bowling three maidens in the process, and was a major factor as Scotland imploded to 78 for 6. Despite number 10 Greg Maiden making 35, Scotland were all out for 188 with an over remaining. (Cricinfo scorecard)

== ICC Trophy ==
Scotland then competed in the 2005 ICC Trophy in Ireland. The Trophy is a competition played by associate and affiliate members of the International Cricket Council. 12 teams, including Scotland, qualified for the finals. The top 5 teams win places in the 2007 cricket World Cup and official One Day International status from 1 January 2006 until the 2009 ICC Trophy. Scotland won their first five games, against Oman, Canada, Papua New Guinea, Namibia and the Netherlands saw them through to the semi-finals, the World Cup and ODI status. Immediately, Scotland contacted England to see if they could arrange an ODI with them. They also defeated Bermuda in the semi-finals and Ireland to lift the ICC Trophy for the first time in their history.

== totesport League - post-ICC Trophy-resumption ==
=== Scotland v Leicestershire (24 July) ===
Leicestershire (4pts) beat Scotland (0pts) by seven wickets

The Scottish Saltires, playing their first National League match following their ICC Trophy victory, fell down to earth brutally at The Grange. Despite Ryan Watson scoring 70 and Dougie Lockhart 42, there was little support, and the Scots only mustered 166 for 9 in 45 overs - Claude Henderson taking three for 25 for Leicestershire Foxes. Skipper Craig Wright bowled eight overs for ten runs, taking the wickets of Tom New and Darren Robinson in quick succession, but it helped little as Darren Maddy survived to make 95 not out and lead Leicestershire to a seven-wicket win with nine overs to spare. (Cricinfo scorecard)

=== Scotland v Yorkshire (7 August) ===
Yorkshire (4pts) beat Scotland (0pts) by five wickets

Scotland Saltires ran Yorkshire Phoenix close in the National League game at Edinburgh, but failed to capitalise on a good start and were eventually beaten by five wickets. Having been put in to bat, Fraser Watts and Jonathan Beukes paired up for 77 for the first wicket, and Beukes went on to make 78. However, six Scottish batsmen were dismissed in single figures, Deon Kruis took three for 27, and the Scots were limited to 203 for 9. John Blain, who have played internationals for Scotland, turned out for Yorkshire, but conceded 34 runs in five overs. Yorkshire lost an early wicket in Craig White, who was bowled by Yasir Arafat for 2, but with five batsmen going into double figures and Phil Jaques recording 57, the Phoenix made it to the target with 21 balls to spare, despite good figures of two wickets for 23 from Beukes. (Cricinfo scorecard)

=== Scotland v Australians (18 August) ===
Match abandoned without a ball bowled

A capacity crowd of 4,500 was at The Grange in Edinburgh to watch the local heroes of the Scottish cricket team face off with the world's highest ranked team, Australia. The game was to be a highlight of the Scottish season, with the ground authorities reporting that they could have sold the tickets three times over. The BBC had won the rights to broadcast the match in Scotland, making it the first cricket match to be broadcast on the BBC since 1999.

However, rain poured down steadily, although a buoyant crowd still queued to enter the ground. The weather then first cut the match down to 20 overs and then starting again to prevent any play whatsoever. Although Cricket Scotland had insured against rain, so they were not at a pecuniary advantage, the lack of game represents a lost opportunity to help develop the game north of the English border. (Cricinfo scorecard)

=== Scotland v Derbyshire (26 August) ===
Derbyshire (4pts) beat Scotland (0pts) by three wickets (D/L method)

The Scottish Saltires gave Derbyshire Phantoms a good fight at The Grange, but despite three wickets from Ryan Watson and an unbeaten 71 from Fraser Watts Derbyshire still came out on top. Scotland had been put in to bat by Derbyshire captain Luke Sutton, and crashed to 42 for 4 after two wickets from new-ball bowler Graeme Welch, but Watts paired up well with the lower middle order before rain set in. Seven overs were cut off the Scottish innings, leaving them with 38 overs to play, and a bit of hard hitting from Pakistani all-rounder Yasir Arafat lifted them to 179 for 7. More rain cut Derbyshire's chase to 32 overs, and under the Duckworth-Lewis method they were set 161 to win. They looked to be cruising at 120 for 2 after Steve Stubbings had put on 70 with Sutton. Watson then got three wickets and Cedric English two, as the visitors collapsed to 147 for 7, but Stubbings, still at the crease, held his head calm and ended on 75 not out to guide Derbyshire past the target with three balls to spare. (Cricinfo scorecard)

=== Durham v Scotland (28 August) ===
Durham (4pts) beat Scotland (0pts) by 93 runs

Harare-born all-rounder Ryan Watson put in the best all-round effort for Scotland all season, recording Scotland's fourth-highest score of the season with 86 and the best bowling analysis with four for 36, but none of the other players save Paul Hoffmann (conceding 21 runs in nine overs) made any significant contribution, and Durham Dynamos ran away with a 93-run victory. Batting first, Durham made 227 for 7, Gordon Muchall top-scoring with 79 and Gareth Breese upping the scoring-rate with two sixes in an unbeaten 47 off 39 balls near the end. The Scots then lost wickets left, right and centre, crashing to 54 for 6 before Watson and Craig Wright added 77 for the seventh wicket. The run out of Wright precipitated the final collapse, though, as the last four wickets fell for three runs and Scotland were all out for 134. (Cricinfo scorecard)

=== Sussex v Scotland (30 August) ===
Sussex (4pts) beat Scotland (0pts) by seven wickets

Rana Naved-ul-Hasan's pace bowling was too much to handle for the Scottish Saltires, as they whimpered to 132 all out despite Jonathan Beukes making 51. None of the other batsmen passed 20, as Rana took five for 30 from his nine overs, while James Kirtley bowled tightly to end with a bowling analysis of 8.5-3-8-2. Sussex Sharks strolled to the target in just over half the allotted time, Matt Prior smashing 13 fours and one six in a fifty-ball 69, while Sean Weeraratna took two for 20 for the Scots. (Cricinfo scorecard)

=== Kent v Scotland (1 September) ===
Kent (4pts) beat Scotland (0pts) by 144 runs

At St Lawrence Ground, Kent Spitfires inflicted a loss on Scottish Saltires, their seventh successive loss in the National League, as the Scottish bowlers struggled with containing Kent's batsmen and few Scottish batsmen made it into double figures. Lacking all-rounder Ryan Watson and economical bowler Paul Hoffmann, Scotland were in trouble from the outset, and Kent made 259 for 4 in their 45 overs. South Africans Andrew Hall and Justin Kemp made fifties, the latter an unbeaten 65 off 47 deliveries including four sixes. Jonathan Beukes offered some resistance with 35 for the Scots, but once he was caught and bowled by James Tredwell Scotland lost the last six wickets for 32 runs, ending all out for 115. Kent bowlers Tredwell (7.1-1-16-4), Hall (7-2-17-3) and Rob Ferley (7-0-36-3) all recorded season best bowling analyses. (Cricinfo scorecard)

=== Scotland v Warwickshire (18 September) ===
Warwickshire (4pts) beat Scotland (0pts) by five wickets

Warwickshire Bears kept their promotion hopes alive with a win over Scottish Saltires, although the Scots kept them at bat for 41.4 overs at their home ground, The Grange. Fraser Watts and Ian Stanger both hit half-centuries for Scotland, as the Saltires made their way to 177 for 1, and despite two wickets from Jamie Anyon and the golden duck from West Indian Vasbert Drakes, the Scots ended on 220 for 5. However, Jonathan Trott and Nick Knight shared a swift 109-run stand for the second wicket to see Warwickshire to 151 for 1, and Knight made his 29th List A century as Warwickshire won by five wickets. Drakes, playing in his first match for Scotland, got two wickets for 30 on Scotland debut, while Ian Stanger got two for 26. (Cricinfo scorecard)

=== Surrey v Scotland (25 September) ===
Surrey (4pts) beat Scotland (0pts) by eight wickets (Duckworth-Lewis method)

The Scottish Saltires' bowed out of the National League with a loss, to end their three-year spell in the English domestic competition with eight wins, four no-results, one tie and 41 losses. Surrey's opening bowlers Tim Murtagh and Mohammad Akram reduced them to 40 for 5, but 21-year-old Omer Hussain made 52 in his first List A innings, adding 125 for the seventh wicket with Craig Wright, who ended unbeaten on 88. Jade Dernbach took the four last wickets, ending with four for 36, while Akram took two for 19 in his nine overs as Scotland posted 212 for 9. Surrey's innings was shortened by three overs, and their target by nine runs, and thanks to 80 from Scott Newman and 51 from Jonathan Batty they got 204 for 2 after only 30.3 of the allotted 42 overs. (Cricinfo scorecard)
