= Banister (disambiguation) =

Banister may refer to:

- Handrail, a rail that is designed to be grasped by the hand so as to provide safety or support

== People ==
=== Surname ===
- Cyan Banister, American angel investor and entrepreneur
- Guy Banister, FBI agent and private investigator
- Jeff Banister, American former professional baseball player and manager
- John Banister (composer), English musical composer and violinist
- John Banister (lawyer), American Founding Father, lawyer, planter, and slave owner from Petersburg, Virginia
- Scott Banister, American entrepreneur, startup founder, and angel investor

=== Given name ===
- Banister Fletcher (junior), English architect and architectural historian
- Banister Fletcher (senior), English architect and surveyor and Liberal politician who sat in the House of Commons from 1885 to 1886

== See also ==
- Bannister
