= Banester =

Banester is a surname. Notable people with the surname include:

- Gilbert Banester (c. 1445–1487), English composer and poet
- John Bannister (disambiguation), multiple people
- Thomas Banester (by 1529–1571), English politician
