= Keith Bannister =

Keith Bannister may refer to:

- Keith Bannister (footballer, born 1923) (1923–2012), English football right back (Sheffield Wednesday, Chesterfield)
- Keith Bannister (footballer, born 1930) (1930–2016), English football wing half (Birmingham, Wrexham, Chesterfield, etc)
