= William Banister (disambiguation) =

William Banister (1855–1928) was an Anglican missionary.

William Banister may also refer to:

- William Banister (judge) (died 1721), British judge
- William Guy Banister (1901–1964), FBI agent and private investigator

== See also ==
- Billy Bannister (1879–1942), English footballer
- William Banester, MP for Lancaster
