= Miriam Banister =

British supercentenarian (1817–1928)

Miriam Sparks Banister (née Voisey; 19 March 1817 – 9 April 1928) was an English woman, who was one of the earliest recognized supercentenarians.

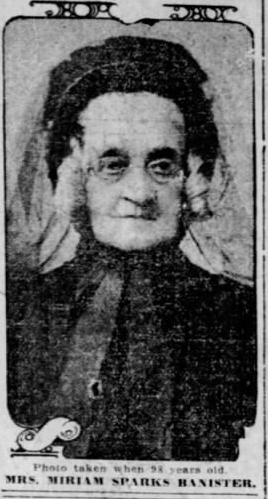
Miriam Sparks Banister photographed at age 98 in 1915, published in 1917 in the St. Louis Post-Dispatch

== Biography ==
Miriam Sparks Voisey was born in Sidmouth and baptised soon after in Salcombe Regis, Devon, England, to John and Hester Voisey. She married contractor John Bodman Banister in London in 1850, at the age of 33. She moved to the United States in 1854. Her daughters Rose and Bertha were born in the United States in 1855 and 1858. She also had two sons, Ferd and Edward. She was widowed in 1878. In St. Louis, she was a member of the Church of St. Philip the Apostle. She had impaired vision from cataracts in old age, and was unable to read.

In her later years, she was consulted for commentary and advice. "The present generation isn't bad, it's just different," she declared in 1925. "And so is everything else in the world." She attributed her longevity and good health to "simple foods, avoidance of overeating and abstinence from worry".

When she died at her home in St. Louis, Missouri, she was 111 years 21 days old. She was never the oldest living person due to the longevity of American woman Delina Filkins. She was congratulated by George V as "the oldest living British subject" shortly before her death.

== See also ==
- Oldest people
- Geert Adriaans Boomgaard
- Margaret Ann Neve
