= Thomas Banister =

Thomas Ban(n)ister or Banester may refer to:

- Thomas Banister (Captain) of Kendenup, Western Australia
- Thomas Banester (died 1571), MP for Reigate
- Thomas Bannister (1799–1874), Australian soldier and explorer
