= Jim Bannister =

English footballer

Personal information
- Full name: James Henry Bannister
- Date of birth: 1 February 1929
- Place of birth: Chesterfield, England
- Date of death: April 2007 (aged 78)
- Place of death: North Yorkshire, England
- Position: Full back

Senior career*
Years	Team	Apps	(Gls)
1950–1952	Chesterfield	0	(0)
1952–1958	Shrewsbury Town	238	(6)
1958–1959	Northampton Town	24	(0)
1959–1961	Aldershot	85	(0)
	Gravesend & Northfleet	?	(?)
Total		347	(6)
- * Club domestic league appearances and goals

James Henry Bannister (1 February 1929 – April 2007), was an English footballer who played as a full back in the Football League.
