= John Banister =

John Banister may refer to:

- John Banister (anatomist) (1533–1610), English anatomist
- John Banister (composer) (1630–1679), English composer
- John Banister (naturalist) (1654–1692), English clergyman and natural scientist
- John Banister (lawyer) (1734–1788), American delegate in the Continental Congress
- John Riley Banister (1854–1918), American law officer and Texas Ranger

== See also ==
- John Bannister (disambiguation)
