= Barbara Banister =

British jewellery designer, painter and silversmith

- Born: 1895; Epsom, England
- Died: 1984 (aged 88–89); Uckfield, Surrey
- Education: Royal College of Art
- Occupations: Jewellery designer, painter, silversmith

Barbara Gillian Banister (1895–1984) was a British jewellery designer, silversmith and painter.

== Biography ==
Banister was born in Epsom to Annie Rita Barrow and Frederick Banister, an architect. After attending Worcester Park School at Westgate-on-Sea in Kent, Banister took private art lessions before entering the Royal College of Art. After a period working for the Hydrographic Department of the Admiralty Banister returned to her art, both as a silversmith making decorative jewellery and as a painter. She was commissioned to paint a portrait of the jockey Lester Piggott winning the 1954 Derby on Never Say Die. Banister had a solo exhibition at Fletching in Sussex during 1958. She exhibited with the Society of Women Artists and in arts and crafts fairs, the British Industries Fair and won a gold medal at the Home Arts and Industries Association exhibition. The Worshipful Company of Goldsmiths holds examples of her work in their art collection at Goldsmiths' Hall in London. She died at Uckfield in Sussex.
