= John Bannister =

John Bannister may refer to:

- John Bannister (actor) (1760–1836), English actor and theatre manager
- John Bannister (philologist) (1816–1873), English philologist
- John Bannister (Wisconsin politician) (1808–1888), 4th mayor of Beloit, Wisconsin
- John Bannister (Wisconsin pioneer, born 1810), 7th mayor of Fond du Lac, Wisconsin

== See also ==
- John Banister (disambiguation)
- Jack Bannister (1930–2016), cricket commentator
