= Keith Bannister (footballer, born 1923) =

English footballer

Personal information
- Full name: Keith Bannister
- Date of birth: 27 January 1923
- Place of birth: Sheffield, England
- Date of death: 13 March 2012 (aged 89)
- Place of death: Rotherham, England
- Position: Right back

Senior career*
Years	Team	Apps	(Gls)
–1945	Sheffield YMCA		
1945–1953	Sheffield Wednesday	75	(0)
1953–1954	Chesterfield	17	(0)
1954–1959	King's Lynn		
1959–1960	Macclesfield	39	(1)
Total		131	(1)
- * Club domestic league appearances and goals

Keith Bannister (27 January 1923 – 13 March 2012) was an English professional footballer who played as a right back in the Football League for Sheffield Wednesday and Chesterfield and in non-League football for King's Lynn and Macclesfield.

== Playing career ==
After starting his career in local football with Sheffield YMCA, Bannister signed for Sheffield Wednesday as a 14-year-old schoolboy in 1937. He graduated to amateur status by 1941 but was then called up for World War II service as an 18-year-old. He served in the Royal Air Force for five years until 1946, despite this he did manage to appear as a guest for York City in the Wartime League, making 24 appearances in 1943. Bannister turned professional with Sheffield Wednesday at the start of February 1945 making his debut in a Wartime League game away at Lincoln City that same month.

On the resumption of official football for the 1946–47 season, Bannister found himself out of the first team making only two appearances that season (making his full League debut on Christmas Day 1946 in a 2–4 away defeat at Bury) and none in the 1947–48 season as Wednesday struggled to make an impact in Division Two. A switch in positions from left half to left back allowed Bannister to force his way into the first team in the 1949–50 season. However a bad injury at Newcastle in February 1951 sidelined him until October when he returned to the side as captain to be ever present for the rest of the 1951–52 season, making 31 League appearances as Wednesday lifted the Division Two championship. The following season in Division One Bannister made only one appearance against Charlton in September 1952 before losing his place to Vin Kenny, that proved to be his final appearance for The Owls and he was transferred to Chesterfield in June 1953 for a fee of £750.

Bannister made 17 appearances during his one season with Chesterfield before dropping down to Non-League football in the summer of 1954 to spend four seasons with King's Lynn . At the end of his time with King's Lynn, Bannister was awarded a benefit match in April 1958 against his old club Sheffield Wednesday. Bannister's final two seasons in football were with Cheshire County League side Macclesfield Town, captaining the side to Cheshire Senior Cup success in 1960.

== After playing ==
Bannister went into insurance after retiring from football in 1960, but in 1961 he returned to football when he was invited to be a coach of Sheffield Wednesday's youth side. He remained a coach a Hillsborough until 1967 when he moved into scouting for new players for the club. When Jack Charlton was appointed Wednesday manager in October 1977, Bannister was appointed as a match analyser and in 1983 he was appointed Sports and Recreation Manager, holding that post until his retirement in 1989. During his retirement he continued to watch Wednesday. He died on 13 March 2012.
