= Jonathan Beukes =

South African cricketer (born 1979)

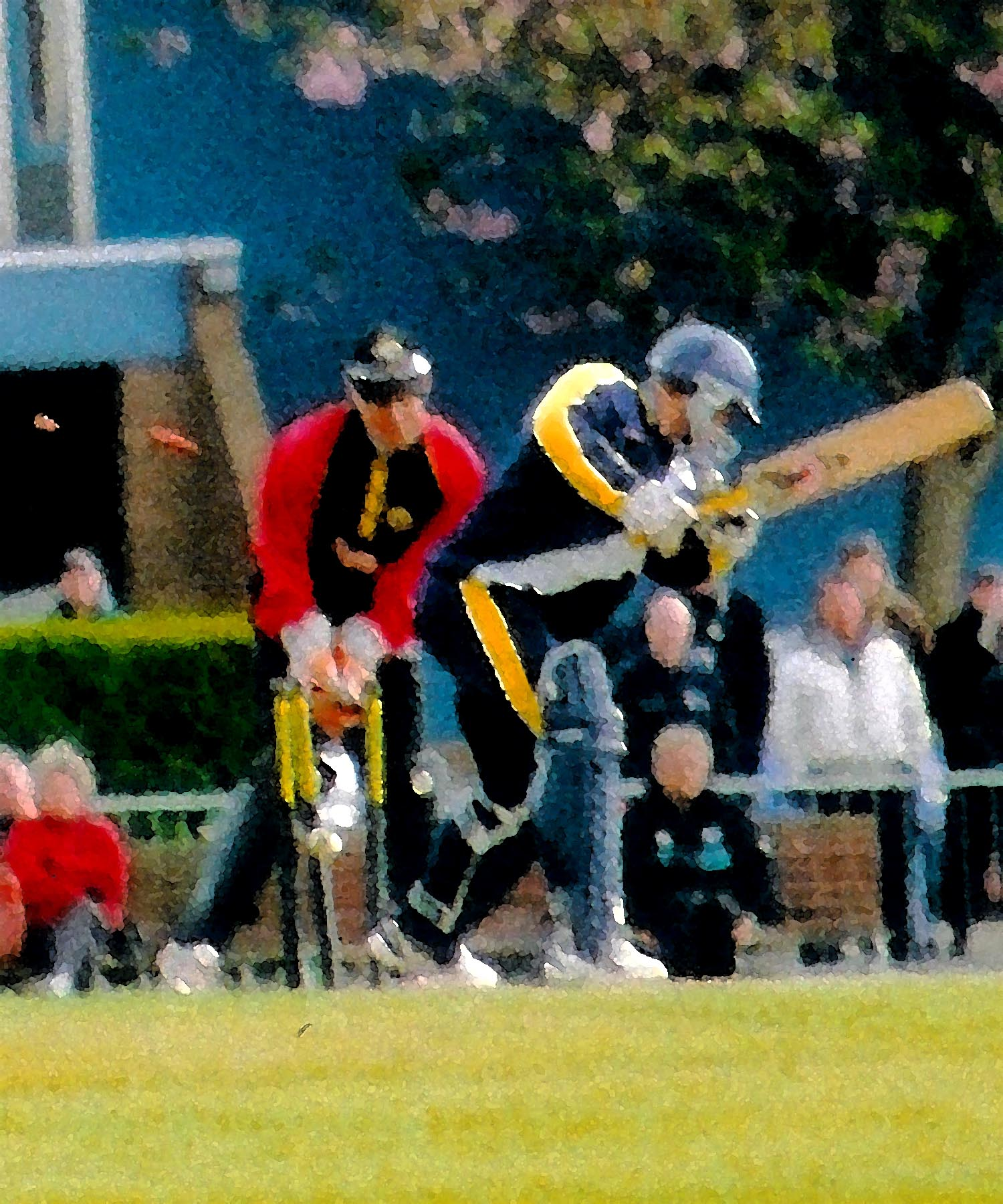
Beukes' dismissal v Kent, May 2005

Jonathan Alan Beukes (born 15 March 1979 in Kimberley, Cape Province) is a South African cricket player who has played for the cricket teams of Free State, Eagles, South West Districts and Scotland.
