= Toss (cricket) =

Coin flip to determine which team bats first

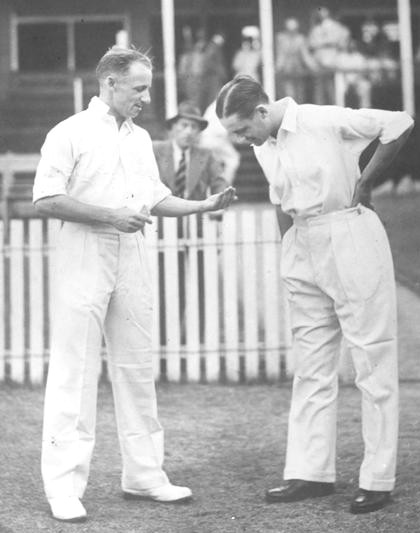
Australian captain Don Bradman (left) and England captain Gubby Allen toss at the start of the 1936–37 Ashes series.

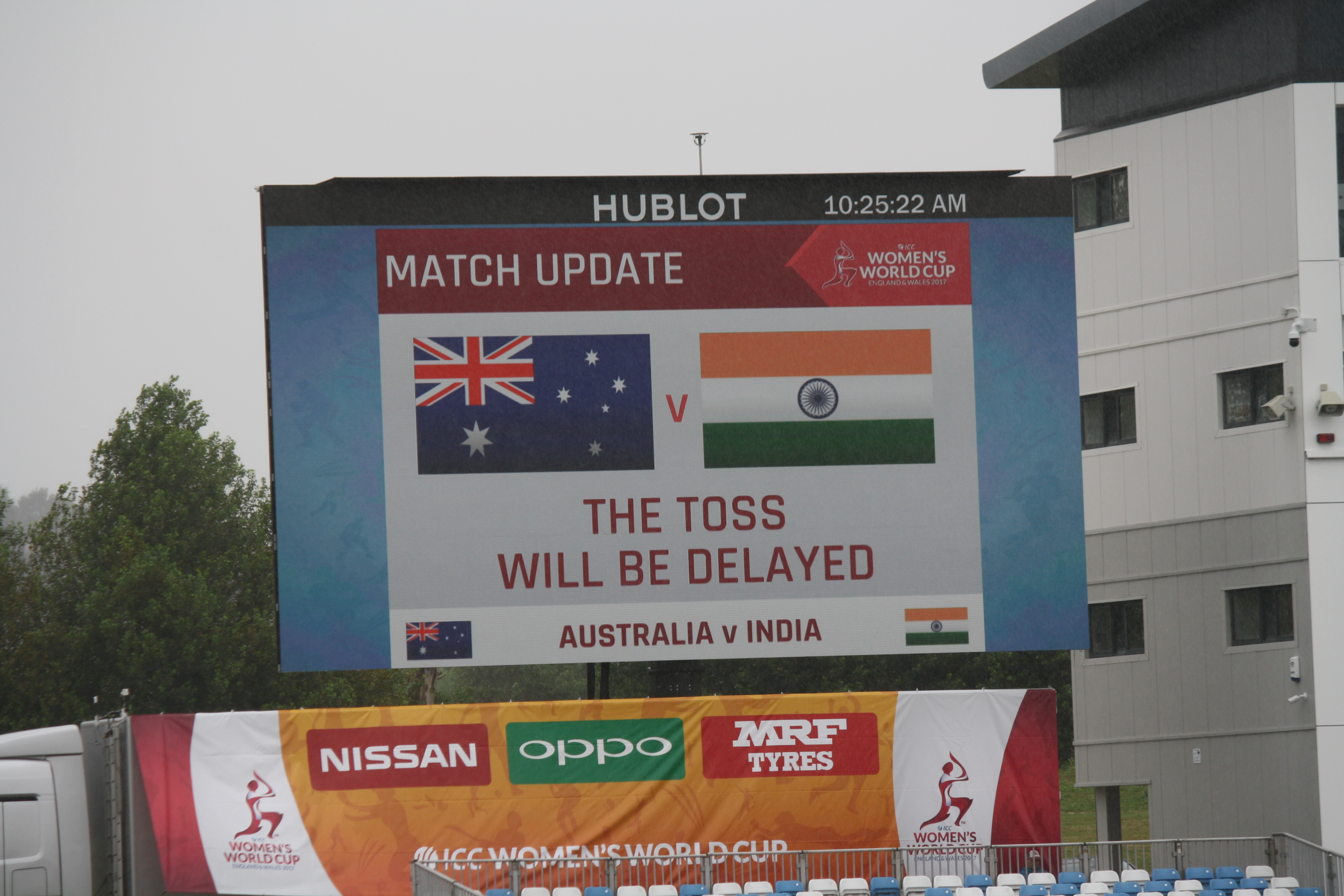
Scoreboard stating the toss is delayed.

In cricket, the toss is the flipping of a coin to determine which captain will have the right to choose whether their team will bat or field at the start of the match.

Before play begins, the captain of each side will inspect the pitch. Based on the pitch and weather conditions, the captains select their final eleven players. If the pitch is soft or dusty, the captain will tend to select more spin bowlers; if the pitch is hard, the choice tends to favor fast bowlers at the expense of spinners.

Half an hour before the start of play, the two captains convene and exchange team selection sheets. This lists the composition of each side, which cannot be changed for the duration of the match, other than in the case of a concussion substitute. Then, with the supervision of the umpires, a coin is tossed to determine which captain will have the right to choose whether to bat or field. The home team's captain tosses the coin while the visiting team's captain calls heads or tails. The decision by the winner off the toss as to whether to bat or bowl first is of great tactical importance, and the captain will have considered many variables before arriving at their decision. Because of the different natures of the games, it is considerably more common to choose to bat second in one-day cricket than it is in Test cricket due to batting conditions being difficult in 4th Innings.

In 2004, the International Cricket Council clarified the definition of when matches have deemed to commence, and stated the toss is the official start of a match. Therefore, a match abandoned at any time after the toss stands as a match played and enters statistical records. If a match is abandoned before the toss, it is not considered to have been played at all and does not count for records. The toss may be delayed, for example, due to bad weather.

The traditional method of the tossing of a coin in test match cricket has been practiced in the 141 years of Test cricket history from the inaugural test match in 1877.

== Scrapping the coin toss ==
In 2018, the International Cricket Council (ICC) proposed the scrapping of the traditional coin toss in Test cricket matches, citing instances when host nations were criticised for, and sometimes found guilty of, changing the pitch conditions to suit themselves when playing this longest format of the game. The ICC proposed instead that the away (visiting) team should be given the right to choose whether to bat first or field first. The ICC announced that this would be implemented in the 2019 Ashes series between Australia and England, giving Australia (the away team) the comparative advantage to either bat first or field first.

In an ICC committee meeting in May 2018, the ICC announced that the traditional method of the coin toss in test cricket would be retained, as it is an "integral part" of the sport that also "forms part of the narrative of the game".

Between 2016 and 2019 in the English County Championship there was no mandatory toss, with the away side having the choice to field first. If the away side declined to field first, the toss still took place.

For the 2018–19 Big Bash League season in Australia, the toss was replaced by a bat flip, with "hills and flats" used instead of heads or tails.

== Batting first ==
If the team is uncertain about the nature of the pitch or simply wants to play safe, they often bat first. If the opposition bowling is strong, batting first is often considered a good option. Sometimes the nature of the pitch deteriorates while the game progresses, making batting more difficult especially if facing spin bowling. Another advantage of batting first is that the batting team sets a target for the team batting second to chase. This can create pressure on the team's batsmen and cause problems for the team batting second.

== Batting second ==
The captain opts to bat second if he is confident that their team can successfully chase any total. Once the target is known, the team does not have to worry about setting a winnable score. The team just has to limit the opposition to a low score, and bat well to successfully chase the target. If the pitch does not deteriorate, batting second is usually a better option. Another advantage of batting second is during day-night One Day International games, played under lights. In some venues, the cricket ball collects a lot of dew in the outfield. This results in a poor grip on the ball by the bowlers. With a moist ball, it is difficult to spin and swing the ball. The difficulty in holding the ball also means that the bowler is more likely to be inaccurate, giving the batsmen more ill-directed deliveries to hit.

== Influence of toss on outcome ==
Winning the toss provides a small, but significant improvement to a team's chances of winning, at least in longer formats of the game at the international level.

Based on the 2,502 Men's Test matches played up to 16 April 2023:

Toss result	Win	Lose	Draw	Tie
Win toss	36.7% (918)	31.8% (795)	31.4% (786)	0.0% (2)
Lose toss	31.8% (795)	36.7% (918)	31.4% (786)	0.0% (2)

Based on the 4567 Men's One Day International matches played up to 16 April 2023:

Toss result	Win	Lose	Tie	No Result
Win toss	48.2% (2200)	47.4% (2165)	0.01% (42)	0.03% (160)
Lose toss	47.4% (2165)	48.2% (2200)	0.01% (42)	0.03% (160)

Based on the 2045 Men's T20I matches played up to 16 April 2023:

Toss result	Win	Lose	Tie	No Result
Win toss	47.6% (974)	48.4% (990)	0.01% (27)	0.03% (54)
Lose toss	48.4% (990)	47.6% (974)	0.01% (27)	0.03% (54)

== History ==
In the first known code of laws published in 1744, the side winning the toss had the choice of the pitch that was to be used as well as whether to bat first. In the 1774 code, this was changed, the visiting team to have the choice of both the pitch and whether to bat first. By about 1809, the modern practice had been adopted, with the choice of pitch left to the umpires and the toss determining which side had the choice of whether to bat first.
