= Bowling analysis =

Cricket analysis

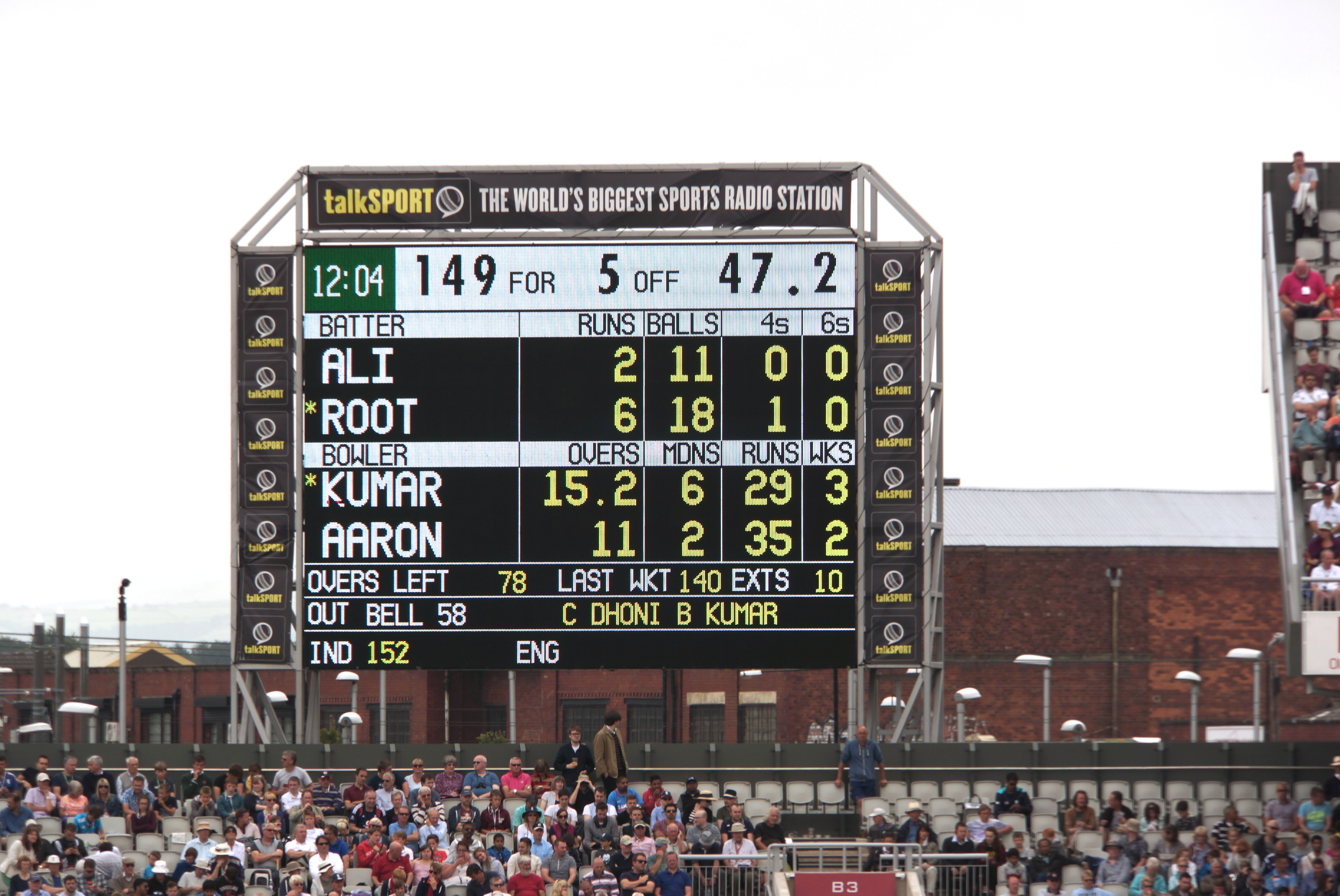
Scoreboard at Old Trafford showing two bowlers' bowling analyses.

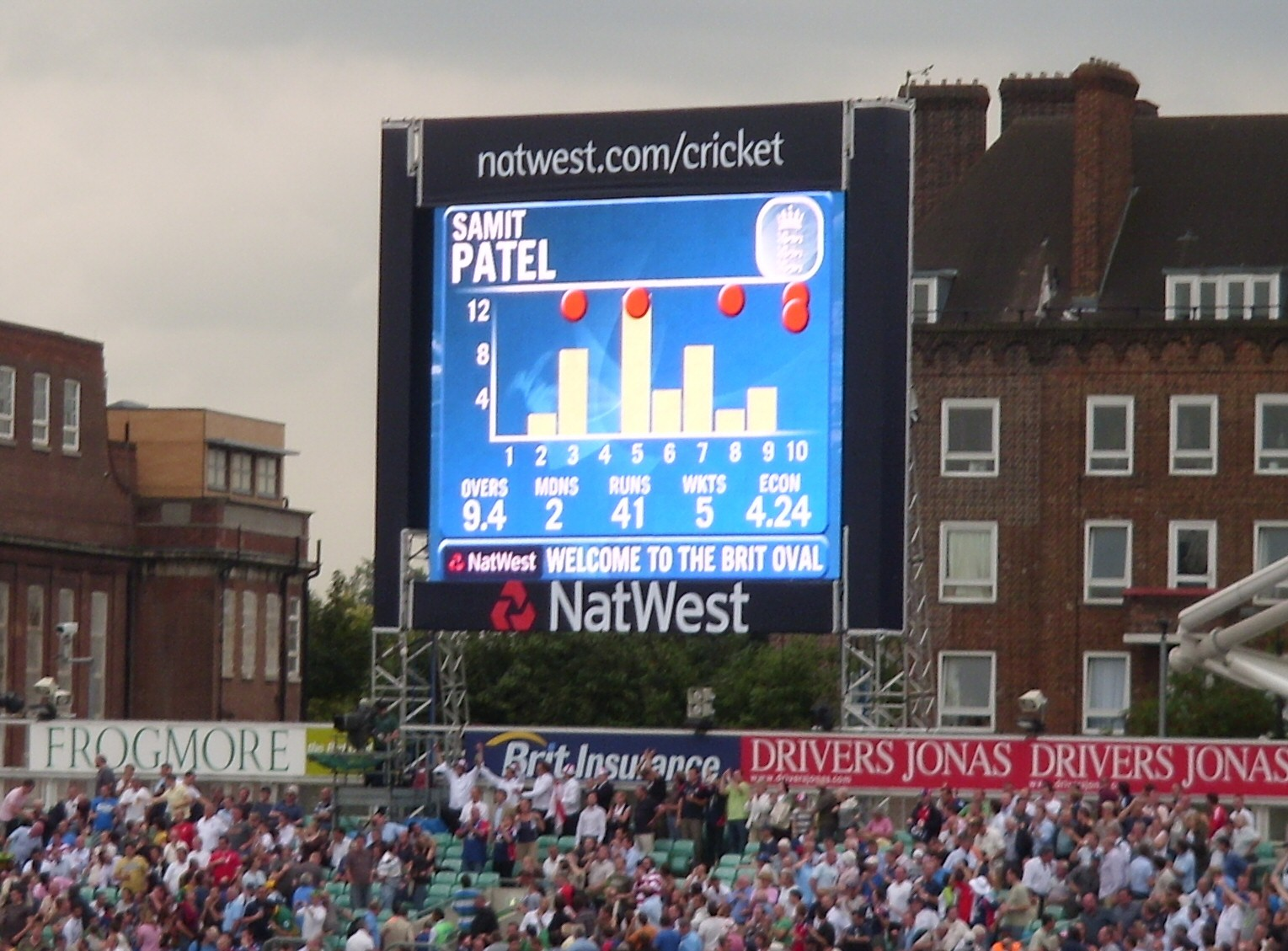
Scoreboard at The Oval showing bowling analysis for Samit Patel.

In cricket, a bowling analysis (sometimes shortened to just analysis, especially in the phrase innings analysis, and also referred to as bowling figures) usually refers to a notation summarising a bowler's performance.

Often their performance is expressed in terms of overs bowled, how many of those overs are maidens (i.e. with no runs conceded), total runs conceded, and number of wickets taken. Bowling analyses are generally given for each innings in cricket scoreboards printed in Wisden Cricketers' Almanack, newspapers and so on, but they are also sometimes quoted for other periods of time, such as a single spell of bowling. Typically, the analysis is given in the following format: Overs – Maidens – Runs conceded – Wickets, such as 15.2–6–29–3.

In some cases, overs and maidens are omitted from bowling figures, and are recorded showing 'Wickets/Runs'; for example, 7/15 by Glenn McGrath against Namibia shows he took 7 wickets for 15 runs.

Sometimes, in limited overs cricket, the 'maidens' figure is replaced by the number of dot balls bowled.

In Test cricket, the best bowling analysis for a single innings is 10/53 by Jim Laker. The best bowling analysis in an ODI is 8/19 by Chaminda Vaas. The best bowling analysis in a Twenty20 International is 6/7 by Deepak Chahar. In first-class cricket, the best bowling analysis for a single innings is 10/10 by Hedley Verity.
