= Extra (cricket) =

Cricket term

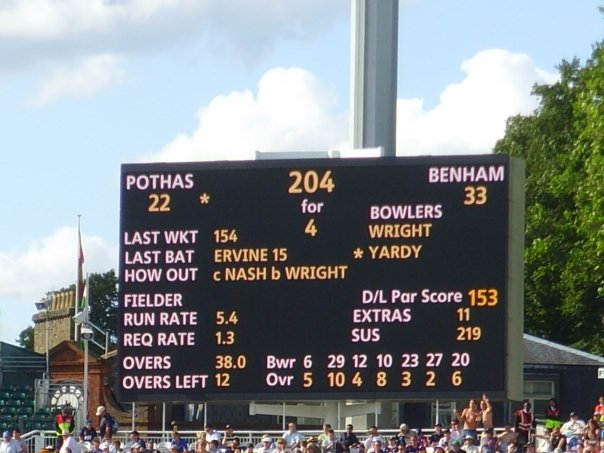
Scoreboard showing extras awarded to the batting team

In cricket, an extra (sometimes called a sundry) is a run scored by, or awarded to, a batting team which is not credited to any individual batter. They are the runs scored by methods other than striking the ball with the bat.

The extras are tallied separately on the scorecard and count only towards the team's score. Giving away many extras is often considered as untidy bowling.

There are five types of extra: no-ball (nb), wide (w or wd), bye (b), leg bye (lb), and penalty run (pen).

== Types of extras ==
=== Illegal deliveries ===
These are extras that are awarded because the bowler or fielders have violated certain rules in how they deliver the ball to the batter (i.e. they are not bowling from far away enough, or the ball is out of the batter's reach), or where they are positioned in the field. Most methods of dismissal can not occur on an illegal delivery. Illegal deliveries do not count towards the completion of the over they occur in, and thus in limited overs cricket, illegal deliveries do not count toward the maximum number of deliveries to be bowled in the innings.

==== No-ball ====
An umpire may call a no-ball when the bowler or fielder commits an illegal action during bowling.

The most common reason for a no-ball is overstepping the popping crease with the front foot. A rarer reason is when the bowler's back foot touches or lands outside the return crease. Other reasons include when a bowler throws (or chucks) the ball (meaning significantly straightening the elbow during the delivery), or bowls a full toss above waist high (a beamer), or for dangerous or unfair short pitched bowling.

The penalty for a no-ball is one run (or, in some one-day competitions, two runs, and/or a free hit); furthermore, the no-ball does not count as one of the six in an over and an extra ball is bowled.

The run awarded for the no-ball is an extra. Any additional runs scored by the batter, whether by running or by a boundary, are included in the individual's score if scored off the bat, or byes or leg byes (whichever is appropriate) if not. These are in addition to the run awarded for the no-ball. If the no-ball would also be a wide, it is only scored once, as a no-ball.

Since the 1980s a no-ball has been scored against the bowler, making the bowling statistics more accurate.

==== Wide ====
A ball being delivered too far from the batter to strike it, provided that no part of the batter's body or equipment touches the ball, is called wide by the umpire. A wide scores one run for the batting team as an extra. Additionally, a wide is not counted as one of the six balls in the over and a replacement is bowled. All wides are all added to the bowler's score.

=== Bye ===
If the ball is not struck by the batter's bat (nor connects with any part of the batter's body) the batters may still run if they choose. If the ball reaches the boundary, whether or not the batters ran, four byes are awarded. Any runs scored are scored as extras.

Byes may be scored from no-balls as well as from legitimate deliveries.

In modern cricket, byes are normally scored against the wicket-keeper in their statistics.

=== Leg-bye ===
If the ball hits the batter's body, then provided the batter is not out leg before wicket (lbw) and the batter either tried to avoid being hit or tried to hit the ball with the bat, the batters may run. In this case, regardless of the part of anatomy touched by the ball, the runs scored are known as leg-byes. If (with the same provisos) the ball reaches the boundary, whether or not the batters ran, then four leg-byes are awarded.

Leg-byes can be scored from no-balls or legitimate deliveries and are scored as extras. The hands holding the bat, and any gloves worn on them, are counted as part of the bat when they make contact with the ball; thus, runs scored off them are credited to the batter and are not leg-byes.

Unlike no-balls and wides, byes and leg-byes are not scored against the bowler.

=== Penalty runs ===
Penalty runs are awarded for various breaches of the Laws, generally related to unfair play or player conduct. Many of these penalties have been added since 2000. Penalties are awarded under Law 41 for Unfair Play and, since 2017, under Law 42 for Players' Conduct.

== Records ==
The most extras in a Test match innings is 76 (35 byes, 26 leg byes, 0 wides, and 15 no balls), conceded by India against Pakistan in the 3rd Test in 2007.

The most extras in a One Day International innings is 59, achieved twice against Pakistan: by West Indies in the 9th ODI in 1989 and by Scotland in the 1999 World Cup.

The most extras in a Twenty20 innings is 45, achieved by Philippines against Indonesia in December 2023.

== See also ==
- Cricket terminology
