= Over (cricket) =

Cricket terminology

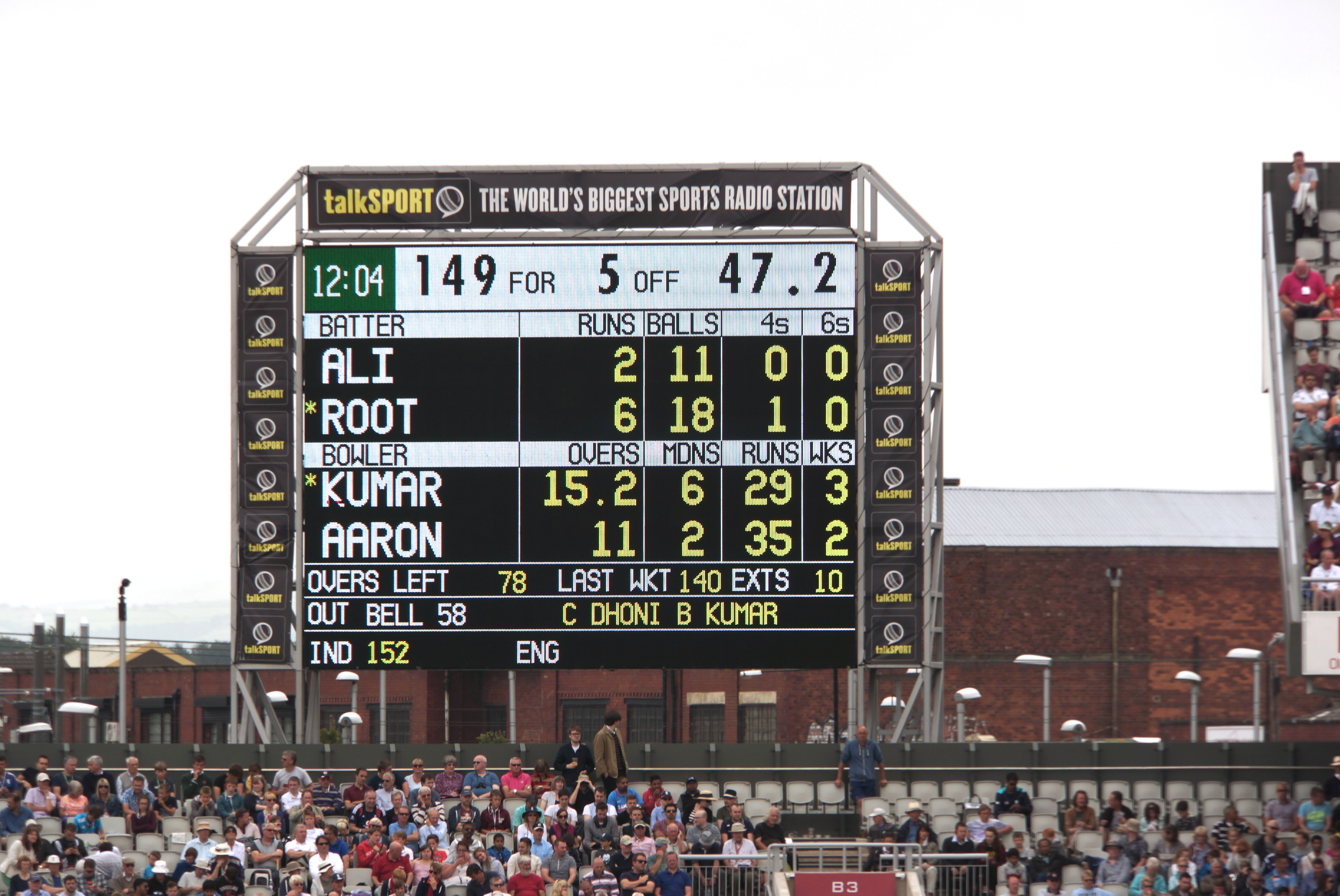
Scoreboard showing the number of overs and maiden overs bowled by two bowlers.

In cricket, an over consists of six legal deliveries bowled from one end of a cricket pitch to the player batting at the other end, almost always by a single bowler.

A maiden over is an over in which no runs are scored that count against the bowler (so leg byes and byes may be scored as they are not counted against the bowler). A wicket maiden is a maiden over in which a wicket is also taken. Similarly, double and triple wicket maidens are when two and three wickets are taken in a maiden over.

After six deliveries the umpire calls 'over'; the fielding team switches ends, and a different bowler is selected to bowl from the opposite end. The captain of the fielding team decides which bowler will bowl any given over, and no bowler may bowl two overs in succession.

== Overview ==
An over consists of six legal deliveries (although overs of different lengths have been used in the past, including four and eight). If the bowler bowls a wide or a no-ball, those deliveries are not counted towards the six-ball tally, and additional delivery must be bowled.

Because a bowler may not bowl consecutive overs, the usual tactic is for the captain to appoint two bowlers to bowl alternate overs from opposite ends. When a bowler tires or becomes ineffective, the captain will replace that bowler with another. The period of time during which a bowler bowls every alternate over is known as a spell.

If, during the middle of an over, a bowler is injured or is removed from the attack by the umpire for disciplinary reasons (such as bowling beamers), another bowler completes the remaining deliveries.

In limited overs cricket, bowlers are usually restricted in the total number of overs they may bowl in a match. The general rule is that no bowler can bowl more than 20% of the total overs in an innings; thus in a 50-over match each bowler can bowl a maximum of 10 overs.

In Test cricket and first-class cricket, there is no limit to the number of overs in a team's innings, nor is there any limit to how many may be bowled by a single bowler. In these matches, there is a requirement to bowl a minimum of 90 overs in a day's play, to ensure a good spectacle, and to prevent the fielding team from wasting time for tactical reasons.

== Tactical considerations ==
=== Tactical considerations in bowling overs ===
The over is a fundamental consideration in the tactical planning of the fielding side. Since a single bowler has only six legal balls to bowl before they must hand the ball to another bowler, the bowler typically plans to use those six balls to set up a pattern of play designed to get a batting player out. For example, they may bowl the first few balls with the same line, length, or spin. The bowler intends to tempt the batting player into scoring runs by providing balls that are relatively easy to hit. If the batting player takes the bait, the bowler can then follow up with a variation designed to hit the wicket, or a ball that is intended to induce a mistake from a batting player who is still in aggressive run-scoring mode, which will result in the batting player being caught out.

Cricket imposes penalties if a team bowls its overs at a very slow over rate, such as fines, loss of competition points, and match bans though there is not a shot clock or pitch clock to bowling in cricket. If a team is proceeding slowly, some captains will choose to use slow/spin bowlers. Such bowlers have a shorter run up so they complete their overs more quickly. Often this means choosing an inferior strategy by employing a less skilful bowler to avoid penalties that are perceived to be greater, such as being banned or losing points.

Bowling a maiden over in ODI and T20 forms of cricket can be difficult as the batting players seek to maximise their scoring opportunities and the rules have restricted field placements that help batters score more easily. If a 0 run over is achieved it can have significant impact on the tactical state of the game.

The final overs in an innings are often described as the "death overs" or "bowling at the death", with bowlers who are said to be particularly skilful at restricting scoring toward the end of an innings often called "death bowlers" in a similar fashion to closing pitchers in baseball. Players who are said to excel in this role include Indian Jasprit Bumrah, Australian Ian Harvey, South African Andrew Hall and New Zealand's Daniel Vettori.

=== Tactical considerations in batting ===
If the two batting players are not similar, tactical considerations may affect their play. If one batting player is stronger than the other, they may attempt to engineer their scoring so that the stronger batting player faces the bowling more often. This is known as farming the strike. It may take the form of the stronger batting player trying to score an even number of runs on early balls in the over and an odd number on the last ball; the weaker batting player will attempt the reverse, and the bowler will try to disrupt this pattern.

If one batting player is right-handed and the other is left-handed, they may try to score odd numbers of runs to disrupt the bowling pattern and tire the fielders by making them reposition themselves frequently.

== Historical number of balls per over in Test cricket ==
Since 1979/80, all Test cricket has been played with six balls per over. However, overs in Test cricket originally had four balls per over, and there have been varying numbers of balls per over around the world up to 1979/80, generally the same as the number of balls per over in force in other first-class cricket in that country.

Prior to the Laws of Cricket (1980 Code), law 17.1 - Number of balls (in the over), did not explicitly specify the number of balls to be bowled in an over, but merely stated that the number of balls should be agreed by the two captains prior to the toss. In practice, the number of balls was usually stipulated in the playing regulations governing the match being played. Although six was the usual number of balls, it was not always the case. From the 1980 code onwards, law 17.1 was amended to read, "The ball shall be bowled from each end alternately in overs of 6 balls".

Balls per over

In England

From	To	Balls per over
1880	1888	4
1889	1899	5
1900	1938	6
1939	1945	8
1946	present	6

In Australia

From	To	Balls per over
1876/77	1887/88	4
1891/92	1920/21	6
1924/25	1924/25	8
1928/29	1932/33	6
1936/37	1978/79	8
1979/80	present	6

In South Africa

From	To	Balls per over
1888/89	1888/89	4
1891/92	1898/99	5
1902/03	1935/36	6
1938/39	1957/58	8
1961/62	present	6

In New Zealand

From	To	Balls per over
1929/30	1967/68	6
1968/69	1978/79	8
1979/80	present	6

In Pakistan

From	To	Balls per over
1954/55	1972/73	6
1974/75	1977/78	8
1978/79	present	6

In India, West Indies, Sri Lanka, Zimbabwe, Bangladesh, the Netherlands, the United Arab Emirates (venue, not host) and Ireland all Test matches have been played with six ball overs.

== See also ==
- Over rate
