= Lost ball =

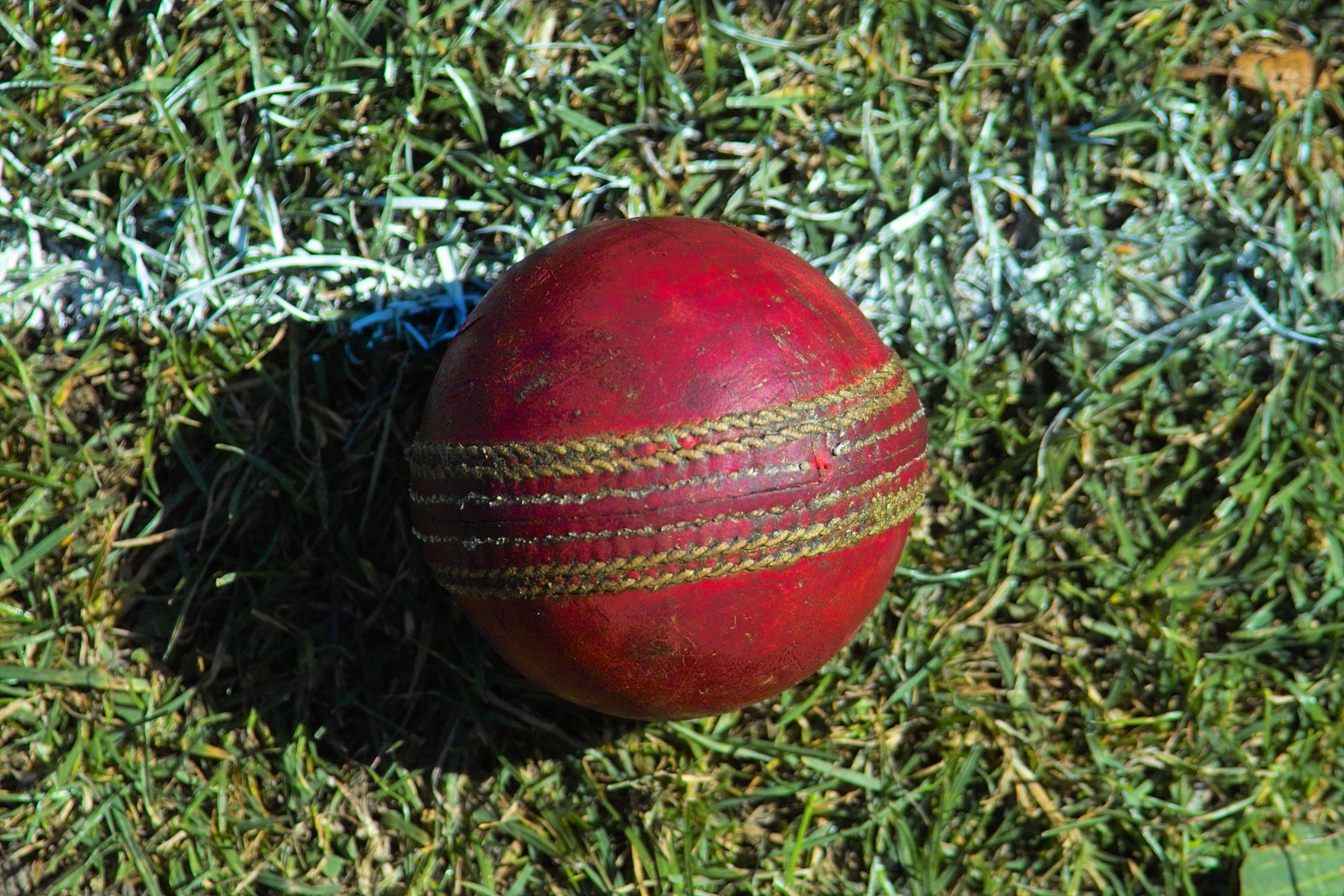
A used cricket ball

The Laws of cricket determine how a lost ball is dealt with.

== Lost ball per 2017 Law changes ==
The 2017 Code of the Laws of cricket state that if the ball can not be found or recovered, the umpire will call and signal Dead ball (Law 20.4.2.10). The ball then ceases to be in play. Any penalties and runs completed plus the run in progress if the batsmen had crossed before the call of Dead ball will be added to the score (Law 18.9). If the batsmen had not crossed they would be returned to the ends that they occupied prior to the incomplete run. For instance if batsman A at the north end crosses batsman B before the call that run will count. If batsman A had not crossed batsman B he would be returned to the north end and that run would not count.

The wear on a ball determines how it behaves in the air and when it pitches. As a result of this, when Dead ball is called, Law 4.5 requires the umpires to replace the ball with one in a similar condition.

== Lost ball prior to 2017 Law changes ==
Before the Laws of cricket were rewritten and reordered in 2017, a different procedure applied which was governed by the old Law 20. Any fielder would be able to call "lost ball" upon which the ball would automatically become dead. The batting team would keeps any penalty that would have been declared if the delivery was not fair (see no-ball and wide) plus the greater of 6 runs, or runs completed plus the run in progress if the batsmen had crossed before the call of 'lost ball' was made.
