= Hit wicket =

Method of dismissal in cricket

Hit wicket is a method of dismissal in the sport of cricket. This method of dismissal is governed by Law 35 of the Laws of Cricket. The striker is out "hit wicket" if, after the bowler has entered his delivery stride and while the ball is in play, his wicket is put down by his bat or his person. The striker may do this whilst preparing to receive or receiving a delivery or in setting off for his first run after playing the delivery. In simple language, if the striking batsman knocks the bails off the stumps or uproots the stumps, while attempting to hit the ball or take off for a run, he is out hit wicket.

This method is the sixth most common method of dismissal after caught, bowled, leg before wicket, run out and stumped. It is significantly rarer than any of these, which constitute the five conventional methods, but still much more common than the other four (timed out, obstructing the field, retired out and hit the ball twice), which are extremely rare.

Although a bowler is given credit for the wicket, it is not a method of dismissal that a bowler actively seeks. A batsman may not be given out "hit wicket" if the ball is not actually delivered by the bowler or if the delivery is a no-ball.

As of November 2025, batsmen have been dismissed hit wicket a total of 164 times in Test cricket, 80 times in One Day Internationals and 44 in Twenty20 Internationals. In the women's game, a player has been dismissed 12 times in this manner in Tests, 9 in women's ODIs, and 27 in women's Twenty20 International matches.

== Notable dismissals ==
Due to the rarity of this method of dismissal, many occurrences in international cricket are notable.

=== Commentary gaffe ===
On 9 August 1991, during a match between England and the West Indies at the Oval, Ian Botham fell over his stumps whilst attempting to hook Curtly Ambrose and so was dismissed "hit wicket". Later in the day, Brian Johnston of BBC Radio's Test Match Special read out the details of the scorecard as normal. When he came to Botham's dismissal, his fellow presenter Jonathan Agnew commented that Botham 'just didn't quite get his leg over'. This was a double entendre meaning that he was not able to avoid hitting his stumps by getting his leg higher than the stumps, and also a reference to sex. Johnston slowly started laughing until he could commentate no more, leaving about a minute of broadcasting being just him in a fit of giggles.

=== Disintegrating bat ===
In the first innings of the 3rd Test in the 1921 Ashes series, at Headingley, Andy Ducat, playing in his only Test for England, fended at a fast ball bowled by Australia's Ted McDonald. Ducat's bat broke, and a splinter flew back and dislodged a bail, the ball being caught behind by a slip fielder. Ducat was given out "caught", although it seems likely that he could also have been given out "hit wicket".

Later in 1921, in the 2nd Test between Australia and South Africa at Old Wanderers in Johannesburg, McDonald dismissed Billy Zulch in a similar fashion, breaking the batsman's bat so that fragments flew back to dislodge a bail, and Zulch was given out "hit wicket".

=== Flying gloves ===
Playing for Derbyshire against Surrey at the Oval in 1953, Alan Revill's hand was hit by a lifting delivery from Alec Bedser. Revill shook his hand in pain, and his glove flew off, hit the stumps, and dislodged a bail. The umpire considered that Revill was still "playing at the ball", and he was dismissed "hit wicket".

=== Falling headgear ===
In Test cricket, a number of batsmen have been out "hit wicket" as a result of headgear falling onto the stumps.

In the 2nd Test between Australia and the West Indies in Melbourne in 1960–61 (the Test immediately after the famous Tied Test at Brisbane), Joe Solomon was first out in the second innings, following on. Playing back to a topspinner bowled by Richie Benaud, his cap fell off and dislodged a bail, so he was out "hit wicket". The Australian crowd thought the dismissal was unsporting, and booed their own side.

In Warwickshire's County Championship match against Hampshire at Edgbaston in 1962, M. J. K. Smith was dismissed when a gust of wind blew his cap on to his wicket.

Two Indian cricketers have been dismissed in a similar fashion – Ashok Mankad by England's Chris Old during the 3rd Test at Edgbaston in July 1974, and Dilip Vengsarkar by Australia's Jeff Thomson during the 1st Test at Brisbane in December 1977.

In the 3rd One Day International between New Zealand and Australia in Dunedin in February 2000, New Zealand's Adam Parore had his helmet knocked off by a short-pitched delivery from Brett Lee. The helmet fell into the stumps, and Parore was also out "hit wicket", causing some disturbance in the crowd.

In the 3rd Test between England and West Indies at Old Trafford on 9 June 2007, Kevin Pietersen was out "hit wicket" when his helmet fell onto the stumps. The bowler was Dwayne Bravo, who bowled a good bouncer that dislodged the helmet. Replays suggested that the force of the ball broke the chinstrap, freeing the lid to strike the stumps.

=== No balls ===
Like most dismissals in cricket, a Hit Wicket cannot occur upon a no-ball. Playing in Brisbane, Australia in the 2001 Tri-Series tournament, West Indian player Ridley Jacobs was given out Hit Wicket in a one-day international against Zimbabwe when a no ball should have been called. Spin bowler Brian Murphy bowled a full & wide delivery that Ridley stepped backward to play off the back foot. In the process he slipped and fell, demolishing the stumps. Neither umpire requested the use of the television third umpire and Jacobs walked off. Side on replays showed that during the delivery Zimbabwe's wicket keeper Andy Flower had clearly placed his hands past the bowling crease which is level with the stumps. This was a breach of Law 27.3 Position of wicket-keeper, and should have resulted in a no-ball with Jacobs not out.

=== Other strange hit wicket dismissals ===
Pakistan's Inzamam-ul-Haq was also out "hit wicket" in the 3rd Test against England at Headingley on 6 August 2006, as he attempted to sweep England spinner Monty Panesar and in doing so lost his balance before falling backwards onto his stumps. He attempted to jump over the stumps, but completely fell on top of them.

One of the more bizarre hit wicket dismissals was of Sri Lanka national cricket team former captain Kumar Sangakkara in the finals of the triangular ODI Compaq Cup against India at Colombo on 14 September 2009, as he attempted a shot and in the follow through his bat slipped out of his hands, flew backwards in the air and landed on the stumps.

On 1 December 2017, West Indian player Sunil Ambris became the first player to be dismissed hit wicket on debut, also getting out for a golden duck. He proceeded to get out the same way in the very next game, becoming the only player to be out this way twice in consecutive games.
