= Free hit =

Delivery in cricket where the batter cannot be dismissed by non-no ball methods

In cricket, a free hit is a delivery to a batter in which the batter cannot be dismissed by any methods other than those applicable for a no-ball, namely run out, hit the ball twice and obstructing the field.

The rule is used in limited overs matches. When a bowler bowls a no-ball, the immediate next ball is a free hit.

== History ==
It came into international cricket in October 2007. Initially only foot fault no-balls resulted in a free hit. From 2015, the rules were changed so that all no-balls result in a free hit.

== Advantage gained ==
The opportunity afforded by a free hit enables a batter to play a more attacking shot, without the fear of getting out by any mode that is credited to the bowler i.e. bowled, caught, LBW, stumped or hit wicket. The only possible modes of dismissal on a free-hit delivery are the same as those applicable on a no-ball: run out, obstructing the field and hit the ball twice.

If the striker is caught or bowled on a free hit, the ball is still in play and the striker can score runs. In case of bowled, the runs would be awarded to the striker if the bat made contact with the ball before hitting the stumps; otherwise, the runs are counted as byes. An instance of the latter happened in an ODI between India and England in January 2017, when Liam Plunkett clean bowled MS Dhoni off a free-hit delivery and the ball rolled away to the boundary, giving India four byes. Another notable instance took place during the 2022 ICC Men's T20 World Cup match between India and Pakistan, in which Virat Kohli ran three byes after being bowled by Mohammad Nawaz off a free-hit delivery.

== Fielding restrictions ==
The fielding team is not allowed to change the field for the free hit ball, if the same batter (who received the original no-ball) is on strike. However, for safety reasons, if the wicketkeeper is standing up at the stumps they are allowed to move back to a more traditional position.

If the batters ran an odd number of runs on the original no-ball, the other batter is now the striker, and the field may be re-positioned for the free hit. In fact re-positioning is also allowed if the striker changes for whatever reason, for example if a new batter replaces a striker who is run out on the original no-ball, by failing to make their ground on the second run. The field must also be re-positioned if the no-ball was called for an illegal field placement.

== Signal ==
The umpire at the bowler's end signals that the next ball is a free hit by making circular movements in the air with one raised hand. The free hit is carried over to the next ball if the original free hit ball is bowled wide or a no-ball; in this case the umpire is required to signal the free hit again.
