= Bouncer (cricket) =

Bowling style

In the sport of cricket, a bouncer (or bumper) is a type of short-pitched delivery, usually bowled by a fast bowler, which bounces once and reaches the batter around shoulder or head height.

== Usage ==
Bouncers are used to push the batter back on to their back foot if they have been freely playing front-foot scoring shots, such as drives. To this end, bouncers are usually directed more or less at the line of the batter's body. Aiming at the batter is legal provided the ball bounces on the pitch; or, when it reaches the batter without bouncing of the pitch (a full toss), the ball is below the batter's waist. Aiming at the batter's head without bouncing on the pitch, known as a beamer, is illegal.

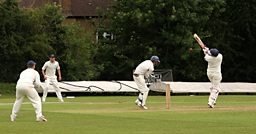
A batter attempting to play a hook shot against a bouncer.

A batter may play a bouncer in either a defensive or an attacking way. If the batter plays it defensively he aims primarily to avoid getting out, and secondarily to avoid being hit by the ball. For a head-high bouncer, these goals are achieved most easily by ducking under the ball. If the ball is at chest height, the batter's best defence is to move on to his back foot, raise his bat vertically to chest height, and attempt to block the ball and direct it downwards to the pitch so as to avoid presenting a catch to a fielder. Sometimes the batter will need to jump into the air to gain the necessary height to defend with the bat. He may also sway out of the way. Given these approaches, the bowler can hope to both intimidate the batter somewhat, and possibly have the ball deflect off the bat at an awkward angle and produce a catch for a nearby fielder.

Bouncer in purple.

Conversely, the bouncer can be a very productive ball for the batter, if he plays it in an attacking manner. The shot that is used to attack the bouncer is the hook shot. To play the hook shot the batter moves his back foot backwards and towards the off side as the ball is being delivered. As the ball approaches, the batter swivels from facing the off side to facing the leg side, while holding the bat horizontally. The batter's aim is to hit the ball at high speed towards, into or over the leg side boundary. However, despite their run-scoring potential, hook shots frequently lead to wickets falling, particularly through balls hitting the top edge of the bat and being caught by leg side fielders. However, if the bouncer is misdirected by the bowler, and reaches the batter on the off side of his wicket, the cut, uppercut or late cut can be played, either with the intention of guiding the ball along the ground, through a gap in the field setting or over the infield for four or six.

There is an unspoken agreement, particularly in the time before the widespread use of batting helmets, that fast bowlers will not bowl bouncers at each other, because less skilled batters are less likely to effectively defend and therefore more likely to be struck. Breaking of this rule can lead to "bouncer wars" – that is, the targeted bowler engaging in retaliatory hostile short-pitched bowling at his opponent during the following innings.

== ICC rules ==
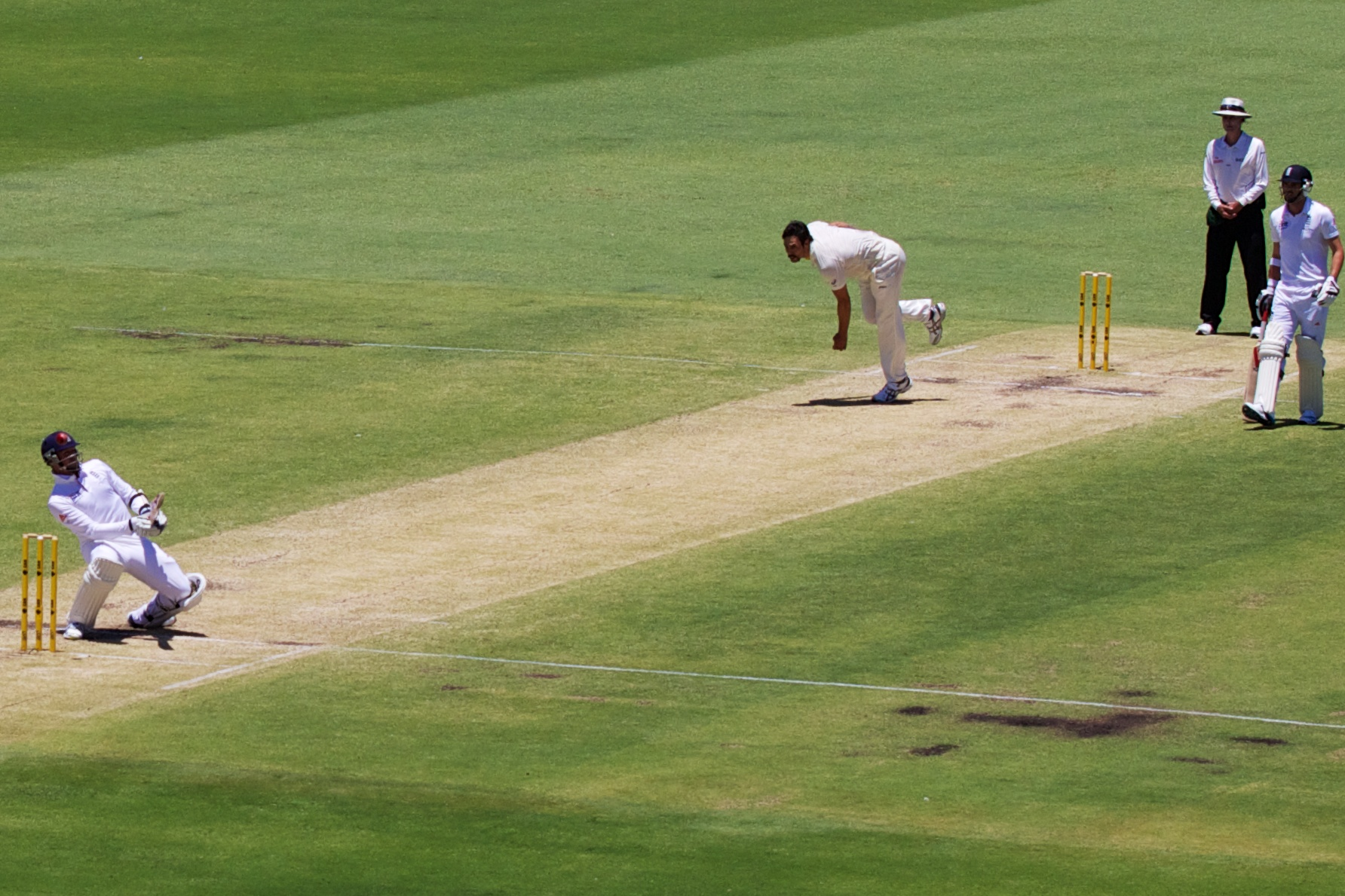
Graeme Swann evades a bouncer from Mitchell Johnson

Because of the potential danger to batters of being hit and to stop bowlers bowling bouncers all the time, there are Laws in the Laws of Cricket governing how frequently a bowler may bowl bouncers, as well as how many fielders may field backward of square leg. These laws take into account the relative skill of the batters.

During the 1970s to 1980s, bouncers were used as part of a team's intimidatory tactics, especially by the West Indies team. In 1991, the International Cricket Council (ICC) introduced a "one bouncer per batter per over" rule in an attempt to discourage the use of intimidation. However, the ruling was not well received by players and umpires alike, with English umpire Dickie Bird describing it as "farcical" as he felt that calling intimidatory tactics should be left to the umpire. The ICC changed it to two bouncers per over in 1994, with a two-run no-ball penalty (rather than one-run no-ball) if the bowler exceeded two bouncers an over. One Day International cricket allowed one bouncer per over in 2001 (and a one-run no-ball in case a bowler exceeded the limit).

On 29 October 2012 the ICC increased the number of bouncers that could be bowled during a One Day International to two per over. The number of bouncers per over allowed in T20s was kept to one.

== Controversies ==
Fast leg theory, the deliberate and sustained bowling of bouncers aimed at the body, coupled with a cordon of legside catching fieldsmen to catch deflections, was a tactic used by England against Australia in 1932/33, dubbed the Bodyline series by the Australians. It caused a sporting and political firestorm between the mother country and the former colony and several incidents threatened to boil over into public riots. This controversial tactic caused the Laws of Cricket to be reformed to prevent any recurrence.

In 1954–55 in Sydney, England fast bowler Frank Tyson bowled bouncers at Australian Ray Lindwall, who returned the favour by hospitalising Tyson with one of his own. An angry Tyson returned with a large lump on his head and took 6/85 in the second innings to give England a 38-run victory.

In 1994 at the Oval Devon Malcolm was hit on the helmet by a bouncer from Fanie de Villiers. The incensed Malcolm told the South Africans "You guys are history" and took apart their second innings with 9/57.

== Injuries and deaths caused by bouncers ==
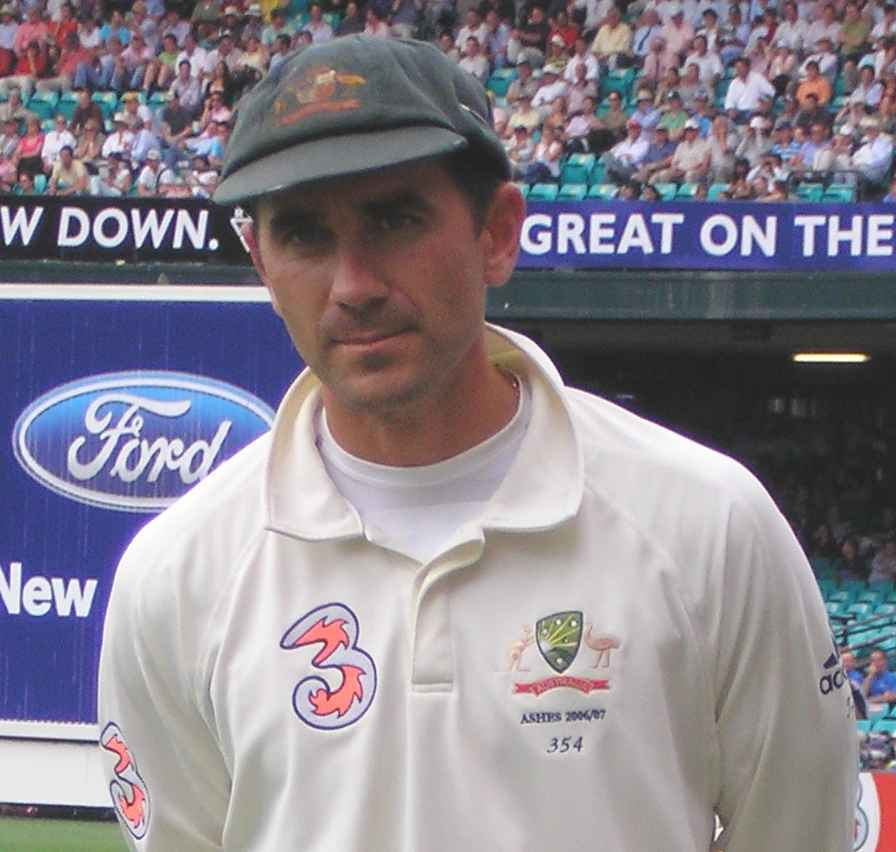
Justin Langer spent time in hospital in 2006 after being struck in the head by a bouncer

The bouncer is an aggressive delivery and the very nature of the delivery by a fast bowler and aimed at the head can lead to batters being hit in the chest, neck or head. While rare, impacts to the top part of the body can cause serious injuries or even death. While the laws of cricket can be used to limit the delivery, particularly when being used against specialist bowlers at the end of the batting order, it is not outright banned like the beamer.

In 1962, Indian captain Nari Contractor was hit above his right ear by a Charlie Griffith bouncer which resulted in severe loss of blood and left Contractor critically ill. He regained full consciousness after six days and returned to first-class cricket ten months later.

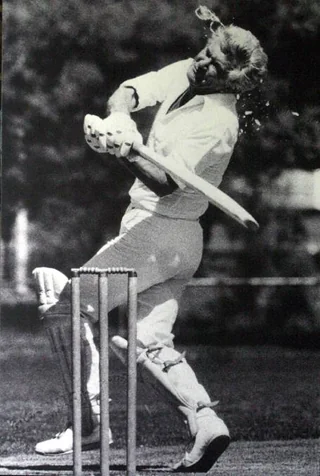
Australian Prime Minister Bob Hawke is struck in the head by a bouncer in 1984, shattering his glasses.

In 1984, during a game between Australian Prime Minister Bob Hawke and his cabinet against the Press Gallery Hawke was struck in the eye by a bouncer from Gary O'Neil, a journalist from The Sydney Morning Herald, who saw Hawke's glasses shatter and him fall to the ground in pain, being removed from the field by his staff. While originally there was fears that, due to the impact of the ball and the shattered glass, Hawke may have lost sight in his right eye, he was soon released from the hospital with bruising and minor cuts, returning to the field several hours later as a spectator. The image of Bob Hawke recoiling from the hit was subsequently circulated in Australian Media.

In 2006, playing in his 100th test, Australian opener Justin Langer was struck on the head by a bouncer from Makhaya Ntini and hospitalised. In 2008 West Indies batter Shivnarine Chanderpaul was knocked out for several minutes after being hit by a bouncer from Australian fast bowler Brett Lee during a test match. Shoaib Akhtar injured both Gary Kirsten (2003) and Brian Lara (2004) with fast bouncers. Both batters had to be taken off the field.

In November 2014, Australian cricketer Phillip Hughes was knocked unconscious by a bouncer from Sean Abbott, which hit the side of his head, between the grille and shell of his helmet, during a Sheffield Shield match. He was taken to hospital in a critical condition, suffering from a subarachnoid haemorrhage, but died from his injuries two days later, never having regained consciousness.

During the semi-final of the 2019 Cricket World Cup, against England, Alex Carey injured his chin from a bouncer bowled by Jofra Archer. The resulting blow knocked the helmet off Carey's head; he caught it mid-air before it could fall onto the stumps, saving himself from dismissal.

During the second test of the 2019 Ashes Series, Australian batter Steve Smith was hit on the neck by a 148.7 km/h (92.4 mph) delivery from England fast bowler Jofra Archer. After retiring concussed, Smith returned to play 45 minutes later. The Australian medical team's decision to let him play was criticised by the brain injury charity Headway, as "incredibly dangerous". Smith's replacement, Marnus Labuschagne, became the first concussion substitute in a Test match.

== See also ==
- Cricket terminology
