= 1835 English cricket season =

Cricket season review

The 1835 English cricket season was the ninth of the roundarm era. (Note: Any match listed in the ACS' Important Match Guide (1981) is historically important, and therefore of the highest standard, whether or not a scorecard might exist. The same applies to numerous matches discovered by researchers since 1981. For further information, see First-class cricket.) Powerless to prevent the use of roundarm bowling, MCC finally amended the Laws of Cricket to make it legal.

The relevant part of the Law stated: if the hand be above the shoulder in the delivery, the umpire must call "No Ball". Bowlers’ hands now started to go above the shoulder and the 1835 Law had to be reinforced in 1845 by removing benefit of the doubt from the bowler in the matter of his hand's height when delivering the ball. The Laws were also changed to enforce a compulsory follow on if the team batting second was 100 runs behind on first innings.

== Important matches ==
1835 match list

== Events ==
Nottinghamshire as a county team, and perhaps also as Notts CCC, played its first inter-county match v. Sussex at Brown's Ground, Brighton on 27 to 29 August. Previous matches involved Nottingham as a town rather than Notts as a county. Notts is recognised as a county team from 1835.

The lease of Lord's Cricket Ground was transferred to JH Dark, who remained proprietor until 1864.

== Leading batsmen ==
James Cobbett was the leading runscorer with 156 @ 15.60.

Other leading batsmen were: EG Wenman, J Taylor, CJ Harenc, CA Wilkinson, CH Parnther, GM Giffard.

== Leading bowlers ==
William Lillywhite was the leading wicket-taker with 42 wickets.

Other leading bowlers were: S Redgate, J Cobbett, T Barker, G Brown, J Broadbridge.

== Bibliography ==
- ACS (1981). A Guide to Important Cricket Matches Played in the British Isles 1709–1863. Nottingham: ACS. OCLC 85045528.
- Haygarth, Arthur (1997) [1862]. Scores & Biographies, Volume 2 (1827–1840). Kennington: Frederick Lillywhite. ISBN 978-19-00592-23-9.
- Warner, Pelham (1946). Lords: 1787–1945. London: Harrap. OCLC 877106024.
