= Hit the ball twice =

Rare method of dismissal in the sport of cricket

Hit the ball twice, or "double-hit", is a method of dismissal in the sport of cricket. It is exceptionally rare at all levels of the game. The law was codified at the very latest by 1744 and had likely been introduced earlier than that due to injuries and deaths occurring from double hit attempts in the 1600s and 1700s. The law prohibits a batter from making a second clear attempt to hit the ball after it has hit their bat or their person for any reason except to stop the ball hitting the stumps.

== Definition ==
Law 34.1 of the Laws of Cricket states:

34.1 Out Hit the ball twice

- 34.1.1 The striker is out Hit the ball twice if, while the ball is in play, it strikes any part of his/her person or is struck by his/her bat and, before the ball has been touched by a fielder, the striker wilfully strikes it again with his/her bat or person, other than a hand not holding the bat, except for the sole purpose of guarding his/her wicket.
- 34.1.2 For the purpose of this Law ‘struck’ or ‘strike’ shall include contact with the person of the striker.

In fairness to the fielding side a second or further strike allows the batter to protect their wicket and nothing further. As with all forms of cricket dismissal, the fielding team is still required to appeal to the umpires.

The only runs that will be allowed after hitting the ball twice are a no-ball penalty if applicable, and any five penalty runs that apply. If the ball is lawfully struck twice, the fielding side is not penalised under Law 28.3 if the ball strikes a helmet properly placed behind the wicket-keeper.

The ball can be caught as long as it does not touch the ground from the moment of the first strike by the bat until it is held by the fielder, and will be recorded as 'Out Caught', which takes precedence over 'Hit the ball twice', and is credited to the bowler and the catcher. 'Obstructing the field' (Law 37.3 Obstructing a ball from being caught) is not so credited, but also takes precedence as the recorded means of dismissal.

If the delivery is a no-ball (including any free hit penalty delivery) the striker can still be out or not out Hit the ball twice under all the same considerations, but they are not expected to take into account the call or fact of no-ball in acting to guard their wicket.

A batter who touches the ball a second time to return it to a fielder is explicitly not out under this Law (34.2.1), but could be out Obstructing the Field under Law 37.4, whilst one who touches the ball after it has been touched by a fielder is explicitly not out under this Law (34.2.2), but could be out under 37.1.

== History ==
Cricket is often considered to be a rather gentle pastime but it has a history of extreme violence. In the early days before the modern rules had universal effect batsmen could go to almost any lengths to avoid being out. They could obstruct the fielders and they could hit the ball as many times as necessary to preserve their wicket. This had fatal consequences on more than one occasion and strict rules were gradually introduced to prevent the batsman from physically attacking the fielders, to keep them at their crease, and only allowing one attempt to hit the ball even if they missed it with the bat the first time.

In 1622, several parishioners of Boxgrove, near Chichester in West Sussex, were prosecuted for playing cricket in a churchyard on Sunday 5 May. There were three reasons for the prosecution: one was that it contravened a local by-law; another reflected concern about church windows which may or may not have been broken; the third was that "a little childe had like to have her braines beaten out with a cricket batt".

The latter situation was because the rules at the time allowed the batsman to hit the ball more than once and so fielding near the batsman was very hazardous, as two later incidents confirm.

In 1624, a fatality occurred at Horsted Keynes in East Sussex when a fielder called Jasper Vinall was struck on the head by the batsman, Edward Tye, who was trying to hit the ball a second time to avoid being caught. Vinall is thus the earliest known cricketing fatality. The matter was recorded in a coroner's court, which returned a verdict of misadventure.

In 1647, another fatality was recorded at Selsey, West Sussex, when a fielder called Henry Brand was hit on the head by a batsman trying to hit the ball a second time.

It is not known when the rules were changed to outlaw striking for the ball a second time or when the offence of obstructing the field was introduced, but both those rules were clearly stated in the 1744 codification of the Laws of Cricket, which were drawn up by the London Cricket Club and are believed to be based on a much earlier code that has been lost.

The first definite record of a batsman being dismissed for hitting the ball twice occurred in the Hampshire v Kent match at Windmill Down on 13–15 July 1786. Tom Sueter of Hampshire, who had scored 3, was the player in question, as recorded in Scores and Biographies.

== Unusual dismissal ==
This method of dismissal is the second rarest after timed out, recorded on 24 occasions in first-class cricket and twice in List A cricket.

The last incident of the dismissal in English cricket occurred in 1906 when John King, playing for Leicestershire against Surrey at The Oval, tried to score a run after playing the ball twice to avoid getting bowled. Had he not tried to score a run, he would not have been out.

Kurt Wilkinson was dismissed in this manner when playing for Barbados against Rest of Leeward Islands in the 2002–03 Red Stripe Bowl. The dismissal was controversial as there was doubt as to whether Wilkinson had "wilfully" struck the ball twice as required under the relevant law of cricket.

The only occurrence of this dismissal in international cricket was when Malta's Fanyan Mughal got out against Romania in the 2023 Men's Continental Cup on 20 August 2023. Mughal missed a pull shot, causing the ball to hit him and land nearby on the ground. He then knocked the ball away with his bat, moving it away from the wicket-keeper, who was running in to collect the ball in order to attempt a run-out of the non-striker (who was well out of his crease). Because of this, Romania appealed and Mughal was given out by the umpires.

In November 2026 during a Nepal Premier League T20 match Sompal Kami could have been given out for hitting the ball twice, but was instead given out for obstructing the field. Kami, captain of the Karnali Yaks was dismissed in the 15th over of the chasing innings after he mishit a very wide delivery from Bipin Khatri. The first strike was an underneath edge that smashed the ball into the ground causing it to bounce up into the air and slightly toward the bowler's end. As it began falling Kami swore and hit the ball again with a reverse grip swing. This second hit also went straight down into the pitch, startling the opposition wicketkeeper who was in the process of moving to collect the ball. There was an appeal and video review and he was given out.

== See also ==
- List of unusual dismissals in international cricket

== External sources ==
- The official laws of cricket
