= Full toss =

Cricket delivery

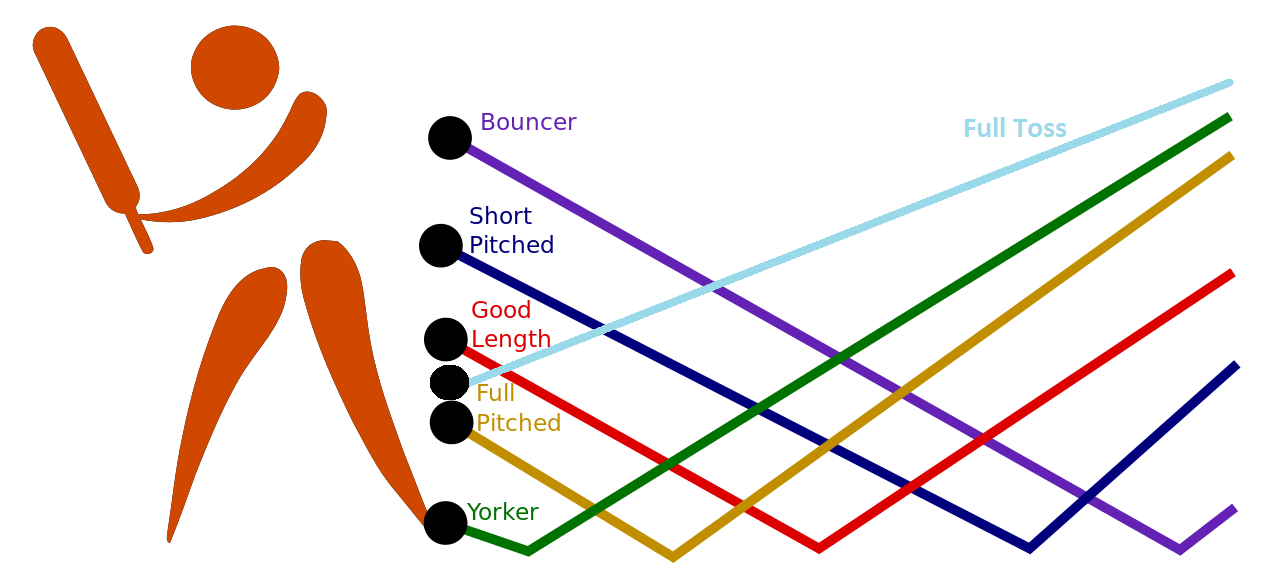
A full toss ball shown in sky blue.

A full toss is a type of delivery in the sport of cricket. It describes any delivery that reaches the batsman without bouncing on the pitch first.

A full toss which reaches the batsman above the waist is called a beamer. This is not a valid delivery and will lead to a no-ball penalty, but, like the bouncer, is sometimes used as an intimidation tactic.

Other types of full toss are rarely deliberate, as they can be very easy to hit. A low full toss is frequently the result of an error made while attempting to bowl a yorker, which bounces at the batsman's feet. Occasionally a full toss can surprise a batsman so effectively that he is unable to play it properly, and this can lead to a wicket, but few bowlers rely on this.

There have been occasions in which a bowler intentionally bowls a full toss to achieve maximum swing into the base of the stumps.
