= Beamer (cricket) =

Type of illegal delivery in cricket

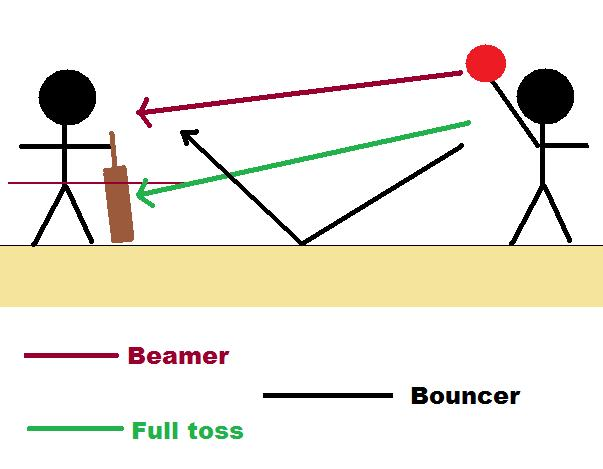
Beamer bounce and full toss distinctions

In cricket, a beamer (less commonly beam ball) is a type of delivery in which the ball, without bouncing, passes above the batsman's waist height. This kind of delivery is dangerous, as a batsman will be expecting the ball to bounce on the pitch. The failure to bounce makes it much harder to avoid the ball or to hit it with the bat. It is usually an accident caused by the ball slipping from the bowler's hands at delivery, but they have been bowled deliberately, an act highly contrary to the Laws of Cricket and the sportsmanship expected of the players.

This type of delivery can result in injuries to the batsman, and the penalty is an immediate no-ball and, in Twenty20 and one-day matches, a free hit. The use of beamers is governed under Law 41.7. The bowler is then given a warning by the umpire for dangerous bowling. Repeated or deliberate cases may result in the bowler being barred from bowling again for the remainder of the innings (or match), as happened with Waqar Younis in the 2003 Cricket World Cup. Fast bowlers, particularly younger players yet to fully refine their techniques, are likely to bowl such deliveries more often than other bowlers, albeit accidentally.

A beamer may not necessarily be bowled with intent. It may be due to sweaty hands or a wet ball, causing a slipped release from the hand. It is also possible that the bowler attempts to bowl a yorker which goes askew.

A bowler can legally target the batsman with a ball aimed at his head that bounces, called a bouncer. These are easier to play or avoid than beamers, as beamers do not land on the pitch and are illegal, batsmen are caught by surprise and the technique of batting, using feet and body movement to meet the ball after it pitches does not apply.

Abdur Rehman, a Pakistani spin bowler, bowled three consecutive beamers in the 2014 Asia Cup against Bangladesh, and was banned from the match without actually bowling a single legitimate ball, despite giving away 8 runs. This was the first time this happened in the history of cricket.

Shoaib Akhtar, Pakistani fast bowler, admitted that he bowled a beamer against Mahendra Singh Dhoni on purpose.

== See also ==
- Full toss
- Beanball – the baseball equivalent of a beamer
- Bodyline
