= Leg bye =

Cricket term

In cricket, a "leg bye" is a type of extra, a run scored by the batting team without the batsman hitting the ball. Law 23 of the Laws of Cricket specifies that one be scored when the ball is not hit with the bat, but it hits the batsman's body or protective gear.

== Scoring leg byes ==
If the ball deflects off the batter's body, the batsmen can attempt to score runs in a similar manner as if the ball had been hit. The number of runs scored are scored as leg byes – they are added to the team's total, but not to the number of runs scored by the batter nor to the runs conceded by the bowler. If the ball deflects off the batter's body and travels all the way to the boundary, the batting team immediately scores four leg byes, similarly to the ball having been hit to the boundary for a four.

The only part of the batter's body to which the rule does not apply is the hand or hands (that is, the batter's gloves) holding the bat, which are deemed for the sake of the rules to be a part of the bat. If the ball strikes a hand which for whatever reason is not holding the bat, then leg byes may be scored. However, if the batter deliberately allows the ball to hit a hand which is not holding the bat no leg byes can be scored, and he may on appeal be given out obstructing the field.

Leg byes may only be scored if the ball hits the batter who was:

- attempting to hit the ball with his bat, or
- attempting to evade being hit by the ball.

If the batter was attempting neither of these, and the ball hits his body, it is a dead ball and runs may not be scored. If the batsmen attempt to score runs in this instance, the fielding team may attempt to run either of them out. If the batting pair complete such a "run" when the ball is dead, the umpire signals dead ball, the run is not scored, and the batters must return to their wickets as before the run attempt.

If it appears that the ball would have hit the stumps were it not for the batter's legs, the batter may be dismissed leg before wicket.

Leg byes are the most common form of extras scored in Test cricket. The average number of leg byes scored in a Test match is about 20; in a 50 over game it is about 10. The most leg byes in a single test innings is 35, conceded by England against South Africa in the Proteas' tour of England, on 1 August 2008.

== Scoring notation ==
The conventional notation for a single leg bye is a triangle with a point at the base and horizontal edge at the top (an inverted bye symbol). If more than one leg bye is taken the number scored is written within the triangle - in practice it is easier to write the number down and then draw the triangle around it.

== Validity ==
Prior to his retirement from Test cricket Australian captain Steve Waugh called for leg byes to be removed from the sport, commenting: "I don't think you should get runs when you miss the ball."

== Umpire's signal ==
Umpires signal a leg bye with a hand touching their raised knee.
