= Charles Parnther =

English cricketer and civil servant

Charles Henry Parnther (1 October 1813 – 10 November 1854) was an English civil servant and cricketer who played first-class cricket for Cambridge University, Marylebone Cricket Club, the Gentlemen and England teams between 1832 and 1836. He was born at Westminster, London and died at Walham Green, also in London.

Parnther was educated at Eton College and Trinity College, Cambridge. As a cricketer, he was an all-rounder: generally a middle-order batsman and a bowler, though it is not known what his batting or bowling styles were. His best bowling match was for Cambridge University against the Cambridge Town Club in 1834 when he opened the batting and top-scored for the university with 31 in the second innings, and took at least seven of the 10 Town wickets, and caught one of the others: the full figures for the game are not available. His best batting came in another good all-round game for him: playing for MCC against Cambridge University in 1835, he scored 17 and an unbeaten 43, and also took seven university wickets, with five in the second innings. He played in the Gentlemen v Players matches of 1834, 1835 and 1836 without much success, and in three games for the England team (which played as "England") he made only one run and took no wickets at all.

Parnther graduated from Cambridge University with a Bachelor of Arts degree in 1836; he was later employed at the Foreign Office.
