= Stumped =

Method of dismissal in cricket

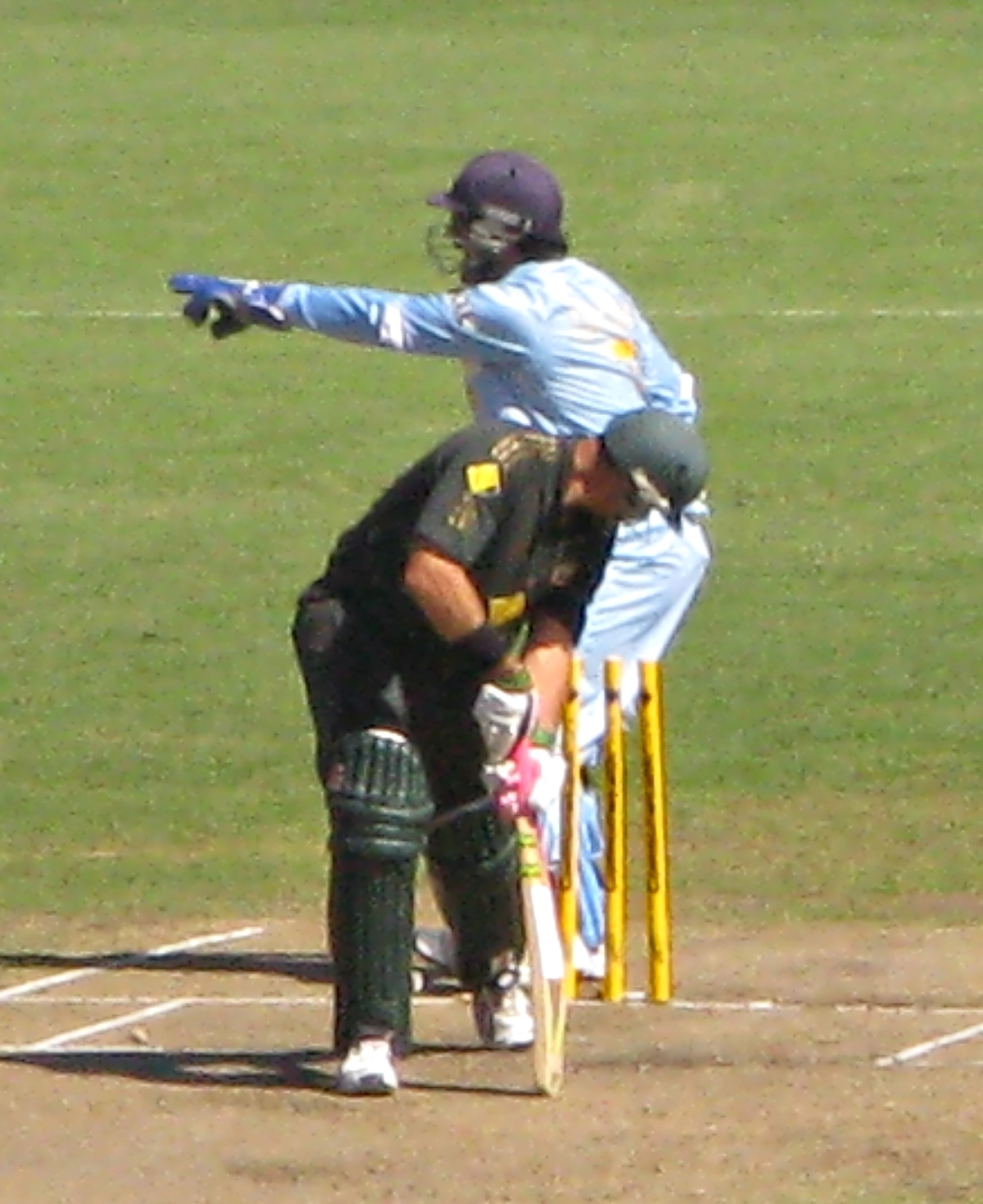
Indian wicketkeeper M. S. Dhoni appeals for a stumping against Australian batsman Matthew Hayden

Stumped is a method of dismissing a batter in cricket, in which the wicket-keeper puts down the wicket of the striker while the striker is out of their ground. It is governed by Law 39 of the Laws of Cricket.

Being "out of their ground" means no part of the batter's body, equipment or bat is touching the ground behind the crease.

Stumped is a special case of run out, but a stumping can only be effected by the wicket-keeper without the intervention of another fielder, when the striker is not attempting a run, and the ball must not be a no-ball. If the criteria for both stumped and run out are met, then the dismissal will be recorded as a stumping and credited to the bowler and wicket-keeper.

As always in cricket, one of the fielding team must appeal for the wicket by asking the umpires. It is the striker's end umpire who adjudicates all stumpings, and all run-out appeals at the striker's end.

== History ==
The earliest known instance of a batsman being stumped was in 1744. J. Bryant (i.e., one of the brothers James or John Bryant) of England was dismissed by George Kipps, the noted Kent wicket-keeper. The match was England v Kent on the Artillery Ground. The surviving match scorecard is the first to include dismissal information.

== Practice ==
Stumping is the fifth-most-common form of dismissal after caught, bowled, leg before wicket, and run out, though it is seen more commonly in shorter forms of the game such as Twenty20 cricket, because attacking batting leads both to batters more frequently losing their balance, and to deliberately leaving the crease to better strike the ball.

Most stumping dismissals are effected by the keeper "standing up" (i.e., able to put down the wicket by reaching out with the gloved hand holding the ball) and so are usually taken by a medium or slow bowler, especially a slower spin bowler. If the keeper is "standing back" to a faster bowler, the wicket-keeper may throw the ball at the stumps to remove the bails ("throw down the wicket") and is also credited with the stumping, although any other fielder throwing down the wicket would be a run out.

Stumping is often an intended consequence of the fielding team's setup and involves cooperation between bowler and wicket-keeper: the bowler draws the batter out of their ground, such as by delivering a ball with a shorter length to tempt the batter to step forward to create a half-volley, and when they miss the ball, the keeper catches it and breaks the wicket before the batter "makes their ground" (i.e., places the bat or part of their body on the ground back behind the popping crease).

If the bails are removed before the act of stumping (e.g., by the keeper's foot), the batter can still be stumped if the wicket-keeper removes one of the stumps from the ground, while holding the ball in the hand or arm that is in contact with the stump.

A batter may be out stumped off a wide delivery, in which case the batting team are still credited with the one run extra and both umpires are required to signal to the scorers: the bowler's end umpire signals the Wide, the striker's end, that the batsman is out.

A batter cannot be stumped off a no-ball (as stumped is credited to the bowler, the fielding team cannot benefit from the illegal delivery).

Notes:

- The popping crease is defined as the back edge of the crease marking (i.e., the edge closer to the wicket. Therefore, a batter whose bat or foot is on the crease marking, but does not touch the ground behind the crease marking, can be stumped. This is quite common if the batter's back foot is raised so that only their toe is on the ground.
- The wicket must be properly put down in accordance with Law 29 of the Laws of cricket: using either the ball itself or a hand or arm that is in contact with the ball at the point of breaking the wicket. A stumping is also valid if the ball merely rebounds from the wicket-keeper and breaks the wicket just as if the wicket had been thrown down.
- The wicket-keeper must allow the ball to pass the stumps before taking it, unless it has touched either the batter or his bat first (Law 21.9). If the wicket-keeper fails to do this, the delivery is a no-ball, and the batter cannot be stumped (nor run out, unless he attempts to run to the other wicket).
- If the striker is injured and has a runner (no longer permitted in international cricket or many professional competitions, but within the unmodified Laws of Cricket), the runner leaves their crease and the wicket is put down for what would otherwise be a stumping, the striker is run out, not stumped.

== Records ==
Most men's international stumpings – career
Format	Stumpings	Player	Matches
Test	52	(Australia) Bert Oldfield	54
ODI	123	(India) Mahendra Singh Dhoni	350
T20I	34	(India) Mahendra Singh Dhoni	98
Last updated: 25 August 2019

Most women's international stumpings – career
Format	Stumpings	Player	Matches
Test	17	(England) Shirley Hodges	11
ODI	51	(India) Anju Jain	65
T20I	63	(Australia) Alyssa Healy	162
Last updated: 6 February 2025.
