= Crease (cricket) =

Area demarcated by white lines painted or chalked on the field of play

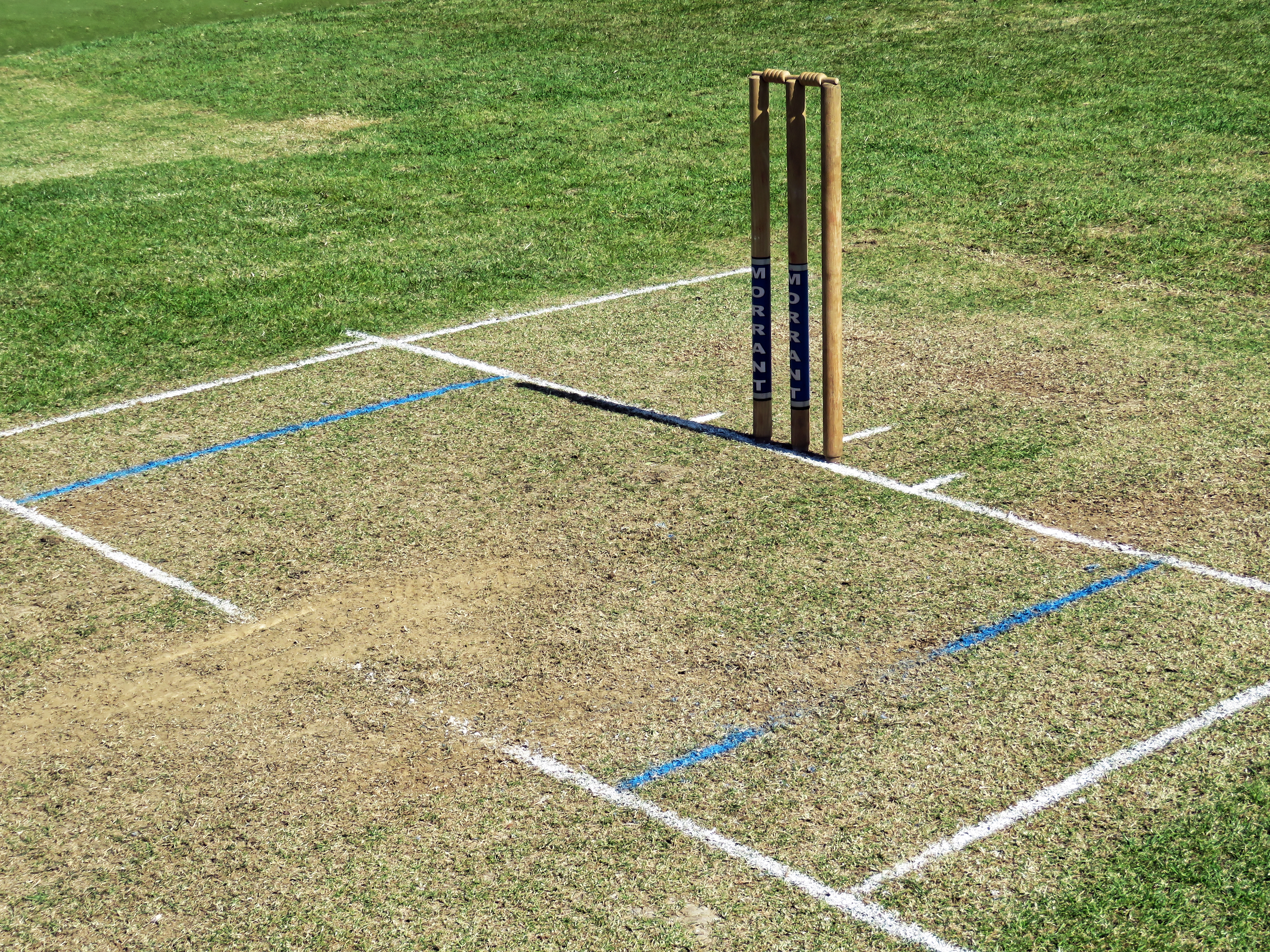
The white crease lines at one end of a cricket pitch.

In cricket, a crease is a white line painted or chalked on the field of play, that defines the area within which the batters and bowlers operate. The term crease may also be used to refer to the rectangular area enclosed by the lines. Law 7 of the Laws of Cricket governs the size and position of the crease markings, and defines the actual line as the back edge of the width of the marked line on the soil, i.e., the edge nearest to the wicket at that end.

Four creases (one popping crease, one bowling crease, and two return creases) are drawn at each end of the pitch, around the two sets of stumps. The bowling creases lie 22 yards (66 feet or 20.12 m) apart, and mark the ends of the pitch. For the fielding side, the crease defines whether there is a no-ball because the wicket-keeper has moved in front of the wicket before he is permitted to do so. In addition, historically part of the bowler's back foot in the delivery stride was required to fall behind the bowling crease to avoid a delivery being a no-ball. This rule was replaced by a requirement that the bowler's front foot in the delivery stride must land with some part of it behind the popping crease (see below).

Cricket pitch and creases

== History ==
The origin of creases is unsure but they were certainly in use by the beginning of the 18th century, being created by scratch marks, the popping crease being 46 inches in front of the wicket at each end of the pitch. In the course of time the scratches became cuts which were an inch deep and an inch wide. Such cuts were in use until the second half of the 19th century. Sometime during the early part of his career, Alfred Shaw suggested that the creases be made by lines of whitewash and this practice was gradually adopted during the 1870s.

== Crease lines ==
=== Popping crease ===
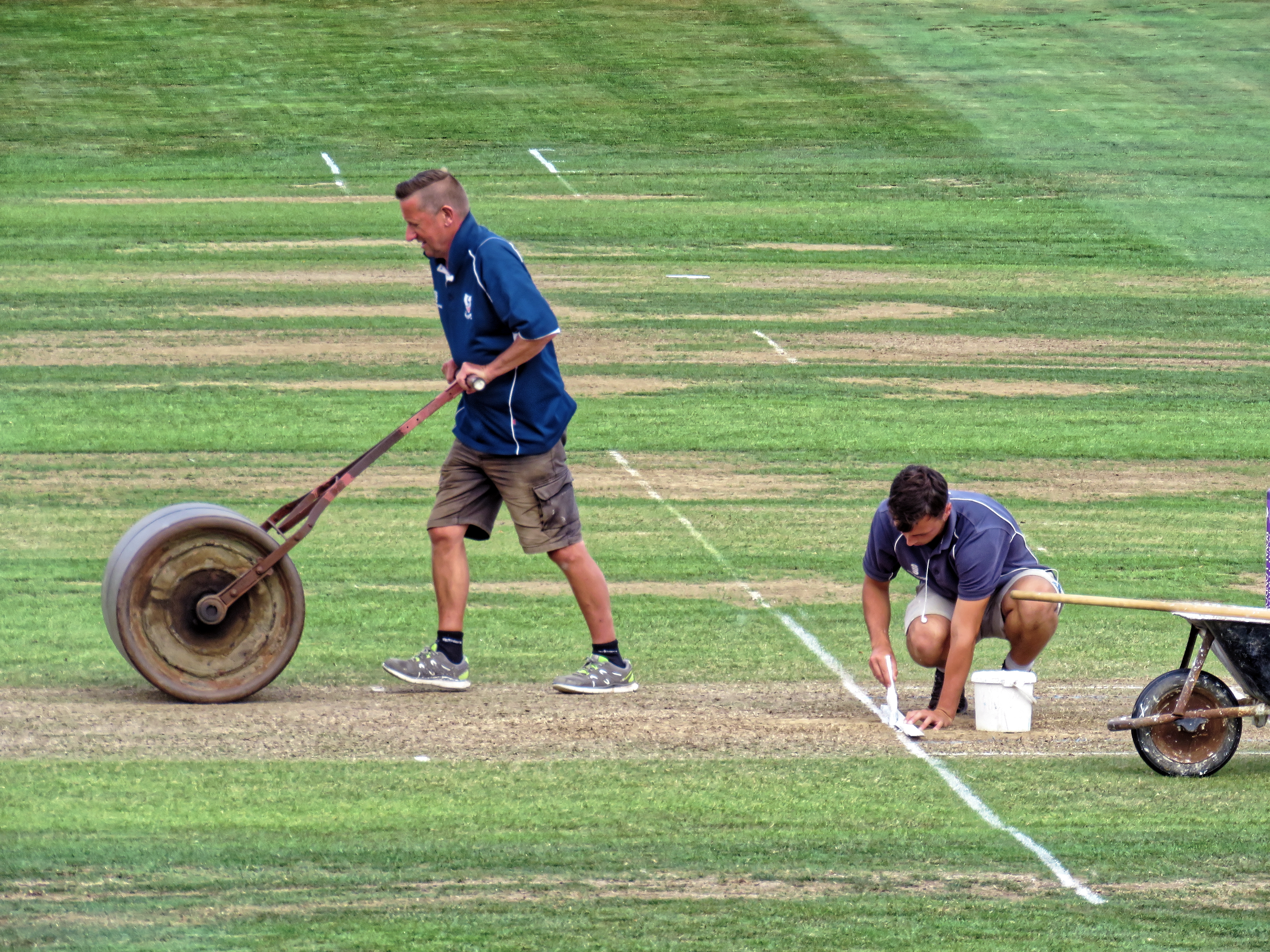
The groundsman on the right paints the popping crease.

The origin of the term "popping crease" is derived from the earlier feature of cricket pitches, the popping hole. One popping crease is drawn at each end of the pitch in front of each set of stumps. The popping crease is 4 feet (1.2 m) in front of and parallel to the bowling crease, and thus 58 feet (18 m) from the other popping crease. Although it is considered to have unlimited length (in other words, running across the entire field) the popping crease need only be marked to at least 6 feet (1.8 metres) at right angles to, and on both sides of, the middle of the pitch. The popping creases are the edges of an area which is an "unsafe zone" for batsmen (they risk being out when they are in this area); the ball must travel through this area when initially bowled to the batsman.

==== For the fielding side ====
For the fielding team the popping crease is used as one test of whether the bowler has bowled a no-ball. To avoid a no-ball, some part of the bowler's front foot in the delivery stride (that is, the first impression of stride when he/she releases the ball) must be behind the popping crease when it lands, although it does not have to be grounded. The foot may be on the line as long as some part of his/her foot is behind the line. This has given rise to the term "the line belongs to the umpire." In addition, a no-ball is called if the bowled ball bounces more than once before it reaches the popping crease of the striker, or if more than two non-wicketkeeping fielders are behind that popping crease on the on side at the time of the delivery. There is no limit to how far a bowler may bowl behind the crease other than that he must be visible to the umpire sufficient for him to verify that the bowling is indeed legal.

==== For the batting side ====
For a batsman the popping crease – which can be referred to as the batting crease in the context of batting – determines whether they have been stumped or run out. This is described in Laws 29, 38, and 39 of the Laws of Cricket. For a run-out, the wicket near the popping crease must be put down when the batsman is not within their ground behind the popping crease. A 2010 amendment to Law 29 clarified the circumstance where the wicket is put down while a batsman has become fully airborne after having first made his ground; the batsman is regarded as not being out of his ground.

- If the batsman facing the bowler (the striker) steps out of his ground to play the ball but misses and the wicket-keeper takes the ball and puts down the wicket, then the striker is out stumped.
- If a fielder puts down either wicket whilst the batsmen are running between the wickets (or otherwise forward of the popping crease during the course of play), then the batsman nearer the ground of the downed wicket is out run out.
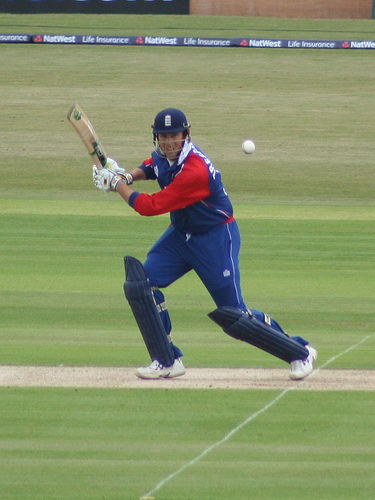
The popping crease is visible here, with England's Marcus Trescothick playing a shot that has involved him moving forward over his own crease to intercept the ball. In taking a successful run, he must ground his bat behind the corresponding crease at the other end of the pitch, and his batting partner must in turn ground himself behind Trescothick's crease. Should Trescothick have ventured beyond his crease in playing his shot, he risked being stumped.

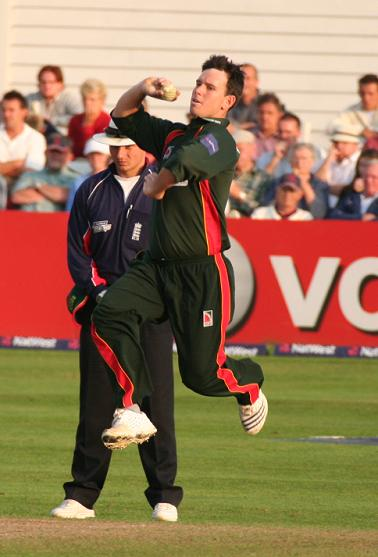
Jim Allenby bowling; he must ground some part of his foot behind his popping crease and within the return creases for the ball to be a legal delivery. As a member of the fielding side, he can also – after delivering the ball – attempt to run out a batsman by breaking the stumps with the ball before the batsman manages to return to the popping crease.

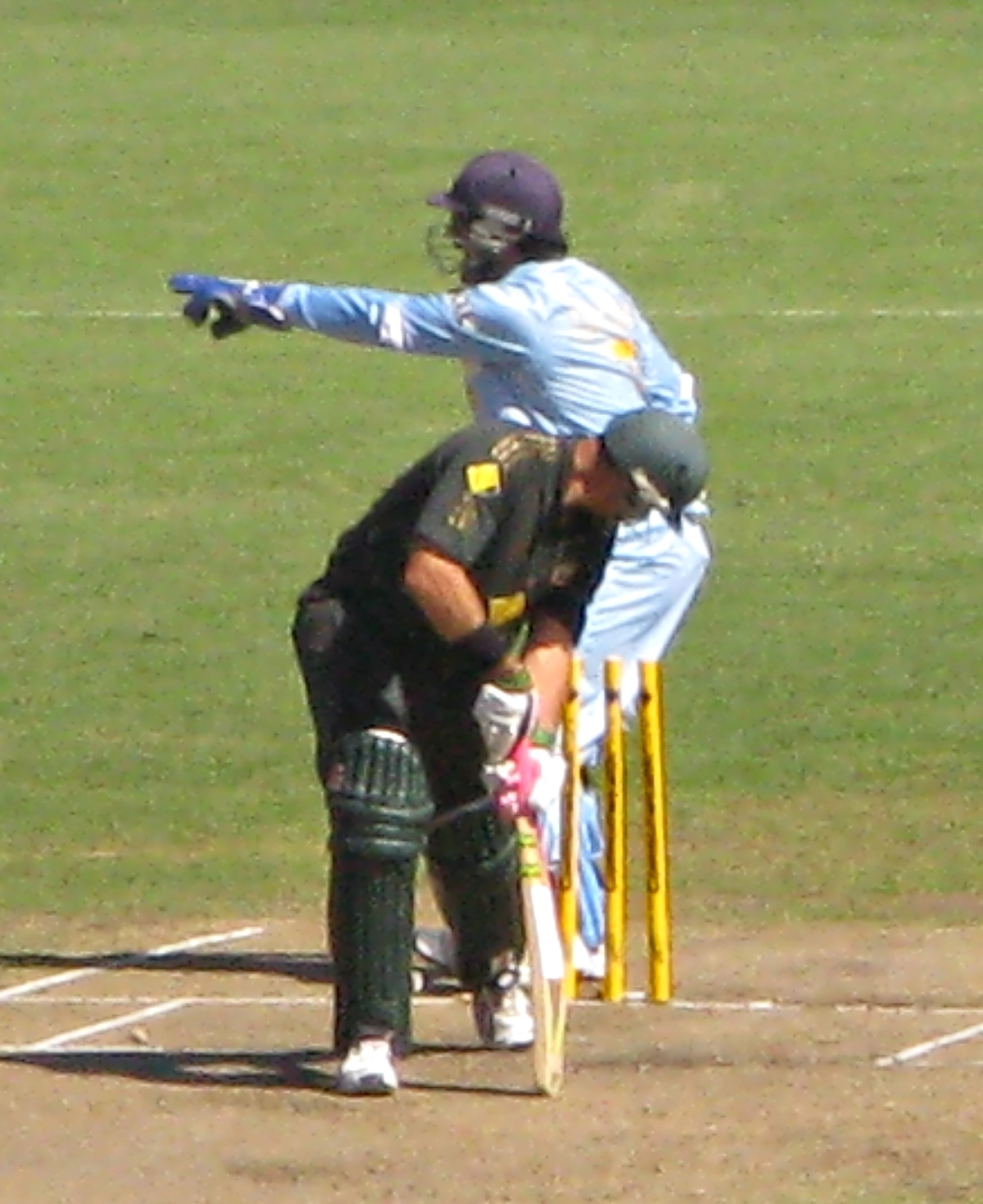
Here the batsman has played a shot and missed, with the wicketkeeper receiving the ball. The 'keeper, believing that in playing his shot the batsman has ventured beyond his popping crease, has broken the stumps with the ball in an attempt to dismiss him 'stumped'. He is appealing to the umpire to review and either accept or refuse the dismissal. It now falls to the umpire to adjudge whether the batsman had indeed ventured beyond his crease, a decision that in modern professional cricket is assisted by technology and replays.

=== Bowling crease ===
Drawn parallel with the popping crease and four feet away from it. The bowling crease is the line through the centres of the three stumps at each end. It is 8 ft 8 in (2.64 m) long, with the stumps in the centre.

=== Return crease ===
Four return creases are drawn, one on each side of each set of stumps. The return creases lie perpendicular to the popping crease and the bowling crease, 4 feet 4 inches (1.32 m) either side of and parallel to the imaginary line joining the centres of the two middle stumps. Each return crease line starts at the popping crease but the other end is considered to be unlimited in length and need only be marked to a minimum of 8 feet (2.4 m) from the popping crease.

The return creases are primarily used to determine whether the bowler has bowled a no-ball. To avoid a no-ball, the bowler's back foot in the delivery stride must land within and not touch the return crease. This is to stop the bowler from bowling at the batsman from an unfair angle (i.e. diagonally).

== Using the crease ==
Though the relatively small size of the crease is such that they limit the degree to which a batsman or a bowler can alter where they stand to face or deliver a ball, there is a degree of latitude afforded whereby both can move around the crease as long as they remain within the aforementioned confines. Batsmen 'use the crease' when they move toward leg or off, before or while playing a shot. Bowlers 'use the crease' by varying the position of their feet, relative to the stumps, at the moment of delivery. In so doing, they can alter the angle of delivery and the trajectory of the ball.

== See also ==
- Batsman's ground
- Cricket terminology
- Laws of Cricket
