= Wide (cricket) =

Type of illegal delivery to a batter

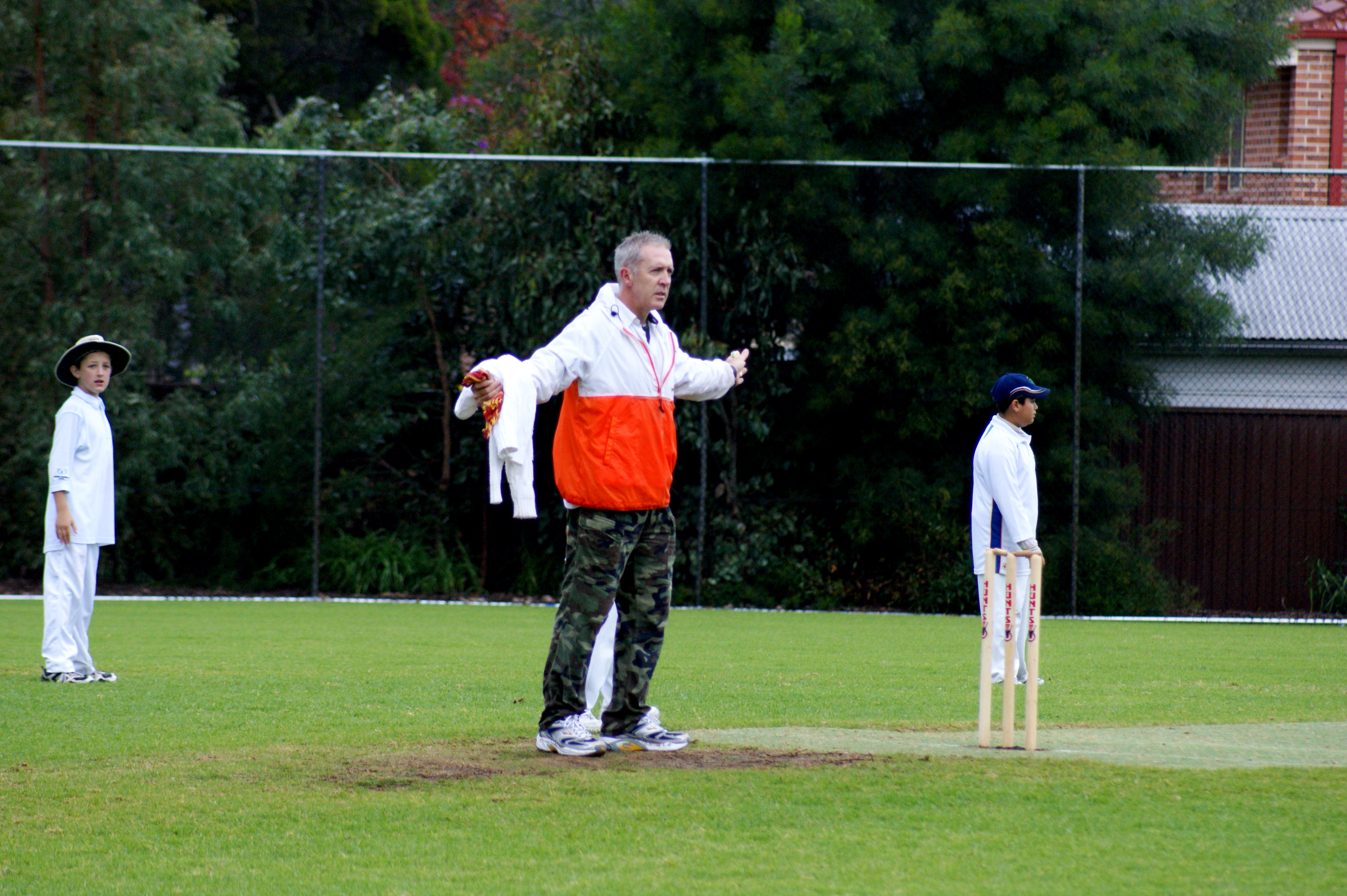
An umpire signals a wide in a junior cricket match.

In cricket, a wide is a type of illegal delivery to a batter (the other type being a no-ball) that is judged by the umpire to be too wide or too high to be hit by the batsman by means of a normal cricket shot. It is also a type of extra, being the run awarded to the batting team as a consequence of such an illegal delivery.

== Definition ==
Wide balls are covered by Law 22 of the Laws of Cricket.

A delivery is a wide if it is not sufficiently within reach for the batter to be able to hit it with the bat by means of a normal cricket stroke from where the batter is standing, and also would not have been sufficiently within reach for the batter to be able to hit it with the bat by means of a normal cricket stroke if the batter were standing in a normal guard position. Therefore a delivery is not a wide if the ball hits the bat or batsman, or if the batsman, by moving, causes the ball to be out of reach.

If a ball qualifies as a no-ball as well as a wide, the umpire will call it a no-ball, and not a wide.

== Effects ==
=== Runs ===
When a wide is bowled, one extra run is added to the team's total, but not added to a batter's total.

If the wicket-keeper fumbles or misses the ball, the batters may attempt additional runs. Any runs scored thus are recorded as wides, not byes. If the wicket-keeper misses the ball and it travels all the way to the boundary, the batting team is awarded five wides. If a wide ball crosses the boundary without touching the ground, only five wides (not seven) are scored - according to Law 19.7, a boundary six can only be scored if the ball has touched the bat.

=== Additional delivery ===
A wide does not count as one of the six deliveries in an over, nor as a ball faced by the batters, and so an additional delivery must be bowled.

=== Bowlers' statistics ===
Wide balls are considered to be the fault of the bowler, and all wide runs conceded are recorded against the bowler in the bowler's bowling analysis. However, this has only been the case since the early 1980s - the first Test to record wides (and no-balls) against the bowler's analyses was India vs Pakistan in September 1983.

== Umpire signal ==
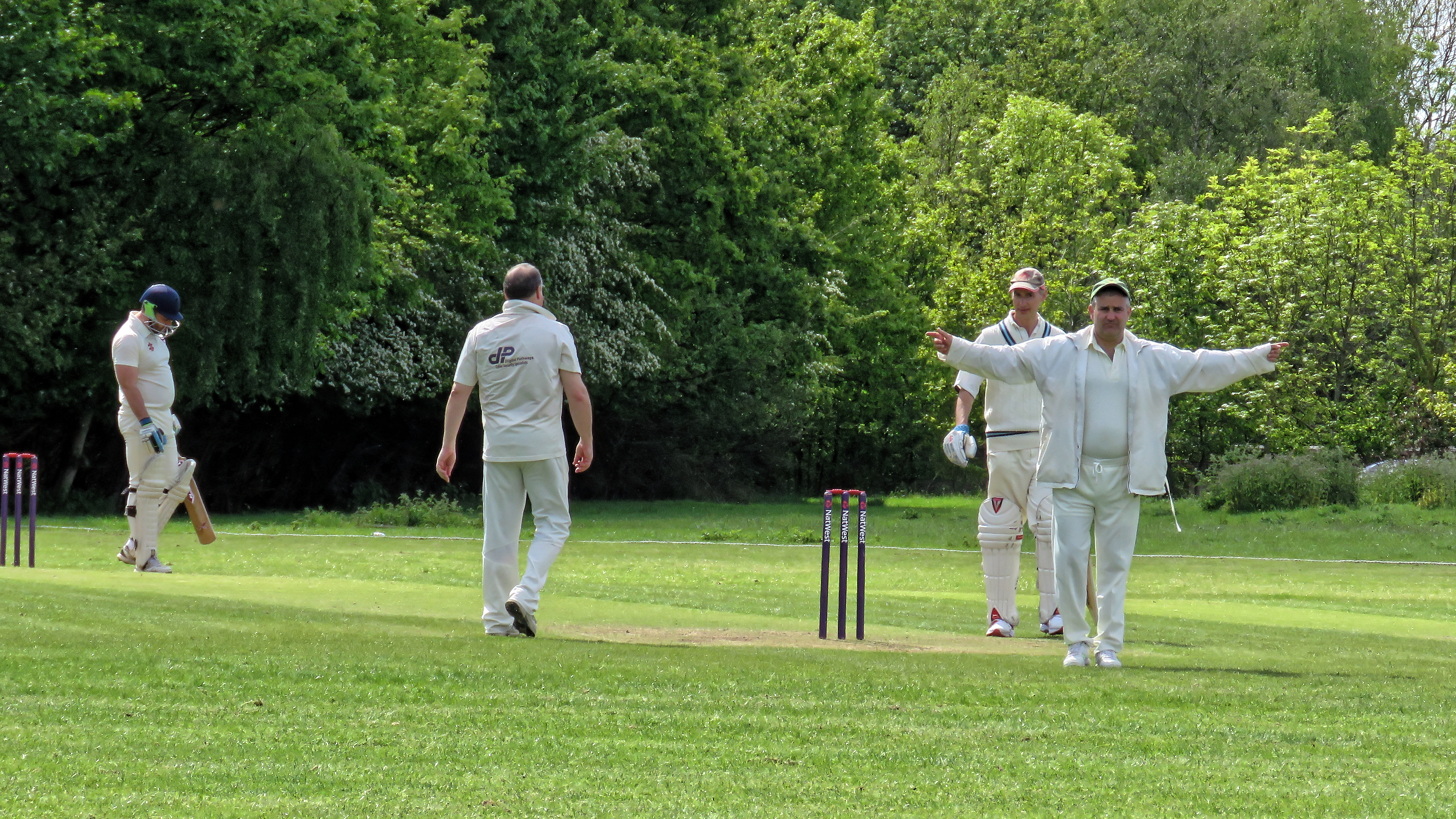
An umpire signals a wide

An umpire straightens both arms to form a horizontal straight line to signal a wide.

== Scoring notation ==
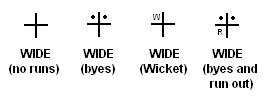
Cricket Scorers' wides notation

The conventional scoring notation for a wide is an equal cross (likened to the umpire standing with arms outstretched signalling a wide).

If the batters run byes on a wide ball or the ball runs to the boundary for 4, a dot is added in each corner for each bye that is run, typically top left, then top right, then bottom left and finally all 4 corners.

If the batter hits the stumps with the bat, or the wicket-keeper stumps the batter, the batter would be out and a ‘W’ is added to the WIDE ‘cross’ symbol.

If a batter is run out while taking byes on a wide delivery then the number of completed runs are shown as dots and an 'R' is added in the corner for the incomplete run.

== Interpretation with batter switching sides ==
If the batsman does a switch hit, then the ball may be bowled to either side of them within the standard distance without being called a wide.

== See also ==
- No ball
- Free hit
- Overthrow
- Ball: the analogous concept in baseball
