= Bye (cricket) =

Rule in cricket sport

In cricket, a bye is a type of extra. It is a run scored by the batting team when the ball has not been hit by the batter and the ball has not hit the batter's body.

== Scoring byes ==
Usually, if the ball passes the batter without being deflected, the wicket-keeper will catch it. This normally prevents the scoring of runs, because the batters will be unable to complete a run before being stumped or run out by the wicket-keeper. However, if the wicket-keeper fumbles or misses the ball, the batters may be able to score runs safely. These runs are scored as byes: they are added to the team's total, but not to the numbers of runs scored by either batter.

If the wicket-keeper misses the ball and it travels all the way to the boundary, the batting team scores four byes, just as if the batter had hit the ball to the boundary for four runs. In the virtually impossible case that a bouncer bounces so high that it flies directly over the boundary without touching the ground, only 4 byes are awarded.

If the ball was a wide, any extras are scored as wides and not as byes.

Whereas wides and no-balls are considered to be the fault of the bowler, and are considered negative statistics in a bowler's record, byes are considered to be the fault of the wicket-keeper, and are considered negatively against the wicket-keeper's record. However, some playing conditions make byes more likely, regardless of a wicket-keeper's ability: wayward fast bowling, or an uneven pitch, or the need for the keeper to stand directly behind the stumps.

Byes are relatively rare in one-day cricket, usually making the smallest component of extras in a score. This is because the batter is more likely to attempt to hit the ball. They are far more prominent in first-class cricket. For example, in the Test series between Australia and England in 2010–11, there were 258 extras in five matches, of which 76 were byes (29.4% of the extras). In the seven one-day and T20 matches that followed between the same sides, there were 262 extras, of which only 10 were byes (3.8% of the extras).

Usually batters do not try to run byes when the wicket-keeper catches the ball. However, in situations at the end of a game when the batting team must score runs quickly in order to have a chance of winning, the batters may risk running a bye and hope that the wicket-keeper fumbles the ball or throws it inaccurately when attempting to run a batter out. The usual result of this is a batter's being run out, but sometimes the tactic pays off: a few One Day International matches, and at least one Test, have been won on byes.

== Scoring notation ==
The conventional notation (used by a scorer on a scoresheet) for a single bye is a triangle with a horizontal edge at the base and a point at the top. If more than one bye is taken the number scored is written within the triangle.

== Records ==
The Test wicket-keeper who has conceded least byes per Test (out of all those who have played 10 tests or more) is Denis Lindsay, with 20 byes conceded in the 15 Tests in which he kept wicket; most of the best keepers in this regard have averaged around 3 or 4 byes per Test. Lindsay conceded no byes at all in his last four Tests.

== Umpire's signal ==
The umpire signals byes by raising his arm into a vertical position, the palm of his hand open to distinguish between the signal for byes and out.

== See also ==
- Passed ball – baseball term for an unhit, uncaught ball
