= Willow and Stumpy =

TV feature

Willow and Stumpy is an animated feature on the Sky Sports TV channel in the United Kingdom. It is accessible using the red button on the remote control when Live Cricket is being shown.

The feature is designed to aid understanding of the rules of cricket, often using diagrams as a visual aid. Willow, the seasoned cricket bat, answers questions put by the younger, more naïve Stumpy, who is one of the stumps.

== Episodes ==
Individual episodes of Willow and Stumpy explain the following aspects of cricket:

- Silly Mid-off
- Night Watchman
- No Ball
- The Googly
- Legside Offside
- The Ball
- The Crease
- Extras
- Round the Wicket and Over the Wicket
- The Yorker
- Swing Bowling
- The Doosra
- Slips
- Fine Leg
- Reverse Swing
