= 1945 English cricket season =

With the end of the Second World War's European theatre in early May 1945, it was possible to organise eleven first-class cricket matches between May and September 1945, the first to be played in England since 1939, though none were part of any official competition.

An Australian Services XI, which included Keith Miller, Lindsay Hassett and Cec Pepper, played five "Victory Tests" against England, plus a further game against Leveson-Gower's XI. England also played a Dominions team at Lord's. A New Zealand Services XI, including Martin Donnelly, played against Leveson-Gower's XI.

Yorkshire hosted Lancashire at Park Avenue, Bradford, in a memorial match for Hedley Verity, who was killed in action two years earlier. The other two matches were Yorkshire against a very useful Royal Air Force XI at North Marine Road; and over-33s against under-33s at Lord's.

== See also ==
- Australian Services cricket team in England in 1945
- New Zealand Services cricket team in England in 1945

== Leading players ==
Leading batsmen in the 1945 season were Len Hutton, who made 782 runs at 48.87 with a highest score (HS) of 188; Keith Miller, 725 @ 72.50 (HS 185); Cyril Washbrook, Bill Edrich, Wally Hammond, Cec Pepper, Martin Donnelly and Lindsay Hassett.

The most successful bowler was Dick Pollard who took 28 wickets at 24.25 with a best bowling analysis (BB) of 6–75. Other leading bowlers were Pepper, who took 27 @ 27.29 (BB 4–57); Reg Ellis, Doug Wright, Bob Cristofani and George Pope.

== Debutants ==
First-class debutants in 1945 included Trevor Bailey and three other future England Test players: Donald Carr, Alec Coxon and John Dewes.

Players who made their final first-class appearances during the season included Herbert Sutcliffe, Learie Constantine and Jack Iddon. Iddon was killed in a motor accident shortly before the beginning of the 1946 season.

== Annual reviews ==
- Wisden Cricketers' Almanack: 1946 edition
