= Keith Johnson (cricket administrator) =

Australian cricket administrator (1894–1972)

Keith Johnson MBE
- Born: Keith Ormond Edley Johnson; 28 December 1894; Paddington, New South Wales, Australia
- Died: 19 October 1972 (aged 77); Sydney, New South Wales, Australia
- Military career
- Allegiance: Australia
- Branch: First Australian Imperial Force; Royal Australian Air Force
- Service years: 1916–1919; 1942–1946
- Rank: Flight Lieutenant
- Unit: Australian Services cricket team
- Conflicts: World War I World War II
- Awards: Member of the Order of the British Empire
- Other work: Member of the Australian Board of Control for International Cricket; Manager of the Australian cricket team for the 1948 tour of England (The Invincibles)

Keith Ormond Edley Johnson MBE (28 December 1894 – 19 October 1972), was an Australian cricket administrator. He was the manager of the Australian Services cricket team in England, India and Australia immediately after World War II, and of the Australian team that toured England in 1948. The 1948 Australian cricket team earned the sobriquet The Invincibles by being the first side to complete a tour of England without losing a single match.

Johnson joined the Australian Board of Control for International Cricket in 1935 as a delegate for New South Wales and served in the Royal Australian Air Force during World War II, performing public relations work in London. With the allied victory in Europe, first-class cricket resumed and Johnson was appointed to manage the Australian Services team, which played England in a series of celebratory matches known as the Victory Tests to usher in the post-war era. The series was highly successful, with unprecedented crowds raising large amounts for war charities. As a result, further matches were scheduled and Johnson's men toured British India and Australia before being demobilised. Johnson's administration was regarded as a major factor in the success of the tour.

In 1948, Johnson managed the Australian tour of England, which again brought record profits and attendances, in spite of Australia's overwhelming dominance. Johnson's management of the tour—which generated large amounts of media attention—was again lauded. However, in 1951–52, the Australian Board of Control excluded Sid Barnes from the team for "reasons other than cricket". Barnes took the matter to court, and in the ensuing trial, his lawyer embarrassed Johnson, who contradicted himself several times under cross-examination. Following the trial, Johnson resigned from the board and took no further part in cricket administration.

== Early years and pre-World War II career ==
Johnson was born on 28 December 1894 in the inner-Sydney suburb of Paddington. He later moved to the north shore suburb of Mosman, where he worked as a mechanic before serving briefly in the 3rd Field Company Army Engineers. On 8 October 1916, in the middle of World War I, Johnson enlisted in the First Australian Imperial Force as a gunner in the 5th Field Artillery Brigade. His unit left Sydney on 10 February 1917 and headed for Europe. He returned to Australia on 1 July 1919.

After the end of World War I, Johnson married his wife Margaret. Johnson joined the Australian Board of Control for International Cricket in 1935 as a delegate for the New South Wales Cricket Association, having been affiliated with the Mosman Cricket Club in Sydney Grade Cricket. He had attended the annual general meeting in September 1934 as a proxy for Billy Bull, who was travelling back to Australia with the national team, which had been touring England.

== Managerial career ==
=== Australian Services ===
During World War II, Johnson served in the Royal Australian Air Force (RAAF). He enlisted in the RAAF on 13 April 1942 in Sydney. Johnson rose to the rank of flight lieutenant and was deployed to London, where he did public relations work at the RAAF's overseas headquarters. In June 1945, he was appointed as manager of the Australian Services cricket team on its tour of Britain for the Victory Tests, India and Australia from mid-1945 to early-1946. Officially a military unit, the team's commanding officer was Squadron leader Stan Sismey of the RAAF, although the on-field captain was Warrant officer Lindsay Hassett of the Second Australian Imperial Force.

Wisden Cricketers' Almanack praised Johnson's organisational work in arranging the services' tour: "A stranger to this country, he found the programme in only skeleton form; and that the tour proved such a success from every point of view was due to his hard work and courtesy." The almanack reprinted Johnson's message of thanks to the English cricket community in full before the team sailed to India.

The Victory Tests started in May 1945 between the Australian Services and England in celebration of the allied victory in Europe. In previous seasons, the English cricket administrator and former captain Pelham Warner had organised matches between the RAAF and various English military teams as an expression of defiance against Nazi air raids, and the Victory Tests were a continuation of this, although the matches were only three days long and did not have Test status.

In the First Victory Test, the Australian Servicemen scraped home by six wickets with only two balls and minutes to spare. The last pre-war series between England and Australia in 1938 had been an attritional and hard-nosed contest, but in the afterglow of the war victory, the cricketers played flamboyantly with abandon in front of packed crowds. The attractive, attacking style of play was widely praised by commentators and the match raised £1,935 for war relief charities. England then levelled the series by winning the Second Victory Test at Bramall Lane, Sheffield with a hard-fought battle, by 41 runs. Australia won the Third Victory Test by four wickets late on the final day and drew the Fourth Victory Test at Lord's. That would have been the end of the series, but because of the record attendance of 93,000 at Lord's, another match was appended. England drew the series by winning the Fifth Victory Test in front of another capacity crowd. The Victory Tests were regarded as an outstanding success, with a total attendance of 367,000 and bright and attacking play.

Due to the unexpectedly strong success of the Victory Tests, the government of Australia, acting on the impetus of Foreign Minister H.V. "Doc" Evatt, ordered the Australian Services to delay their demobilisation. With the team raising so much money for war charities, the government directed them to travel home via India and Ceylon to play further matches, in order to raise more funds for the Red Cross.

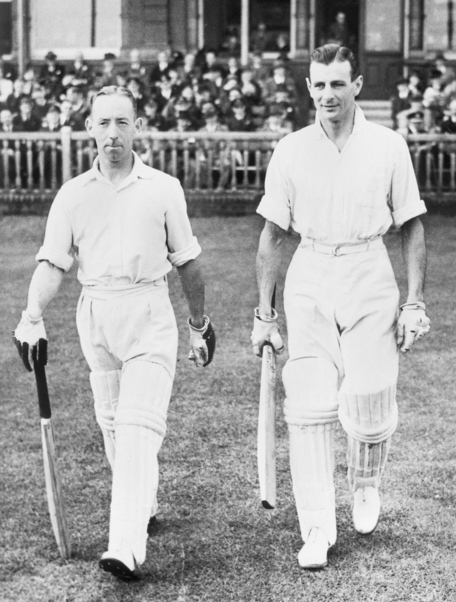
Hassett (left) and Sismey, the captain and commanding officer of the team respectively

Johnson found himself in a difficult situation during the Indian leg of the tour. The team—mostly made up of RAAF personnel—had been ill with food poisoning and dysentery, and travelled across the Indian subcontinent by long train journeys. The airmen wanted to travel by air, and threatened to abandon the tour or replace Hassett, an AIF member, with either Keith Carmody or Keith Miller, who were RAAF fighter pilots. However, the standoff was ended when Sismey arranged for a RAAF plane to transport the team. On the playing arena, it was not a happy tour for Johnson and his men. They lost the three-match series against India 1–0 and recorded only one victory, against South Zone, in their nine matches.

Johnson's team arrived in Australia towards the end of 1945, but the armed services and Australian Board of Control ordered them to play another series against the various Australian states. Johnson had sought fixtures for his team in Australia, but this was before the Evatt had added the matches in the subcontinent. He implored the administrators to recognise that the players were already overworked, but was ignored. The Services performed poorly; after playing out consecutive draws against Western Australia and South Australia, they were crushed by an innings by both Victoria and New South Wales, before drawing against Queensland and Tasmania, the smallest state in the country.

Johnson was involved in another administrative dispute during the Australian leg of the campaign. Cec Pepper—whom teammates Miller and Dick Whitington regarded as one of the best all rounders in the world and a certainty for Australian Test selection—appealed for leg before wicket against Australian captain Don Bradman in the match against South Australia. The appeal was turned down and Pepper complained to the umpire Jack Scott, prompting Bradman—who was also a member of the Australian Board of Control and the board of the South Australian Cricket Association—to ask Scott whether Pepper's behaviour was acceptable. As he was an employee of the SACA, Scott answered to Bradman, and he lodged a complaint about Pepper to the Australian Board of Control. Pepper was never selected for Australia. Cricket historian Gideon Haigh said that "Johnson was clearly upset by the affair, and also by the failure of the [national] selection panel [Bradman among them] ... to send Pepper, second only to Miller as a cricketer in the Services XI, to New Zealand". Johnson tried to intercede on Pepper's behalf, to no avail, although the other board members claimed that no pressure had been placed on the selectors to exclude Pepper.

The home leg of the tour was a poor end to the long and taxing Australian Services campaign. As the military men played poorly in Australia, the national selectors concluded that their achievements against England must have been against weak opposition, and only Hassett and Miller were selected for the Australian tour of New Zealand. Johnson then helped to arrange England's first post-war tour of Australia, in 1946–47.

=== 1948 tour ===
Johnson was a late appointment as manager for the 1948 tour of England, taking over from his New South Wales colleague Bill Jeanes, who was secretary of the Australian Board of Control and had managed the previous Australian tour of England in 1938. Jeanes had become increasingly unpopular among the players because of an approach that Haigh called "increasingly officious and liverish".

Led by Bradman—widely regarded as the greatest batsman in history—the Australians went through their 34 matches without defeat, earning the sobriquet The Invincibles. They won 25 of their matches, 17 of these by an innings, and crushed England 4–0 in the five Tests, winning most games heavily.

Despite the Australians' domination of the local teams, the English public showed unprecedented levels of interest in the cricket. Record gate takings were registered at most venues, even when rain affected the matches, and the record attendance for a Test match in England was broken twice, in the Second Test at Lord's and the Fourth Test at Headingley. The 158,000 spectators that watched the proceedings at Headingley remain a record for a Test on English soil. As a result, Australia made £82,671 from the tour, resulting in a profit of £54,172. The popularity of the team meant that they were inundated with invitations for social appointments with government officials and members of the royal family, and they had to juggle a plethora of off-field engagements, with 103 days of scheduled cricket in the space of 144 days. As a result, Johnson was flooded with phone calls and letters, which he had to attend to by himself, as he was the only administrator among the touring party. Bradman later said he was worried that Johnson's tireless work would cause health problems because he "worked like a slave day and night" and that "it was the tribute to a bulldog determination to see the job through". The journalist Andy Flanagan said that Johnson was "'on the ball' every minute of the waking day, and it would be safe to say half the night too."

Johnson was again praised by Wisden in its report on the 1948 tour. "Indebtedness for the smooth running of the tour and general harmony of the team was due largely to the manager, Mr Keith Johnson, hard-working and always genial," it said. "Paying tribute to the loyalty of the players, Mr Johnson said there had not been a discordant note in the party throughout the tour." Flanagan labelled Johnson as "conscientious, reserved, dignified, extraordinarily industrious and scrupulously trustworthy". He went on to say that "No organization, no body corporate, no individual could ever hope to have a more loyal, a more devoted, or a more conscientious officer...Although to the world in general all the praise and glory for the unequalled triumph the tour proved to be goes to Sir Donald Bradman, only those who travelled with the team will ever have a proper conception of the part played in that triumph by Keith Johnson." Bradman said that Johnson "created friends and goodwill everywhere both for himself and the team, and no side could have wished for a better Manager". On the journey back to Australia, the players presented Johnson with a silver Georgian salver, with their signatures engraved on the memento.

In a "farewell message" to England quoted in Wisden, Johnson said that the "most lasting memory" would be the team's visit to Balmoral Castle. Johnson said "We felt we were going into an Englishman's home and into his family heart". "It was difficult to believe that we were being entertained by Royalty. My personal wish would be for everybody in the Empire to spend an hour or so with the King and Queen. It would do them a tremendous amount of good."

=== Barnes libel case ===
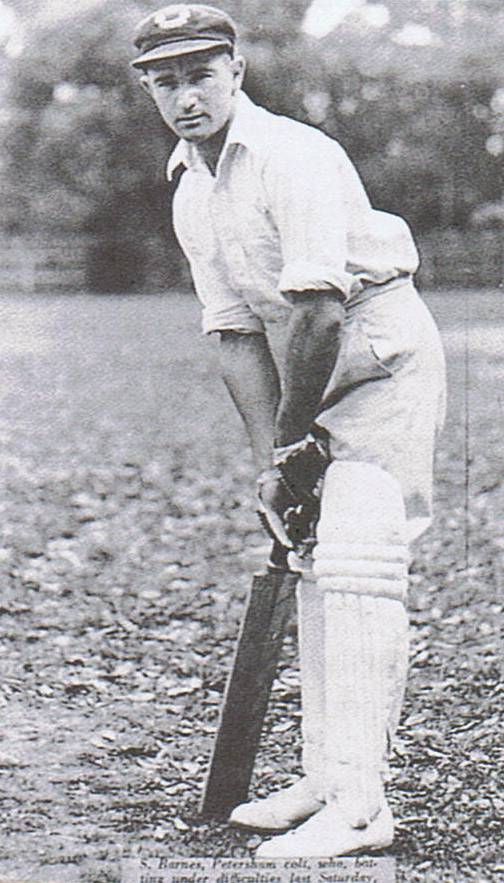
Barnes at the age of 16

Johnson's claim of tour harmony and player loyalty in 1948 was thrown into a different light by events less than four years later. The opening batsman Sid Barnes—a core member of the 1948 team—was seeking a return to Test cricket. Barnes was known for being a somewhat eccentric self-promoter. During the 1948 tour, Barnes organised a multitude of business deals while not playing cricket, and avoided paying customs duties on the enormous amount of goods he acquired in Britain by disembarking at Melbourne instead of Sydney.

Barnes then made himself unavailable for first-class cricket, preferring to pursue business interests instead, and ridiculed the fee paid for the 1949–50 tour of South Africa. He wrote a column for Sydney's The Daily Telegraph, titled "Like It or Lump It", in which he often lampooned the administration of the game.

However, in 1951–52, Barnes made a return to cricket, and sought selection in the national team to play the West Indies during the 1951–52 Australian season. Australia had been unable to find a reliable opener to accompany Barnes's former partner Arthur Morris. Australia's batsmen struggled in the first two Tests, and before the Third Test, Barnes scored 107 against Victoria, putting on 210 in partnership with Morris for New South Wales. The Sporting Globe in Melbourne had presciently predicted that the board would object if the selectors chose Barnes.

Barnes was duly selected for the Third Test by a panel of three, chaired by his former captain Bradman, but the choice was vetoed by the Australian Board of Control "for reasons outside of cricket". Bradman was one of four board members to support Barnes's selection, while 10 objected, including Johnson.

The matches took place and Barnes did not play. He was unable to find out why he had been excluded and was resigned to making an appearance before the board at its next meeting in September 1952 to ask for an explanation.

In the meantime, the team was not announced at the scheduled time due to the delay caused by the veto. Journalists deduced the story and Barnes became a cause célèbre for many weeks, missing all the remaining Tests. Speculation abounded as to the nature of his supposed misdeeds. These included jumping the turnstile at a ground when he forgot his player's pass, insulting the royal family, theft from team-mates, drunkenness, stealing a car, parking his car in someone else's space, or that Barnes had lampooned the board in the narration accompanying the home movies he made of the 1948 tour. In later years, a file of unknown authorship regarding Barnes's behaviour was deposited in the NSWCA library. It accused Barnes of allowing young spectators to enter the playing arena to field the ball instead of doing so himself, and of denigrating umpires by cupping his hands over his eyes and showing dissent by implying that they were blind.

Barnes continued to score heavily, and during one match, he crossed paths with Johnson, who reportedly apologised to him for the exclusion from the team. However, Johnson advised Barnes to "keep quiet and say nothing" and added that "You will come out of it all right, you will be a certainty for the 1953 trip [to England]".

On 24 April 1952, a letter appeared in Sydney's Daily Mirror from Jacob Raith, a baker from Stanmore in Sydney, in response to a letter from Barnes's friend Stacy Atkin, which condemned the board for vetoing Barnes's selection. Raith's letter said that the board must have had good reason to exclude Barnes.

The board is an impartial body of cricket administrators made up of men who have given outstanding service to the game. It must be abundantly clear to all that they would not have excluded Mr Barnes from an Australian XI capriciously and only for some matter of a sufficiently serious nature. In declining to meet his request to publish reasons, the board may well be acting kindly towards him.

The Board of Control had previously granted itself the power to exclude a player from the national team "on grounds other than cricket ability" following the poor behaviour of some members of the 1912 team that toured England. Instead, Barnes sued Raith for libel and engaged a top Sydney lawyer, Jack Shand—described by Haigh as "the foremost trial lawyer of his day"— to represent him, with the aim of uncovering the reasons for his exclusion. Bradman felt that Raith's letter was a premeditated set-up to give Barnes a pretext to instigate a trial. The libel trial, held in August 1952, was a sensation, and Johnson, still a member of the board, was the central figure. According to Haigh, "it was effectively the Board, not Raith, in the dock".

It emerged very quickly during the trial that Raith had no particular knowledge of the workings of the board. A series of administrators came forward to say that Barnes had reportedly misbehaved on the 1948 tour, even though Johnson's official report as manager had made no mention of any disharmony. Aubrey Oxlade, the chairman of the board and one of the four board members who voted to ratify Barnes's selection, said that the batsman's indiscretions were "childish things" and "not serious at all". Later, Frank Cush, another board member who had supported Barnes's inclusion, replied "none at all" when asked if there were any legitimate reasons for excluding Barnes. Selector Chappie Dwyer said "I have a very high opinion of him as a cricketer ... and I have no objection to him as a man".

Johnson was called as a witness, and, under questioning from Shand, a different story came out. Johnson agreed that his written report of the 1948 tour had said that the team had behaved "in a manner befitting worthy representatives of Australia" and that "on and off the field their conduct was exemplary". However, in a verbal report, Johnson said he had drawn the board's attention to various misdemeanours by Barnes that, in his opinion, were sufficiently serious to warrant the player's exclusion from future Australian Test sides. Johnson said that Barnes had shown a "general reluctance for anything savouring of authority". The misdeeds included taking pictures as the Australian team was presented to the royal family on the playing arena during the Test match at Lord's, asking permission to travel alone in England (Barnes' family was living in Scotland at the time), and "abducting" twelfth man Ernie Toshack to play tennis during the match at Northampton on a court "300 yards from the pavilion". Under cross-examination, Johnson said that Barnes's taking pictures of the royal family at Lord's was the most serious of these misdemeanours. He admitted he had not known that Barnes had received permission from the MCC and the royal family's protocol chief to take the photos. Shand also established that Barnes had then shown the films to raise money for various charities. He further showed that Barnes had not agitated when reminded of the policy against players meeting with family members on tour. However, Johnson believed that the cumulative effect of the misdeeds "warranted omission from the team" and he saw no problem in the fact that his verbal advice to the board recommending Barnes' exclusion was at odds with the written report on the 1948 tour. Under pressure from Shand, Johnson admitted that "I don't always write what I think". According to Haigh, "Shand effortlessly twisted him [Johnson] inside out".

- Shand: Will you admit one of two things: either your report to the Board or your statement that that was your state of mind, that you thought his conduct was so serious as to be left out of the team—one or other is a deliberate lie?
- Johnson: No.
- Shand: Think what you are saying. One or other was a deliberate and wicked lie.
- Johnson: No.
- Shand: How could you really have thought that he had behaved in a manner befitting worthy representatives of Australia and on and off the field his conduct was exemplary if you thought his conduct was so serious as to warrant his omission from the team? How do you reconcile those two?
- Johnson: After a lot of thought.
- Shand: I am not asking for a lot of thought.
- Johnson: I have to report on the team as a whole, and that is my opinion.
- Shand: You admit that applies to every one of them.
- Johnson: Yes.
- Shand: And yet one of them was guilty of conduct so serious in your opinion as to warrant his omission ... These reports are circulated.
- Johnson: Yes.

...

- Shand: And it would be a misleading report?
- Johnson: Yes.
- Shand: You still claim to be a responsible person?
- Johnson: Yes.
- Shand: You consider it is reasonable to mislead the various state associations?
- Johnson: In a case like that, yes.
- Shand: Depending on the circumstances you have no misgivings about misleading people?
- Johnson: I would not mislead people.
- Shand: You did, didn't you—the state bodies, about Barnes?
- Johnson: Yes.

Shand had nearly reduced Johnson to tears, having previously caused a senior police officer to cry during the hearing of a royal commission the year before. A colleague of Shand's recalled his "capacity of insinuation in tone which could annoy and bring a witness into antagonism". Shand then asked Johnson about a hypothetical case of Barnes being selected in the future. Johnson evaded the matter of whether he would select the player until Shand asked him to assume that "Barnes is in the best possible form and he is the best cricketer in Australia", to which Johnson replied that he would not.

On the trial's second day, soon after Barnes had taken to the witness stand, Raith's counsel withdrew his client's defence. It had been his task, he said, to prove a plea that the allegation in Raith's letter was true, and that Barnes had not been excluded capriciously. Counsel remarked that "seldom in the history of libel actions has such a plea failed so completely and utterly." The case ended at that point; Barnes was vindicated, and Raith's counsel issued him with a public apology. According to fellow administrator Alan Barnes, Johnson was a "wide-open type of bloke" who was vulnerable to manoeuvring. Colleagues advised Johnson to hire a lawyer before the case started, but he refused, saying that the libel case was merely a sporting matter, not a legal one.

=== Aftermath ===
After the libel trial, Johnson resigned from the board on 9 February 1953, and played no further part in cricket administration in Australia. He also resigned from the NSWCA and withdrew his candidature for the manager's position for the 1953 tour of England. Philip Derriman wrote in his history of the NSWCA that Johnson "may be said to have been a victim of that affair no less than Barnes". Johnson wrote to the Australian Board of Control, ostensibly tendering his resignation on the grounds of difficulties in travelling to meetings, and thanking the other members for their "courtesy, cooperation and help". He was not mentioned in the board minutes again until his death was noted almost two decades later.

Johnson retained the support of many of the players: six Victorian members of the 1948 team, including Lindsay Hassett, Ian Johnson and Neil Harvey, wrote to the Herald newspaper in Melbourne expressing their "confidence, respect and affection" for the tour manager. Derriman described Johnson as a "considerate, patient, inoffensive man for whom nothing was too much trouble. As a cricket official, he was efficient and dedicated." Johnson was appointed a Member of the Order of the British Empire for services to cricket in the 1964 Queen's Birthday Honours, and died in 1972 after collapsing when rising to make a speech at a charity lunch in Sydney.
