= Charlie Price (cricketer) =

Australian cricketer and soldier (1917 – 1997)

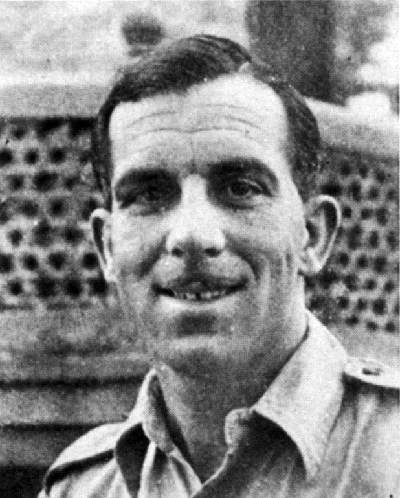

Personal information
- Full name: Charles Frederick Thomas Price
- Born: 17 February 1917; Sydney, New South Wales, Australia
- Died: 19 January 1997 (aged 79); Avalon, Sydney, New South Wales, Australia
- Batting: Left-handed
- Bowling: Slow left-arm orthodox

Career statistics
Competition	First-class
Matches	14
Runs scored	327
Batting average	19.23
100s/50s	0/1
Top score	55
Balls bowled	1,182
Wickets	24
Bowling average	26.79
5 wickets in innings	0
10 wickets in match	0
Best bowling	4/33
Catches/stumpings	11/–
- Source: Cricinfo, 2 February 2022

Charles Frederick Thomas Price (17 February 1917 – 19 February 1997) was an Australian first-class cricketer and Australian Army soldier.

Price was born at Sydney in February 1917. He served in the Australian Army during the Second World War, enlisting as a staff sergeant in the Royal Australian Army Medical Corps in June 1940. Following the end of the war in Europe in 1945, Price appeared in first-class cricket for the Australian Services cricket team. He played in the first two Victory Tests against England in at Lord's in May and Sheffield in June, in addition to playing against H. D. G. Leveson Gower's XI at the annual Scarborough Festival. He took 7 wickets in the Victory Tests, and in the match at Lord's he scored 35 runs batting at number 10, sharing in a stand of 88 with Graham Williams (53) in the Australian Services first innings. In their second innings he was batting alongside Cec Pepper when the winning runs were struck.

Price returned home to Australia with the Australian Services team following their matches in England, stopping off in Ceylon and British India on the homeward journey, where he appeared in six first-class matches in British India and one first-class match in Ceylon against the Ceylon cricket team. Arriving in Australia in December 1945, Price represented the Australian Services in four further first-class matches against Western Australia, Victoria, Queensland, and Tasmania. Playing in 14 first-class matches in all, Price scored 327 runs at an average of 19.23; he made one half century, a score of 55 against West Zone. With his slow left-arm orthodox bowling, he took 24 wickets at a bowling average of 26.79, with best figures of 4 for 33.

Price was discharged from the army in March 1946. Upon his return home, he moved to rural New South Wales, where he went into business. Price died in the Sydney suburb of Avalon in January 1997.
