= Dick Whittington (disambiguation) =

Dick Whittington may refer to:

- Richard Whittington (c. 1354 – 1423), English merchant and politician
- Dick Whittington (photographer), American photographer
- Dick Whittington (DJ), American disc jockey
- Dick Whittington (horse), racehorse
- Dick Whittington Tavern, a pub in Gloucester, England

== See also ==
- Richard Whittington (disambiguation)
- Dick Whittington and His Cat
