= Victory Tests =

The Victory 'Tests'
- Date: 19 May 1945 – 22 August 1945
- Location: England
- Result: five match series drawn 2–2
Teams
- England: Australia
Captains
- Wally Hammond: Lindsay Hassett
Most runs
- 380 Len Hutton 369 Wally Hammond: 514 Keith Miller; 417 Cec Pepper
Most wickets
- 25 Dick Pollard 15 George Pope: 23 Reginald Ellis; 20 Cec Pepper

The Victory Tests were a series of cricket matches played in England from 19 May to 22 August 1945, between a combined Australian Services XI and an English national side. The first match began less than two weeks after the end of World War II in Europe, and the matches were embraced by the public of England as a way to get back to their way of life from before the war.

The matches are known as the "Victory Tests", but they were never given Test match status by the participating Boards of Control, because the Australian Cricket Board feared their side was not strong enough to compete with a near Test-strength England, so the games only had first class status.

In all, the teams played five three-day matches, two of which were won by each side with one drawn. 367,000 people attended the matches at Lord's (three matches), Old Trafford and Bramall Lane (one each), with the final game at Lord's attracting a then-record 93,000 people for a single three-day match.

== Australian Services XI ==
The Australian side was an amalgam of an RAAF XI, which had already been stationed in England during the war, and another group of mostly AIF soldiers from Australia. The players were deliberately stationed with each other in England for the express purpose of forming a cricket team to tour the country, with Australian prime minister John Curtin pushing for the immediate resumption of international cricket after the war was over. The team was officially a military unit, commanded by Squadron Leader Stan Sismey, the team's wicket-keeper. Lindsay Hassett was the on-field captain.

Only one player in the side, future Test captain Lindsay Hassett, had any previous Test match experience, and the rest of the side was made up mostly of Australian Sheffield Shield players. Keith Miller, at the time only considered a promising batsman with Victoria, played what many consider to be his 'breakout' series in the Victory Tests, ensuring that when he returned to Australia he would have a place in the Australian national team now referred to as The Invincibles.

Graham Williams, the team's main strike bowler, had only been released from a German prisoner of war camp weeks before the series started, and played at 31 kg (68 lb) below his pre-war playing weight. In between overs he drank glasses of glucose and water to keep his energy up, but when he was unable to bowl Miller took his place.

The Australian team, despite being split by rank and service, all took their place in the side in good spirit and not much was made of the fact that Hassett, a warrant officer who was outranked by almost every other member of the team, was appointed captain.

== English side ==
The English side's batting line-up was strong enough to be considered Test-strength, with players like Len Hutton, Wally Hammond, Les Ames, Bill Edrich and Cyril Washbrook, all of whom played Test cricket for England. Hutton held the record for the highest individual Test innings at the time with the 364 that he scored against Australia in 1938, and Hammond boasted 7,249 Test runs at an average of 58.45 over his career, despite being over 40 by the time the Victory Tests were played.

But although the English batting side was far superior to the Australians, they only managed to score over 300 runs in one innings for the entire Victory Test tour.

Their bowling was seen as their weakness, and indeed a lot of changes were made to the bowling attack throughout the series. It worked for the last match of the series, when Australia were kept to under 250 runs in both of their innings, but none of the bowlers – bar seam bowler Dick Pollard, who took 25 wickets in his four matches – were very consistent, or indeed selected with any regularity. George Pope took eight wickets in the second match, only to miss the third, and then came back to take six in the fourth match.

== Series summary ==
The series was drawn 2–2, with one match drawn.

=== First match ===
19–22 May 1945
Scorecard

| England | v | Australian Services |
| 267 (100.1 overs); LEG Ames 57; AG Cheetham 3/49 (13.1 overs) | | 455 (125.3 overs); KR Miller 105; JWA Stephenson 5/116 (36 overs) |
| 294 (115.4 overs); JDB Robertson 84; CG Pepper 4/80 (32.4 overs) | | 107/4 (22.4 overs); CG Pepper 54*; AR Gover 1/51 (11.4 overs); JWA Stephenson 1/51 (11 overs) |

Australian Services won by 6 wickets
Lord's, London
Umpires: G Beet and AJB Fowler

- England won the toss and elected to bat.
- 20 May was taken as a rest day
- JA Workman, CFT Price and RS Ellis (all Australian Services) made their first-class debuts.

=== Second match ===
23–26 June 1945
Scorecard

| England | v | Australian Services |
| 286 (110.5 overs); WR Hammond 100; AG Cheetham 3/47 (15 overs) | | 147 (52.5 overs); DK Carmody 42; GH Pope 5/58 (21.5 overs) |
| 190 (73.4 overs); L Hutton 46; CFT Price 3/18 (4.4 overs) | | 288 (102.4 overs); JA Workman 63; R Pollard 5/76 (33 overs) |

England won by 41 runs
Bramall Lane, Sheffield
Umpires: GP Heaton and H Thomas

- Australian Services won the toss and elected to field.
- 24 June was taken as a rest day

=== Third match ===
14–17 July 1945
Scorecard

| England | v | Australian Services |
| 254 (107.1 overs); L Hutton 104; DR Cristofani 4/43 (13 overs) | | 194 (71.1 overs); AL Hassett 68; R Pollard 6/75 (23 overs) |
| 164 (77.3 overs); L Hutton 69; DR Cristofani 5/49 (29.3 overs) | | 225/6 (77 overs); KR Miller 71*; DVP Wright 2/59 (25 overs) |

Australian Services won by 4 wickets
Lord's, London
Umpires: G Beet and AJB Fowler

- England won the toss and elected to bat.
- 15 July was taken as a rest day
- JG Dewes, LR White and DB Carr (all ENG) made their first-class debuts.

=== Fourth match ===
6–8 August 1945
Scorecard

| Australian Services | v | England |
| 388 (130.3 overs); KR Miller 118; GH Pope 4/83 (43 overs) | | 468/7d (147 overs); C Washbrook 112; J Pettiford 3/62 (18 overs) |
| 140/4 (38 overs); J Pettiford 39; GH Pope 2/42 (12 overs) |

Match drawn
Lord's, London
Umpires: G Beet and AJB Fowler

- Australian Services won the toss and elected to bat.
- J Pettiford (Australian Services) made his first-class debut.

=== Fifth match ===
20–22 August 1945
Scorecard

| Australian Services | v | England |
| 173 (59 overs); KR Miller 77*; R Pollard 4/78 (22 overs) | | 243 (86.2 overs); L Hutton 64; DR Cristofani 5/55 (22 overs) |
| 210 (87 overs); DR Cristofani 110*; WE Phillipson 6/58 (29 overs) | | 141/4 (45.1 overs); WJ Edrich 42*; CG Pepper 2/18 (12 overs) |

England won by 6 wickets
Old Trafford, Manchester
Umpires: F Chester and H Elliott

- Australian Services won the toss and elected to bat.

== After the Victory Tests ==
Following on from the success of the tour of England, the Australian Services XI traveled through India and Sri Lanka (then Ceylon) for four months at the request of Australian external affairs minister Dr H.V. Evatt, before returning to Australia to play against Sheffield Shield state sides. The gruelling schedule resulted in many players in the Services side playing well below their capabilities, and by the time they were back in Australia they were routinely beaten easily by the local teams.

However, the importance of the Victory Test tour as a whole cannot be understated, because it helped people get back to their normal lives after the war, and unearthed some of the great cricketers of the time.

== See also ==
- Australian Imperial Forces cricket team
- 1945 English cricket season
