= Ross Stanford =

Australian cricketer

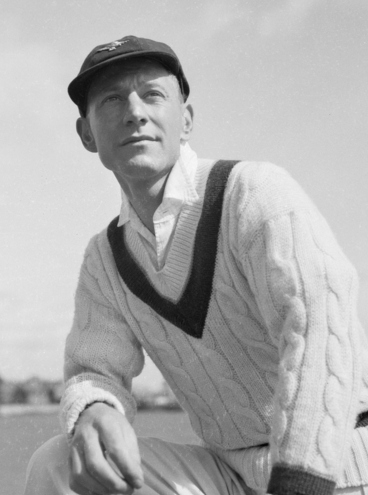
- Stanford in 1945

Personal information
- Full name: Ross Milton Stanford
- Born: 25 September 1917; Fulham, South Australia
- Died: 11 July 2006 (aged 88); Kilburn, South Australia
- Batting: Right-handed
- Bowling: Right-arm medium

Domestic team information
- Years: Team
- 1935/36–1947/48: South Australia
- 1945–1945/46: Australian Services XI

Career statistics
Competition	First-class
Matches	23
Runs scored	832
Batting average	26.00
100s/50s	1/5
Top score	153
Balls bowled	24
Wickets	0
Bowling average	–
5 wickets in innings	–
10 wickets in match	–
Best bowling	–
Catches/stumpings	4/–
- Source: Cricinfo, 27 September 2013

Ross Milton Stanford DFC, OAM (25 September 1917 – 11 July 2006) was a South Australian first class cricketer who served in the Royal Australian Air Force (RAAF) as a pilot during the Second World War, flying Avro Lancaster heavy bombers over Europe. During his military career, Stanford flew 47 operational missions and served in the famed No. 617 Squadron RAF. He also represented the Australian Services XI at cricket, playing games in England, India, Ceylon and Australia before being demobilised in 1946. In civilian life, Stanford ran his own market garden business, worked for the State Bank of South Australia and had an unsuccessful political career. He was also known for his charity work in Adelaide.

== Early life ==
Born in Fulham, South Australia, Stanford's parents own a market garden. Growing up he was a keen cricketer and as a 14-year-old scored 416 not out while playing for Lockleys Primary against Richmond Primary. At the time it was a world record for a schoolboy. His success resulted in a scholarship to Prince Alfred College in Adelaide. He continued his interest in cricket after completing his schooling, joining the West Torrens District Cricket Club. He went on to make his first-class cricket debut as an 18-year-old, playing for South Australia against Tasmania in the Sheffield Shield at the Adelaide Oval in February/March 1936.

His debut proved unsuccessful. Joining Donald Bradman at the crease, Stanford was run out without scoring, with a team-mate later explaining that Stanford had been very nervous. He did not bat again and was dropped from the team for the next match. Having begun a career in the State Bank of South Australia, Stanford's cricketing career was put on hold when he was transferred out of Adelaide to Waikerie and then Tailem Bend. As a result, Stanford would not play first-class cricket again before the outbreak of the Second World War.

== Military career ==
At the age of 23, Stanford enlisted into the Royal Australian Air Force on 21 July 1941, volunteering for active service during the war. After completing pilot training, Stanford was posted to No. 467 Squadron RAAF in August 1943, stationed in the United Kingdom. He remained with the squadron until February 1944, when he was posted to No. 617 Squadron RAF, which also flew Lancasters. During his time with No. 467 Squadron, Stanford flew 23 operations and was awarded a Distinguished Flying Cross. His first operation was flown on the night of 5/6 September 1943 against a target in Mannheim. He flew a further 24 operations with No. 617 Squadron, including a decoy operation around Cap d'Antifer during the invasion of Normandy, and an attack on the railway tunnel at Saumur with 12,000-pound Tallboy bombs in the days following the landing. He reached the rank of flight lieutenant and was later seconded to the Ministry of Aircraft Production to visit aircraft manufacturing plants to speak to workers.

While in England, Stanford returned to first-class cricket, playing a match for an RAAF team against an English side at the County Ground, Hove, in July 1943. Further matches followed throughout 1943–45. In 1945, following the conclusion of hostilities, Stanford was selected to play for the Australian Services XI in the Victory Tests played in England before touring India and Ceylon. After returning to Australia, the side also played several matches against Australian state teams during which Stanford scored his highest first-class score of 153 in a match against Tasmania at the TCA Ground in Hobart in January 1946.

== Later life ==
On 26 March 1946, Stanford was demobilised and returned to civilian life. He returned to the State Bank, but continued to play first-class cricket, playing another nine matches for South Australia in the Sheffield Shield between March 1946 and December 1947. He also played in the local Adelaide competition until 1955, playing for West Torrens. Meanwhile, he stopped working for the bank and ran his family's market garden business. In 1959 and 1968, he unsuccessfully stood for election in the state electoral district of West Torrens. He also contested the federal seat of Hindmarsh in 1966 as a Liberal candidate, but was also unsuccessful.

In the 1960s he began charity work in the local Adelaide community, serving on the gifts committee of the Western Community Hospital in Henley Beach, and as a trustee of the Captain Stuart Memorial Trust. He was awarded a Medal of the Order of Australia in the 1991 Australia Day Honours for his work with the Ryder–Cheshire Foundation. He died on 11 July 2006, at the age of 88, at Kilburn, South Australia. He was married to Joyce, with whom he had two children, Greg and Cynthia; he was survived by his son.
