= Stan Sismey =

Australian cricketer (1916–2009)

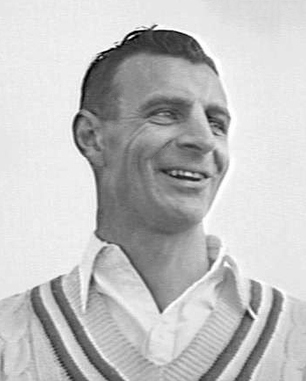
- Sismey in 1945

Personal information
- Full name: Stanley George Sismey
- Born: 15 July 1916; Junee, New South Wales
- Died: 19 June 2009 (aged 92); Taree, New South Wales
- Batting: Right-handed
- Role: Wicketkeeper

Domestic team information
- Years: Team
- 1938/39–1950/51: New South Wales
- 1945–1945/46: Australian Services XI
- 1952: Scotland

Career statistics
Competition	First-class
Matches	35
Runs scored	725
Batting average	17.68
100s/50s	0/4
Top score	78
Catches/stumpings	88/18
- Source: CricInfo, 21 February 2013

Stanley George Sismey OAM (15 July 1916 – 19 June 2009) was an Australian cricketer. Sismey, who achieved the rank of squadron leader in the Royal Australian Air Force (RAAF) during World War II, was the official commanding officer of the Australian Services XI that played England in the Victory Test series that followed VE Day in 1945. He was not, however, the on-field captain, an honour bestowed upon pre-war Test cricketer Lindsay Hassett. Sismey was the team's wicketkeeper and a middle order batsman during the five unofficial Test matches.

In 1942, Sismey was seriously wounded when the flying boat of which he was the co-pilot was attacked by fighter aircraft of the Vichy French Air Force, over the Mediterranean Sea off Algeria. He received multiple wounds in his back from shrapnel. These injuries sometimes affected Sismey long after his recovery: he had to leave a ground during at least one game, because a piece of metal had begun to work its way out of his body. During the Services XI's tour of India in 1945, Sismey withdrew from the team temporarily so that surgeons could remove shrapnel.

Although his cricket career was disrupted by the war, Sismey played 35 first-class matches between 1938 and 1952, mostly for New South Wales. He took 88 catches, made 18 stumpings and was a right-handed batsman with a first-class batting average of 17.68 runs per innings.

According to an obituary in the Sydney Morning Herald, Sismey was unusual amongst wicketkeepers in that he did not break any of his fingers during his 25-year career.

== Personal life ==
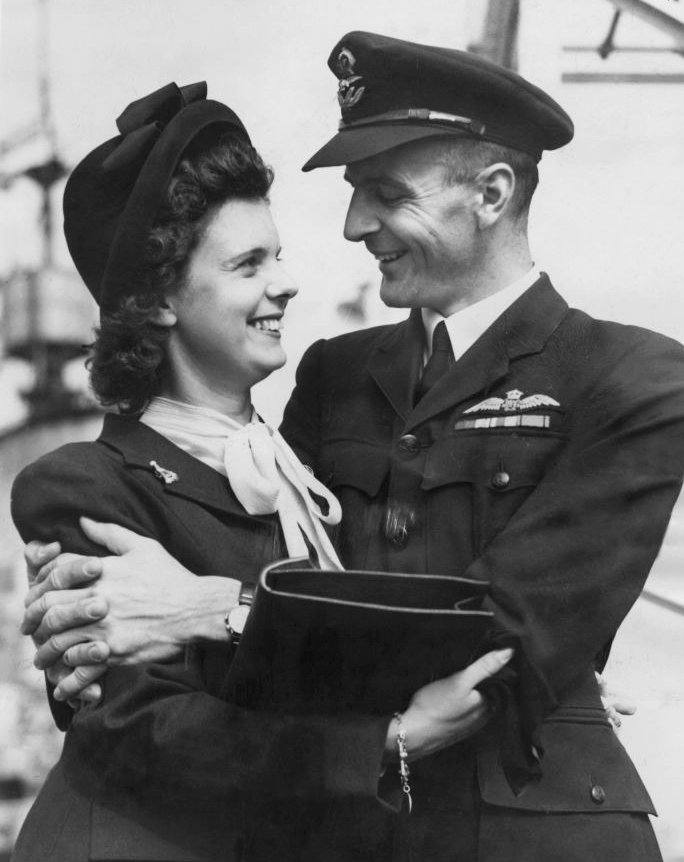
Stan Sismey with wife Elma upon her arrival in Sydney on 3 June 1946

Sismey was born on 15 July 1916 in Junee, New South Wales. He attended Goulburn High School in Goulburn.

In June 1945, while stationed in Scotland, Sismey met and married Sergeant Elma McLachlan (WAAF) of Helensburgh, Dunbartonshire. Their best man was Flight Lieutenant Keith Carmody, a teammate for NSW and the Services XI. Sismey had succeeded Carmody as captain of an RAAF XI – made up of personnel based in the UK – that played the RAF XI. Elma and Stan Sismey had two daughters.

Sismey was a banker by profession, and worked in Australia and Scotland. By the time he retired, Sismey had become a senior manager with the Bank of New South Wales.

Sismey died at Taree on 19 June 2009 at the age of 92. The eulogy at his funeral, at the Forster-Tuncurry Uniting Church, in Forster, was read by Australian all-rounder Alan Davidson.

== Cricket career ==
Sismey entered club cricket as the wicketkeeper for Western Suburbs in the Sydney grade competition. He made his debut for NSW on 15 December 1939 against South Australia – led at the time by Don Bradman – at Adelaide Oval. He was considered a contender to succeed Bert Oldfield as the wicketkeeper of the national team when the war intervened; there were no official international matches involving Australia between 1940 and 1946.

During the war, Sismey played for a combined Dominions XI and a RAAF XI.

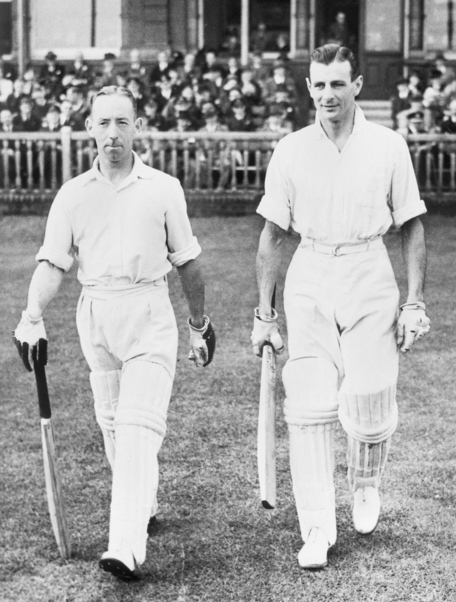
Lindsay Hassett and Stan Sismey (right) walk out to bat for the Australian Services XI, against England, during 1945.

His best first-class batting performance, 78 runs, was achieved for the Australian Services XI against H. D. G. Leveson-Gower's XI at the North Marine Road Ground, Scarborough, Yorkshire in September 1945. Sismey played in the five Victory Tests of 1945, as well as two more unofficial tests in India, and other games in Ceylon (Sri Lanka) and Australia.

On 21 November 1945, as a result of his war wounds, Sismey underwent an operation at a hospital in Bombay (later Mumbai) to remove a metal fragment that was working its way out of his body.

Wisden, commenting on Sismey's performance for the Services XI, said: "Looking to a renewal of the fight for the Ashes, critics tipped Hassett and [Keith] Miller, plus Sismey and Cristofani, to play for Australia. The first two did, to well-remembered effect. Sismey found his way barred, first by the brilliant Don Tallon and then by the stylish Ron Saggers."

Sismey was also kept out of the NSW team by Saggers, before being re-selected during the 1949/50 season, when his keeping also earned him selection for an unofficial Australian Second XI that toured New Zealand. His first-class career in Australia concluded with the 1951/52 season, after which his banking career took him to Scotland. There Sismey played for Clydesdale Cricket Club, as well as one game for the national team of Scotland, during 1952 against Yorkshire at Hamilton Crescent, Glasgow.

He was on the board of selectors for NSW between 1958/59 and 1978/79, including 10 seasons as chairman of the board.

Sismey was honoured with the Medal of the Order of Australia (1990) for "services to cricket", the Australian Sports Medal (2000) for his 20 years of voluntary service as a NSW selector, and life membership in Cricket NSW (the former NSWCA).

== War service ==
Sismey joined the RAAF on 3 February 1941 and was assigned the service number 403605. He received basic training as a pilot in Australia. Under the provisions of the British Commonwealth Air Training Plan (also known as the Empire Air Training Scheme), many Commonwealth aircrews during World War II received advanced training in Canada at Royal Canadian Air Force facilities and, after graduating, were posted to units of their own or other Commonwealth air force units, in various parts of the world. Sismey embarked at Sydney on 13 June 1941 and arrived in Canada on 3 July; he received advanced training at No. 7 Service Flying Training School, RCAF Station Fort Macleod, near Fort Macleod, Alberta.

The incident in which Sismey was wounded occurred on 18 May 1942, when he was the co-pilot of a Consolidated Catalina flying boat flying over the Mediterranean, off Oran, French Algeria. The Catalina (AJ158; callsign "F") was assigned to No. 202 Squadron, Royal Air Force (RAF), based at Gibraltar. It was attacked by three Dewoitine D.520 fighters belonging to Groupe de Chasse III/6 (GC III/6) of the Vichy French Air Force. Sismey received multiple wounds in his back from shrapnel – metal fragments of his own aircraft and/or French ammunition. The crew managed to make a forced landing on the sea, after which the Catalina sank. Further attacks by French aircraft were fended off by Fairey Fulmar fighters from the aircraft carrier HMS Argus, and the crew of a Short Sunderland, commanded by Flight Lieutenant Graham Pockley, from No. 10 Squadron RAAF. The Catalina crew spent eight hours in the sea, and Sismey was unconscious by the time they were picked up by the British destroyer HMS Ithuriel. Nevertheless, all of them survived the incident.

Even after Sismey had recovered from his wounds, many metal fragments remained in his body. He joked that "there was so much shrapnel in his back, that the compasses of the aircraft he flew were affected". On at least one occasion after he resumed playing cricket, Sismey had to leave the ground during a game because a metal fragment had suddenly worked its way out of his body.

Sismey did not return to operational flying duties for more than two years, when he was offered a posting to an RAF unit as a test pilot. Following the end of hostilities he was transferred to RAAF Overseas Headquarters to organise the Services XI. He was discharged from the RAAF on 24 July 1946.

His younger brother, Frank (Francis Leonard Sismey; born 1918), was killed on 20 May 1945, while piloting a RAAF Liberator heavy bomber that crashed while taking off, at Truscott Airfield, in the extreme north of Western Australia.
