= Richard Whitington =

Australian cricketer and journalist (1912–1984)

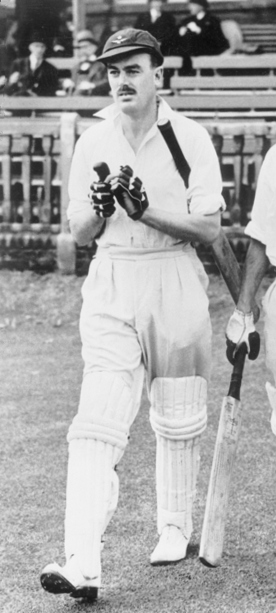
- Whitington in 1945

Personal information
- Full name: Richard Smallpeice Whitington
- Born: 30 June 1912; Unley Park, South Australia
- Died: 13 March 1984 (aged 71); Sydney, New South Wales
- Height: 185 cm (6 ft 1 in)
- Batting: Right-handed
- Role: Batsman

Domestic team information
- Years: Team
- 1932/33–1939/40: South Australia
- FC debut: 4 November 1932 South Australia v MCC
- Last FC: 21 January 1946 Australian Services XI v Queensland

Career statistics
Competition	First-class
Matches	54
Runs scored	2,782
Batting average	32.34
100s/50s	4/14
Top score	155
Balls bowled	128
Wickets	1
Bowling average	91.00
5 wickets in innings	0
10 wickets in match	0
Best bowling	1/4
Catches/stumpings	32/–
- Source: CricketArchive, 3 June 2009

Richard Smallpeice Whitington (30 June 1912 – 13 March 1984) was an Australian first-class cricketer who played for South Australia and, after serving in World War II, represented the Australian Services cricket team in the Victory Tests. He became a journalist, writing as R. S. Whitington.

== Early life ==
Whitington was born in the Adelaide suburb of Unley Park, the younger son of businessman Guy Whitington (23 August 1880 – 5 February 1954) and a member of the distinguished Whitington family of South Australia. He attended Scotch College, Adelaide, before studying law at the University of Adelaide and becoming a lawyer.

He married Alison Margaret "Peggy" Dale on 19 December 1939; they divorced in 1942. He served in the Middle East as a captain with the 2/27th Battalion of the Second AIF. He married Jenny Drake-Brockman in Perth in June 1944.

== Cricket career ==
Whitington began his state cricketing career for South Australia at the age of 20 in November 1932 under the captaincy of Vic Richardson as an opening batsman. He was a regular member of the South Australian side until World War II, playing 36 matches and scoring 1728 runs at an average of 30.85, with three centuries. His highest score for South Australia was 125, which he scored twice against Queensland: in 1936–37, batting at number three, he was the highest scorer in a match that South Australia won by 112 runs; in 1938–39, opening, he put on 197 for the first wicket with Ken Ridings in a ten-wicket victory.

He resumed his first-class career after his war service, taking part in the Australian Services tour of England in 1945, the tour of Ceylon and India, and the short tour of Australia. He played 18 matches on the three tours, scoring 1054 runs at an average of 35.13. He scored one century, 155, in the second of the three matches against an Indian XI: opening, he put on 218 in 175 minutes for the second wicket with Jack Pettiford. In his final first-class match, the last match of the tour, he made 84, the Services XI's top score, in the draw against Queensland.

== Journalism ==
Whitington was a prominent journalist and writer, usually writing as "R. S. Whitington", and he balanced this work with his playing career until his retirement. He was known for his collaborations with Services XI teammate Keith Miller; the pair wrote many books together. Whitington wrote for the Sydney Sun. He was sports editor and roving Test reporter for Consolidated Press, owned and managed by the Packer family. For five years, from the late 1950s to the early 1960s, he worked in South Africa. He wrote numerous books on cricket, many of them prefaced by Sir Robert Menzies, and in later years, the official biography of Sir Frank Packer, and a history of Australian cricket.

== Books ==
=== With Keith Miller ===
- Cricket Caravan (1950)
- Catch: An Account of Two Cricket Tours (1951)
- Straight Hit (1952)
- Bumper (1953)
- Gods or Flannelled Fools? (1954)
- Cricket Typhoon (1955)
- A Keith Miller Companion: A Selection from Cricket Caravan, Catch, Straight Hit & Bumper (1955)

=== With other collaborators ===
- Perchance to Bowl (1961) (with John Waite)
- The Vic Richardson Story: The Autobiography of a Versatile Sportsman (1967)
- Bodyline Umpire (1974) (with George Hele)

=== On his own ===
- John Reid's Kiwis: New Zealand Cricketers in South Africa, 1961–62 (1962)
- Bradman, Benaud and Goddard's Cinderellas (1964)
- Simpson's Safari: South African Test Series 1966–7 (1967)
- Fours Galore: The West Indians and Their Tour of Australia 1968–69 (1969)
- The Quiet Australian: The Lindsay Hassett Story (1969)
- Time of the Tiger: The Bill O'Reilly Story (1970)
- Sir Frank: The Frank Packer Story (1971)
- An Illustrated History of Australian Cricket (1972)
- Captains Outrageous? Cricket in the Seventies (1972)
- The Courage Book of Australian Test Cricket, 1877–1974 (1974)
- Great Moments in Australian Sport (1974)
- An Illustrated History of Australian Tennis (1974)
- The Champions (1976)
- The Datsun Book of Australian Test Cricket, 1877–1981 (1981)
- Keith Miller, the Golden Nugget (1981)
- Australians Abroad: Australia's Overseas Test Tours (1983)
