= Australian Services cricket team in Ceylon and India in 1945–46 =

International cricket tour

The Australian Services cricket team which had played in England in 1945 went home via India and Ceylon, playing further first-class matches in both countries.

The Services team was captained by Lindsay Hassett and included other notable players in Keith Miller and Cec Pepper.

The team arrived in India in October and played eight matches in India. They played a Prince's XI, four zone teams and three matches against an Indian XI. These three games were played, respectively, at Brabourne Stadium in Bombay, Eden Gardens in Calcutta, and M. A. Chidambaram Stadium in Madras. The first two were drawn, and the Indian XI won the third by six wickets.

The Services team moved on to Ceylon in December and played one first-class match versus Ceylon at the Paikiasothy Saravanamuttu Stadium in Colombo. Australian Services won by an innings and 44 runs, largely thanks to a century by Miller.

Arriving back in Australia shortly before Christmas, the team continued its tour by playing against each of the Australian state teams, ending with a game against Tasmania in Hobart at the end of January 1946.

== See also ==
- Australian Services cricket team in England in 1945
