= Cristofani =

Cristofani is an Italian surname that may refer to

- Bob Cristofani (1920–2002), Australian cricketer
- Leonora Fani (born Eleonora Cristofani in 1954), Italian film actress
- Mauro Cristofani (1941–1997), Italian linguist and researcher in Etruscan studies
