= Richard Whittington (disambiguation) =

Sir Richard Whittington (c. 1354–1423) was an English merchant and politician

Richard Whit(t)ington may also refer to:

- Richard Whittington (academic), academic in the area of corporate strategy
- Richard Whittington (diplomat) (1905–1975), British diplomat
- Richard Whittington (author) (1948–2011), British food writer
- Richard Whitington (1912–1984), Australian cricketer
- Richard Whittington, High Sheriff of Surrey (2016–17)

== See also ==
- Richard Whittington-Egan (1924–2016), Liverpool-born writer and criminologist
