= Alastair Little =

British chef (1950–2022)

- Born: 25 June 1950; Colne, Lancashire, England
- Died: 3 August 2022 (aged 72); Australia
- Education: Downing College, Cambridge
- Occupations: Chef, cookbook author and restaurateur
- Spouse: Sharon (m. 2000)
- Partner: Kirsten Pedersen (1984–1995)
- Children: 3

Alastair Little (25 June 1950 – 3 August 2022) was a British chef, cookbook author and restaurateur. He first became known in the 1980s for his eponymous Soho restaurant and frequent appearances on British television. His menus, which changed daily and featured seasonal produce, were influential in modern British restaurants.

== Early life and education ==
Little was born on 25 June 1950 in Colne, Lancashire, to Robert and Marion (née Irving). His father was an officer in the Royal Navy. His mother and grandmother were accomplished cooks, and the family had an allotment. At age 11 he entered Kirkham Grammar School, where the low quality of the food made him appreciate the food at home. He and his family travelled throughout western Europe, and he became interested in food and dining. His earliest gastronomic memory was the taste of homemade chicken broth with noodles in Limoges.

Little studied social anthropology and archaeology at Downing College, Cambridge, where he found the college food "horrible" but the wines "revelatory". In his final year he lived in a former friary and cooked in its kitchen, teaching himself using Elizabeth David's French Provincial Cooking and Julia Child's Mastering the Art of French Cooking. He began producing meals for groups of other students, including Rowley Leigh.

== Career ==
Little graduated in 1972 and planned to become a film editor; to break in to the industry he got a job as a messenger for a film studio in Soho. He supplemented his earnings as a waiter at Small's, a Knightsbridge cafe. His income from waiting at tables so far outstripped those as a messenger that he quit the messenger job to become a full-time waiter, and he eventually became assistant manager at Small's. According to Little, he watched the cooks and felt "envious"; at home he "worked [his] way through Robert Carrier's [Great] Dishes of the World".

In 1976, he was working at the Old Compton Wine Bar. When the chef quit, Little asked for the job. Out of necessity due to his inexperience professionally, he kept the menu simple. He recalls checking what was in the refrigerator each morning, then going shopping at the small produce markets and butchers in Soho. He moved to a restaurant in Wrentham, Suffolk, for two years, and then to one in Putney, and in 1981 he started at L'Escargot in Soho. He moved to 192 (Kensington Park Road), where he created simple menus that changed daily, a service model "unheard of back then", according to Sheila Dillon. He began studying Italian cuisine by reading Marcella Hazan's Classic Italian Cookbook. While at 192 he met Kirsten Pedersen and Mercedes Andre-Vega, who were waiting table there. The three of them opened the restaurant Alastair Little in Frith Street, Soho in October 1985. According to The Independent it was one of the first eponymous restaurants in Britain.

Soho's service model broke with multiple then-common dining norms. Little dispensed with cover charges and 'extras' for service and vegetables. The menu, which was restricted to soup, salad, fresh fish and meat, plus puddings, was changed twice a day, according to the availability of supplies. There were no tablecloths, the napkins were paper, and the kitchen could be seen from the dining room. Drew Smith of the Good Food Guide described it as "the finest cafe in the country".

Reviews were favourable. "Alastair gets more publicity than Princess Diana" said his fellow restaurateur Simon Slater.

In 1995, the partners opened a second restaurant, also named Alastair Little, off Ladbroke Grove in West London. The Times's restaurant critic Jonathan Meades described it as feeling "altogether right".

By 2002, Little had left the partnership, losing the right to use his name on another business. Little started a deli in Notting Hill, West London, called Tavola.

In 2017, Little moved to Sydney with his wife Sharon and opened a pop up restaurant "Little Bistro" inside the CBD Hotel, owned by the Merivale Group. He was the co-owner of restaurant Et Al in Potts Point, in the north of the Kings Cross area of Sydney.

In 2019, he started a home delivery service in London based on the dishes he had created for Tavola called 'ByAlastairLittle'.

== Impact ==
Little influenced the development of modern British cuisine. He has been called the 'godfather of modern British cooking'. According to Sheila Dillon he has "a place in British food history that is unchallengeable", saying he changed cooking professionally in Britain from "a default option for those who couldn't think of anything better to do" into "a craft that attracts good minds, skilled artisans, and even people who want to change the world". Dan Lepard said he "changed the way we eat food in Britain". Angela Hartnett said he "influenced the future of cooking". The Independent called his influence "as important as [Albert Roux and Michel Roux] and Marco Pierre White".

== Personal life and death ==
From 1984 to 1995, he was partner to Kirsten Pedersen, with whom he had two children. In 1995, while teaching in Umbria, he met Sharon, and in 2000 they married. He and Sharon, who is from Sydney, had one child.

Little died at home in Australia on 3 August 2022, at the age of 72.

== Publications ==
- Little, Alastair; Whittington, Richard (1993). Keep It Simple. Conran Octopus. ISBN 9781850295310.
- Little, Alastair; Whittington, Richard (1994). Alastair Little, keep it simple : a fresh look at classic cooking. Woodstock, N.Y.: Overlook Press. ISBN 0-87951-547-3. OCLC 30509620.
- Little, Alastair; Whittington, Richard (1995). Food of the Sun : a fresh look at Mediterranean cooking. London: Quadrille. ISBN 189998805X.
- Little, Alastair (1996). Alastair Little's Italian Kitchen : recipes from La Cacciata. London. ISBN 978-0091813659.
- Little, Alastair; Whittington, Richard (1998). The Daily Mail Modern British Cookbook: Over 500 Recipes, Advice and Kitchen Know-How. Fourth Estate. ISBN 978-1-85702-772-3.
- Little, Alastair (1999). Soho Cooking. Ebury. ISBN 978-0-09-186422-4.

== Other media ==
Throughout the 90s Little appeared on Masterchef (BBC1), Hot Chefs, and Ready Steady Cook (ITV). He was consultant on Lenny Henry's television show Chef!

In his later career, Little contributed food writing to both The Guardian newspaper and Noble Rot magazine.

In 2017 Little was the subject of an episode of BBC Radio 4's Food Programme hosted by broadcaster Sheila Dillon.

In 1998, photographer Barry Marsden took his portrait. The resulting black and white image now hangs in the National Portrait Gallery, London.

== Awards ==
In 1993, his restaurant won the Times Restaurant of Year award. His 1993 Keep It Simple won the Glenfiddich Award for Best Food Book of the Year.
