= Ron Saggers =

Australian cricketer (1917–1987)

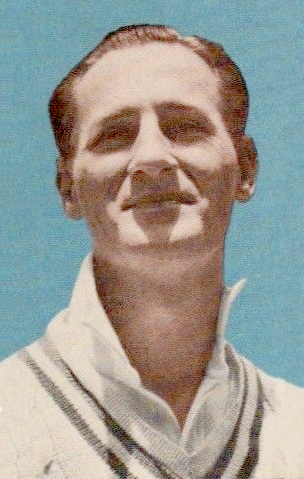
- Saggers in around 1948

Personal information
- Full name: Ronald Arthur Saggers
- Born: 15 May 1917; Marrickville, New South Wales, Australia
- Died: 13 May 1987 (aged 69); Harbord, New South Wales, Australia
- Batting: Right-handed
- Role: Wicket-keeper

International information
- National side: Australia
- Test debut (cap 182): 22 July 1948 v England
- Last Test: 3 March 1950 v South Africa

Domestic team information
- Years: Team
- 1939/40–1950/51: New South Wales

Career statistics
| Competition | Test | FC |
|---|---|---|
| Matches | 6 | 77 |
| Runs scored | 30 | 1,888 |
| Batting average | 10.00 | 23.89 |
| 100s/50s | 0/0 | 1/8 |
| Top score | 14 | 104* |
| Catches/stumpings | 16/8 | 146/75 |
- Source: CricketArchive, 25 February 2008

Ronald Arthur Saggers (15 May 1917 – 17 March 1987) was an Australian cricketer who played for New South Wales. He played briefly for the Australian team, playing six Tests between 1948 and 1950. In his Test cricket career he made 24 dismissals (16 catches and 8 stumpings) and scored 30 runs at an average of 10.00.

As a wicket-keeper, Saggers was "tidy and unobtrusive", and the understudy to Don Tallon on the 1948 Australian tour of England. The touring party, led by Donald Bradman in his last season, was nicknamed The Invincibles and was widely regarded as one of the strongest ever. Saggers played in the Test match at Headingley, where he took three catches, and his only other experience of Test cricket was on the tour to South Africa in 1949–50, in which Tallon did not take part. Saggers played in all five Tests and took 21 dismissals, but Tallon replaced him for the home Ashes series against England the following season.

In domestic cricket, Saggers twice captained New South Wales in 1948 when the regular captain, Arthur Morris, was playing for Australia, and overall played domestic cricket from 1939 until 1951.

== Domestic career ==
Saggers was born in the Sydney suburb of Marrickville in 1917. He married Margaret Heather (née Rankin) in Annandale in 1941. Outside cricket, Saggers worked in the insurance industry.

=== Early career ===
Saggers played twice for the New South Wales Colts team against Queensland Colts in 1937, before making his first-class debut against South Australia at the Sydney Cricket Ground halfway through the season in January 1940. Selected as a specialist batsman—future Services player Stan Sismey kept wicket—Saggers made 45 and 57 batting at number six in his debut match, and went on to make two more first-class appearances before the end of the season, ending with 208 runs at an average of 34.66 and three catches behind the stumps.

His first full season from 1940 to 1941 saw him play in eight matches, scoring 413 runs with the bat at 29.50 and passing fifty runs in an innings twice. His first match was away against Queensland where he scored 22 and 45, making three stumpings, taking one catch and performing one run out, followed by scores of one and 33 in the home match, together with two stumpings. He scored 35 and four at home against Victoria, and then 45 in the second innings of the away match. On 22 November 1940, barely a year into Saggers' career, New South Wales faced a combined Queensland-Victoria team at Brisbane. Saggers scored 58 as his team reached 429 in response to the oppositions 202 all out. In the Queensland-Victoria team's second innings, where they reached 416, Saggers equalled the world record for most dismissals in an innings, taking seven catches. Saggers then went on to score 47 against South Australia, and 68 against Queensland on 1 January 1941. In his final match before the outbreak of World War II, Saggers scored 63 runs against South Australia. He ended the season with 18 catches with the gloves and 13 stumpings.

=== World War II ===
Between 1941 and 1942, Saggers' career was interrupted when he enlisted in the Royal Australian Air Force (RAAF) on 6 December 1941 at Sydney. He served at the Elementary Flight School as Leading Aircraftman RA Saggers 421043, until his discharge on 29 July 1942, Saggers did not return to domestic cricket in Australia until 1945, however. In the 1945–1946 season, he played in seven matches, scoring 168 runs at 21.00 and taking 12 catches and five stumpings. He then suffered a drop in form with the bat; in 1946–1947 he scored only 176 runs at 17.60 from eight matches. However, he remained effective as a wicket-keeper with 16 catches and seven stumpings. His batting form returned in 1947–1948, scoring 298 runs from 10 matches at 27.09, reaching the 90s for the first time. He also enjoyed a very successful season with the gloves, a career high of 21 catches and four stumpings.

=== Return ===
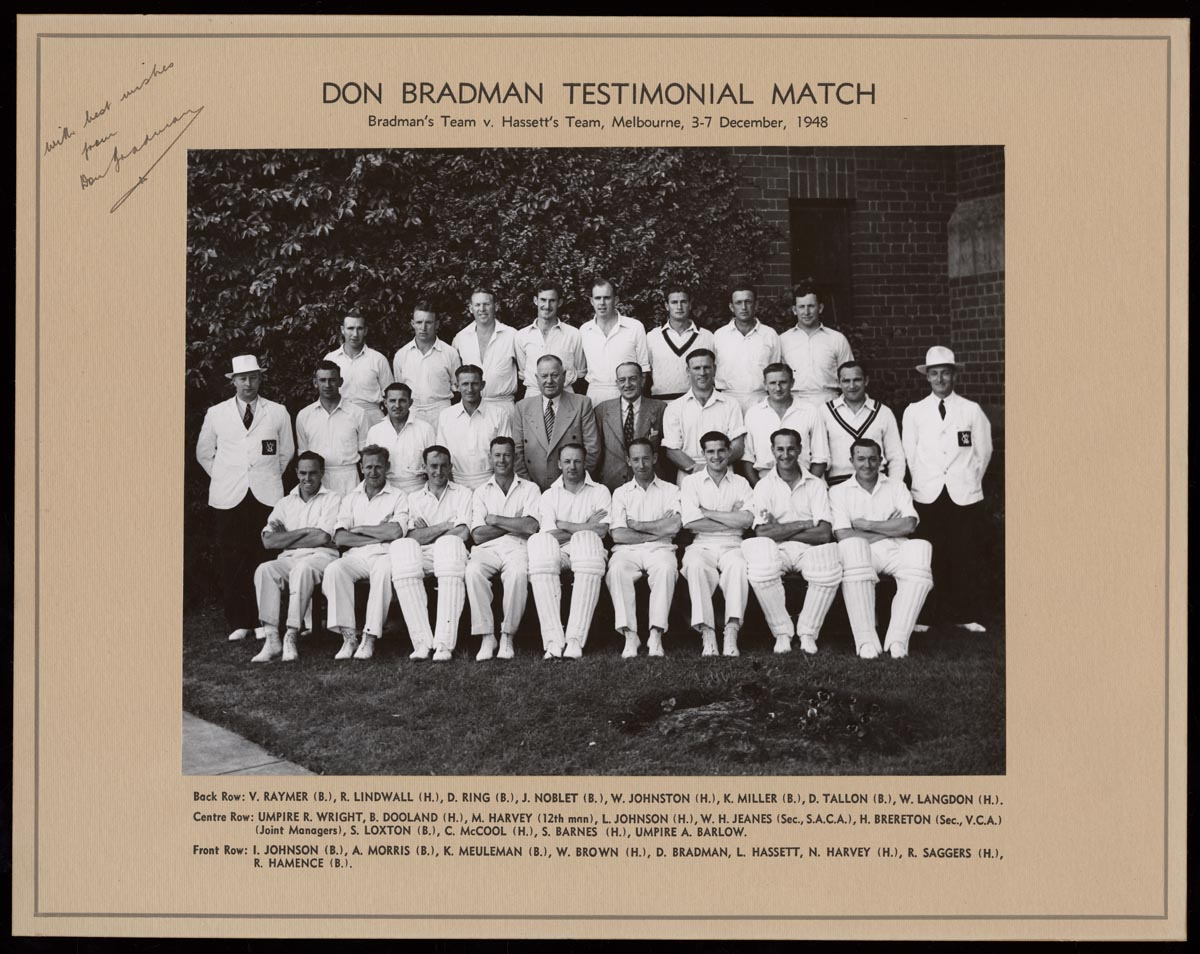
Saggers played in Don Bradman's Testimonial Match

Saggers was in stronger form following his tour to England. On 10 December 1948, Saggers, included in AL Hassett's XI for Test trial matches and benefits, as well as continuing his career at New South Wales, scored 38 for the latter against Queensland. At the same time, he aided Jack Moroney in his own comeback to cricket at New South Wales by suggesting he subtract three years from his age when he submitted his registration form. Overall in the 1948–1949 season he scored 300 runs from nine matches, his highest season total, at 25.00, and taking 21 catches and six stumpings. Following the South Africa tour of 1949–1950 he returned to Australia again for one final season from 1950 to 1951, however played only one match, scoring five runs and taking two catches. Through his entire first-class career of 77 appearances from 1939 until 1951, he was to make one century in a tour match against Essex and eight half-centuries for New South Wales, ending with 1,888 runs at an average of 23.89, together with 146 catches and 75 stumpings.

== International career ==
=== The Invincibles ===
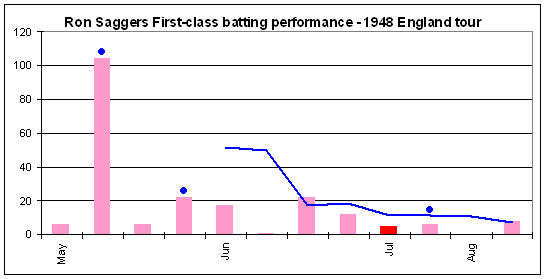
A chart showing Saggers's batting performance during the tour. The runs scored per innings are represented by the bars, with the red bars being Test innings and the pink bars being other first-class innings. The blue line is the average of the five most recent innings and the dots indicate not outs.

Saggers accompanied the 1948 Ashes tour to England as the reserve wicket-keeper behind the first choice, Tallon. During the tour, Saggers had few opportunities with the bat, generally batting between No. 8 and No. 10,^{N-}^{[4]} because Australia's frontline bowlers included the likes of Ray Lindwall, Colin McCool, Ian Johnson and Doug Ring, who were all capable batsmen. Lindwall scored two Test centuries in his career, while McCool scored 18 first-class centuries, one in Tests. Johnson and Ring both scored more than 20 fifties at first-class level. As a result, many of the bowlers batted before he did.

As Australia often won by an innings, and declared in the first innings on many occasions, Saggers only had 12 innings in his 17 first-class fixtures and was not out three times after his remaining partners had been dismissed. In the first County match against Leicestershire he scored six and took two catches, and against Cambridge University he made two stumpings and took one catch. He then played in the match against Essex where Australia reached 721 runs. Saggers made his highest first-class score, 104 not out—the only first-class century of his career—in a partnership of 166 runs in 65 minutes with Sam Loxton. Loxton, along with Bill Brown and Donald Bradman, also scored centuries. He then faced Oxford University, scoring six runs and taking one catch, followed by 22 and a stumping at Lancashire, 17 and another stumping at Hampshire, 22 against Yorkshire, 12 and four stumpings against Surrey, and three more stumpings against Gloucestershire.

Saggers' Test debut took place at Headingley on 22 July 1948 during the Fourth Test of the Invincibles Ashes tour of England. England made 496 runs in their first innings, with Saggers taking catches to remove Denis Compton for 23 and Jim Laker for four. Australia replied with 458, however Saggers was stumped by England's wicket-keeper Godfrey Evans off the bowling of Laker for only five runs. England's second innings reached 365 with Saggers taking one catch to secure the wicket of Ken Cranston. However, an innings of 182 runs from Arthur Morris and 173 not out from Bradman meant that Saggers was not required to bat again in the second innings; Australia defeating England by seven wickets. Saggers did not play in the remaining international matches of the 1948 Ashes series, and he ended the tour with 209 runs at an average of 23.22, including a career high score of 104 not out against Essex, 23 catches and 20 stumpings, also career records. This compared with the first-choice gloveman Tallon, who scored 283 runs at 25.72. In all his matches on tour, Tallon missed 249 byes as Australia conceded 5,331 runs, a bye percentage of 4.67%. In contrast, Saggers conceded 221 byes from the 6,190 runs scored against Australia when he was behind the stumps, a percentage of 3.57%.^{N-}^{[4]} In his book, Farewell to Cricket, Bradman said of Saggers following the tour: "[he] had not quite the speed or agility of Tallon but could always be relied on for a solid performance. A most polished and unostentatious player."

=== South Africa ===
Saggers' next Test came in the 1949 tour of South Africa, where he was Australia's first choice wicket-keeper for all five Test matches. In light of the successful 1948 tour of England, Saggers commented "give me South Africa now, but I wouldn't care to insure her future at double the rate I'd insure Australia's." In the first warm up match against Natal Saggers scored 17 and took four catches, and in the second against North Eastern Transvaal he took one catch and made two stumpings, but was not needed to bat in either innings. He made 32 runs with three stumpings and three catches against the South African XI, made two stumpings but did not bat against the Orange Free State, and then scored one and nought not out against the Transvaal.

The first Test match of the tour, on 24 December 1949 at Johannesburg, saw him score 14 runs in the first innings before falling leg before wicket (LBW) to Cuan McCarthy, and taking three catches as South Africa were forced to follow on, Australia winning by an innings and 85 runs. In the Second Test at Cape Town, Saggers did get a chance to bat, with Australia declaring for 526 before he had the opportunity in the first innings. South Africa were forced to follow-on (bat twice in a row) and were defeated by eight wickets. He did, however, complete three stumpings in South Africa's first innings off the bowling of Colin McCool, along with four catches in the match. He also took two catches and completed one stumping in the Third Test, and made two runs in the first innings, though he did not bat in the second as Australia won by five wickets. The Fourth Test, again in Johannesburg, saw Saggers score five not out in the first innings and, though not being required to bat in the second innings as the match ended in a draw, taking two catches.

The Fifth Test was played at the Crusaders Ground at St. George's Park in Port Elizabeth on 3 to 6 March 1950. Scoring four not out in the first innings, Saggers took two catches and completed four stumpings as South Africa were bowled out for 158 and 132 chasing Australia's first innings 549. With this innings and 259 run victory, Australia won the test series 4–0, however Saggers would not play for his national team again upon the return of Tallon. Saggers was caught once, stumped once and out leg before wicket once but was never bowled in his international career. He ended his final year as an international player with 111 runs in first-class cricket overall at 13.87, taking 30 catches and 20 stumpings, both of which were the highest he attained in one calendar year. He was replaced again by Tallon, however his form in turn declined and he was replaced by Gil Langley for the 1952 series against the West Indies. He retired from first class cricket in 1951, and died in Harbord, New South Wales in 1987.

== Test match performance ==
| | | Batting | | | | Wicket-keeping | | | |
| Opposition | Matches | Runs | Average | High Score | 100 / 50 | Catches | Stumpings | Dismissals per innings | Most dismissals (Inns) |
|---|---|---|---|---|---|---|---|---|---|
| England | 1 | 5 | 5.00 | 5 | 0/0 | 3 | 0 | 1.50 | 2 |
| South Africa | 5 | 25 | 12.50 | 14 | 0/0 | 13 | 8 | 2.33 | 4 |
| Overall | 6 | 30 | 10.00 | 14 | 0/0 | 16 | 8 | 2.18 | 4 |

== See also ==
- List of Australian wicket-keepers
- List of New South Wales representative cricketers
