= Dick Pollard =

English cricketer (1912–1985)

Personal information
- Full name: Richard Pollard
- Born: 19 June 1912; Westhoughton, Lancashire, England
- Died: 16 December 1985 (aged 73); Westhoughton, Greater Manchester, England
- Batting: Right-handed
- Bowling: Right-arm fast-medium
- Role: Bowler

International information
- National side: England
- Test debut (cap 314): 20 July 1946 v India
- Last Test: 27 July 1948 v Australia

Domestic team information
- Years: Team
- 1933–1950: Lancashire

Career statistics
Competition	Test	FC
Matches	4	298
Runs scored	13	3,522
Batting average	13.00	13.29
100s/50s	0/0	0/7
Top score	10*	63
Balls bowled	1102	62,484
Wickets	15	1,122
Bowling average	25.20	22.56
5 wickets in innings	1	60
10 wickets in match	0	10
Best bowling	5/24	8/33
Catches/stumpings	3/–	225/–
- Source: CricketArchive, 18 December 2008

Richard Pollard (19 June 1912 – 16 December 1985) was an English cricketer born in Westhoughton, Lancashire, who played in four Test matches between 1946 and 1948. A fast-medium right-arm bowler and a lower-order right-handed batsman who made useful runs on occasion, he played for Lancashire between 1933 and 1950, taking 1,122 wickets in 298 first-class matches; he is 10th highest wicket-taker for Lancashire.

A big and heavy man, he was known as a hard worker and, according to his obituary in Wisden in 1986, "his reputation as a great trier commended him to the Lancashire public". Season after season, Wisden referred to Pollard's accuracy and reliability, and his ability to bowl long spells without apparently tiring.

== Early career ==
Pollard made his first-class debut for Lancashire in August 1933 against Nottinghamshire; while batting at number 11 he scored 16 not out, and took the wicket of Nottinghamshire captain Arthur Carr. In Lancashire's County Championship-winning side of 1934, he was seen as a medium-paced reserve to the front-line bowlers, but injuries, particularly to Frank Sibbles, meant that he played 11 matches in the last two months of the season, and took 38 wickets in them at an average of 19.31. In the second innings of a match against Gloucestershire, Pollard took 6 wickets for 21 runs. Wisden reported that "He kept a fine length and made the ball turn quickly with great effect". It was his best bowling at the time, beating his previous best of 2/31. In Championship games, he made only 14 runs in total, but in the end-of-season Champion County v The Rest match at The Oval, he scored 27 not out in the first innings and 28 in the second. The Rest were made of players from counties other than the current champions.

Injuries to Sibbles and to Frank Booth gave Pollard an opportunity to play 23 matches in 1935, and was awarded his county cap. Wisden noted how well he compensated for the loss of the senior bowlers: "With length, fair pace and swerve, Pollard proved so successful that, no doubt, he would have taken a hundred wickets for the County had not tonsilitis caused his retirement from the Somerset match." In fact, by playing for The Rest against the new County Champions, Yorkshire and taking three wickets in the game, he reached exactly 100 wickets for the season. Earlier in the season, in the match against Kent at Dover, he had improved his best innings figures to 7/87 and taken 10 wickets in a match for the first time, finishing with 11/176.

== Front-line county bowler ==
Age and injuries caused the decline of many of Lancashire's cricketers in 1936, and the county finished 11th in the County Championship, equalling its lowest ever position to that date. Pollard was exempted from the criticisms in Wisden – he "improved a little", it said. In all games, he took 108 wickets at an average of 20.13. He improved his best bowling figures twice in different matches against Glamorgan: he took 7/57 in the away match at Cardiff and followed that with 8/42 in the return match at Old Trafford. There was also progress in batting: he hit 58 not out in the match against Surrey at Old Trafford, and followed that with 55 in the return match at The Oval. The 1936 season was the only one in which he passed 50 runs in an innings more than once.

Pollard's record in the three immediate pre-war seasons, 1937–1939 indicate his reliability. In the three seasons, he took, respectively, 112, 149, and 111 wickets, with 1938 being the most prolific season in his career. For most of these three years, his new-ball partner was Eddie Phillipson, who was very similar in style and pace. They both relied on accuracy rather than speed, using the seam of the ball, and generating some swing. Phillipson was injured for part of 1938, which put more work on to Pollard and to a degree explains his high tally of wickets. In that season too, Pollard was picked for a Test trial match between England and The Rest. Playing for The Rest, he produced figures of 5/57 in England's innings of 377, but it did not lead to a Test call-up. However, he was picked for the Gentlemen v Players match at Lord's.

== Post-war Test player ==
Like many of his generation, Pollard lost significant cricket years to the Second World War. Unlike some, though, he had a relatively swift return to first-class cricket when the war ended, and he was picked for four of the five "Victory Tests" arranged between England and the Australian Services teams across the summer of 1945. Identified as "Sergeant R. Pollard" in Wisden, he was the leading wicket-taker on either side, with 25 wickets. In his first game, the second of the series after the Australians had won the first, he was upstaged in the first innings by fellow opening bowler George Pope, who took 5/58. But Wisden noted that "the most damaging blow was a beautiful ball by Pollard which took Hassett's middle stump". And in the second innings, Pollard's 5/76 outshone Pope's 3/69. His figures were even better in the next match: 6/75 in the Australians' first innings. And he took four wickets in an innings in both the fourth and fifth matches of the series.

Although Pollard had played several matches in 1945, he was not yet discharged from the forces, and this limited his appearances in the first full season for first-class cricket in 1946. He managed only 12 County Championship matches for Lancashire, though he took 55 wickets in those games. He did, though, finally play his first Test match: the second match of the three-Test series against India. The previous week, he had played in the annual Gentlemen v Players match and had taken nine wickets in the game for just 53 runs. During this match, he spent a period off the ground negotiating with his Army chiefs his availability for the Old Trafford Test. In the Test itself, he had a sensational start. After the Indians had reached 124 without loss on the second day of the match, Pollard caused a collapse with a spell of four wickets for seven runs in five overs. In the innings as a whole, which ended with India all out for 170, he finished with 5/24 off 27 overs, 16 of which were maidens. In the second innings he took two further wickets for 63 runs.

That performance earned Pollard selection for the 1946–47 Ashes tour, and he and Bill Voce were given special leave from the Army to make the tour. But, Wisden wrote, "neither had sufficient pace to be really troublesome in the clear Australian atmosphere". Pollard's 28 wickets on the tour as a whole cost more than 36 runs each, and he did not feature in the Tests in Australia, although he won his second cap in a rain-affected single Test in New Zealand, when he took three wickets for 73 runs. Having arrived from a country that had had seven years of rationing Australia was a 'land flowing with milk and honey' and Pollard soon put on two stone (28 lbs) in weight. He was out of the reckoning for Test places in the hot summer of 1947 but responded with one of his best county seasons. For Lancashire in Championship matches, he took 131 wickets, with the next best total being 74. In all matches, he took 144 wickets at an average just below 20 runs per wicket, the second best figures of his career. The season produced both his career-best bowling performance and his highest first-class score. The two feats came in consecutive matches, both at Old Trafford. First, in the match against Derbyshire, he made 63, the only time he passed 60 in his career; he shared a seventh wicket partnership of 148 with Alan Wharton. Then in the next game against Northamptonshire, bowling unchanged in the first innings with Phillipson, he took 8/33.

The 1948 tour of England by the Australian team captained by Donald Bradman, and subsequently labelled The Invincibles, provided convincing evidence of the weakness in international terms of English cricket at the time. Two heavy defeats in the first two Test matches led to a recall for Pollard, then 36 years old, for the third match, which was played at Old Trafford. The move was a success, for England were well on top until rain intervened and the match ended in a draw. Pollard's most significant contribution as a batsman in Tests was a "full-blooded pull" from the off spin of Ian Johnson, which caught the Australian opening batsman Sid Barnes, who was fielding at short leg on the edge of the pitch, under the ribs. Barnes was carried off on a stretcher, batted low in the Australian order and then had to retire hurt. He spent 10 days in hospital after the match and missed the next Test. The Australians were made uncomfortable by the accuracy of Alec Bedser and Pollard. Pollard's three wickets included Bradman, leg before wicket for just seven runs. The draw at Old Trafford encouraged the selectors to persevere with the same fast-medium combination in the fourth Test, at Leeds, but in a high scoring match on a good pitch the lack of spin bowling was decisive. Pollard's contribution was to take, in the space of three balls in the first innings, the wickets of Hassett and Bradman, the latter bowled for 33. But that was the extent of his success, and Australia made 404 for three wickets to win the match, at the time the highest total to win a Test match. For the final match of the series at The Oval, on what was seen as very definitely a pitch that was more suited to spin than quick bowling, Pollard was the bowler dropped to make way for an extra spin bowler.

He did not play Test cricket again, but there was a short codicil 54 years later. In 2002, the ball used by Pollard to bowl Bradman for 33 in the fourth Test in 1948 was sold for £1,700 at auction.

== Final cricket years ==
Lancashire's reliance on Pollard lessened during the 1948 season, when his County Championship total of 95 wickets was only eight ahead of the slow left-arm bowler William Roberts. In all matches, he took 116 wickets at an average of 23, and he bowled more overs, close to 1,300, than in any other first-class season.

The following season, though, he bowled 400 fewer overs and took only 73 wickets in all, at the relatively high cost of 28 runs per wicket. The Lancashire team regularly included several new, younger bowlers, and many of them – Roy Tattersall, Malcolm Hilton, Bob Berry – were spin bowlers (though Tattersall started as a swing bowler). Pollard continued to open the bowling and was as accurate as ever, but was less successful than in other seasons. He was given a benefit in August 1949 by Lancashire and picked the match against Derbyshire, which raised £8,035, the third highest total at the time. In 1950, after a few matches with little bowling success, Pollard was dropped, and Lancashire started using Hilton, the fastest of three slow left-arm bowlers, to open the bowling in some matches. At the end of the season, in which Lancashire shared the County Championship title with Surrey, Pollard retired from first-class cricket to move into Lancashire League cricket.

That was not quite the end of the first-class career as in 1952, Pollard played one further match for a Commonwealth XI against the Indian touring team. He took three wickets in the match, made two catches and 17 runs.
