= Graham Williams (Australian cricketer) =

Australian cricketer

- Warrant Officer R. G. Williams

Personal information
- Full name: Robert Graham Williams
- Born: 4 April 1911; St Peters, Adelaide, South Australia
- Died: 31 August 1978 (aged 67); Adelaide, South Australia
- Height: 1.95 m (6 ft 5 in)
- Batting: Right-handed
- Bowling: Right-arm fast-medium

Domestic team information
- Years: Team
- 1932-33 to 1937-38: South Australia

Career statistics
Competition	First-class
Matches	26
Runs scored	531
Batting average	16.09
100s/50s	0/2
Top score	75 not out
Balls bowled	4625
Wickets	67
Bowling average	29.20
5 wickets in innings	3
10 wickets in match	0
Best bowling	6/21
Catches/stumpings	12/–
- Source: Cricinfo, 24 December 2019

Robert Graham Williams MBE (4 April 1911 – 31 August 1978) was an Australian cricketer who played first-class cricket for South Australia from 1933 to 1938 and the Australian Services team in 1945. He was awarded the MBE for his services to his fellow prisoners of war during World War II.

== Life and career ==
=== Before World War II ===
Graham Williams was born in the Adelaide suburb of St Peters, and attended Prince Alfred College. When he left school he studied at the South Australian School of Mines and Industries, graduating in 1934 as a wool-classer. He worked in Adelaide with the firm Goldsbrough Mort & Co.

A tall fast-medium bowler and useful lower-order batsman, Williams had his best season for South Australia in 1937–38, when he took 24 wickets at an average of 24.20 and made 233 runs at 21.18. He also recorded his best bowling figures in that season, when he took 6 for 21 against Queensland on Christmas Day 1937.

He spent most of 1938 in Bradford, Yorkshire, broadening his knowledge of the wool trade. While there he played with some success for Bradford in the Bradford Cricket League.

=== War service and later ===
Williams enlisted in the Royal Australian Air Force in April 1940. Warrant-Officer Navigator Williams was taken prisoner in July 1941 after his plane was shot down over Libya, and was released in April 1945. While imprisoned he learned braille so he could teach it to blind prisoners. He also taught agriculture, economics and touch typing in the prison camps. In 1946 he was awarded the MBE for his services to his fellow prisoners.

Despite having lost 31 kilograms during his imprisonment, less than a month after his release Williams was playing cricket for an RAAF team against an Empire XI at Lord's. The 15,000-strong crowd, knowing his war record, gave him a standing ovation when he went in to bat. His RAAF teammate Keith Miller described the moment as "the most touching moment I have ever seen or heard, almost orchestral in its sound and feeling". He played for services teams throughout the 1945 season, including all five of the Victory Tests between Australian servicemen and England.

He married Josephine Simpson in Adelaide in January 1946. His Services XI teammate Albert Cheetham was his best man. He resumed his work with Goldsbrough Mort after the war.
