= Mick Roper =

Australian cricketer

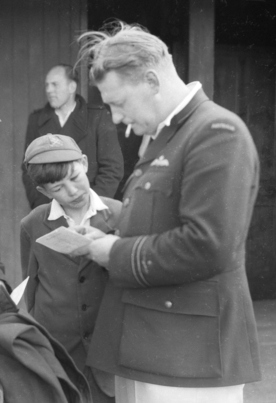
- Roper in 1945

Personal information
- Full name: Arthur William Roper
- Born: 20 February 1917; Petersham, Sydney, New South Wales, Australia
- Died: 4 September 1972 (aged 55); Woy Woy, New South Wales, Australia
- Batting: Right-handed
- Bowling: Right-arm fast-medium

Domestic team information
- Years: Team
- 1939/40: New South Wales
- 1945–1945/46: Australian Services

Career statistics
Competition	First-class
Matches	11
Runs scored	102
Batting average	6.80
100s/50s	0/0
Top score	28
Balls bowled	503
Wickets	13
Bowling average	38.69
5 wickets in innings	0
10 wickets in match	0
Best bowling	2/9
Catches/stumpings	11/–
- Source: Cricinfo, 24 January 2017

Arthur William "Mick" Roper (20 February 1917 – 4 September 1972) was an Australian cricketer. He played eleven first-class matches, two for New South Wales in 1939–40 and the remaining nine for the Australian Services cricket team in the period after the end of the Second World War. Roper was a fighter pilot in No. 455 Squadron RAAF stationed in Scotland during the war.
