= Eddy Williams =

Australian cricketer

Personal information
- Born: 18 September 1915; Melbourne, Australia
- Died: 17 January 2008 (aged 92); Melbourne, Australia

Domestic team information
- Years: Team
- 1936: Victoria
- Source: Cricinfo, 22 November 2015

Eddy Williams (18 September 1915 – 17 January 2008) was an Australian cricketer. He played one first-class cricket match for Victoria in 1936.

== See also ==
- List of Victoria first-class cricketers
