= Jim Workman =

Australian cricketer

Personal information
- Full name: James Allen Workman
- Born: 17 March 1917; Peterhead, Adelaide, South Australia
- Died: 23 December 1970 (aged 53); Westminster, London, England
- Batting: Right-handed

Career statistics
Competition	First-class
Matches	16
Runs scored	549
Batting average	20.33
100s/50s	0/4
Top score	76
Balls bowled	8
Wickets	1
Bowling average	6.00
5 wickets in innings	0
10 wickets in match	0
Best bowling	1/6
Catches/stumpings	5/–
- Source: Cricinfo, 24 December 2019

James Allen Workman (17 March 1917 – 23 December 1970) was an Australian cricketer who played first-class cricket for the Australian Services team from May 1945 to January 1946.

After the war he married an English woman, and they lived in London, where he coached at Alf Gover's cricket school. He died suddenly on his way home from work on 23 December 1970.
