= Reg Ellis (cricketer, born 1917) =

Australian cricketer

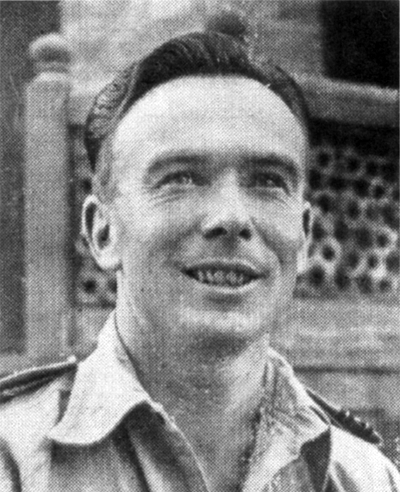

Personal information
- Full name: Reginald Sidney Ellis
- Born: 26 November 1917; Light Pass, South Australia
- Died: 21 June 2015 (aged 97); Adelaide, South Australia
- Batting: Left-handed
- Bowling: Slow left-arm orthodox

Career statistics
Competition	First-class
Matches	21
Runs scored	47
Batting average	2.93
100s/50s	0/0
Top score	10 not out
Balls bowled	4776
Wickets	78
Bowling average	26.53
5 wickets in innings	6
10 wickets in match	1
Best bowling	6/144
Catches/stumpings	6/–
- Source: Cricinfo, 8 April 2022
- Military career
- Allegiance: Australia
- Branch: Royal Australian Air Force
- Service years: 1940–1945
- Rank: Flight lieutenant
- Unit: No. 463 Squadron RAAF

Reginald Sidney Ellis (26 November 1917 – 21 June 2015) was an Australian pilot, flying instructor and cricketer.

Ellis was a pilot in the Royal Australian Air Force during World War II, flying Lancaster bombers. He flew 11 sorties over occupied Europe. He ranked as a flight lieutenant and was part of No. 463 Squadron RAAF. He also served as a flying instructor in the UK during the war, and continued after the war as a flying instructor with the Royal Aero Club of South Australia.

Ellis played in the Victory Tests in England between ex-servicemen of Australia and England immediately after World War II, and then toured India and Australia with the Australian Services XI. He also played one first-class match for South Australia in 1945/46.

A left-arm orthodox spin bowler, Ellis was the most successful of the Services' bowlers in the matches in England, taking 23 wickets at an average of 19.13, with a best performance of 5 for 43 and 5 for 24 in the final match in Scarborough. Later, he took 5 for 25 and 3 for 32 when the Services XI beat Ceylon by an innings. His best figures were 6 for 144 for the Services XI against New South Wales in January 1946.

The last surviving member of the Services XI, Ellis was guest of honour at Sachin Tendulkar's Bradman Oration in Canberra in 2011. He died in June 2015, aged 97.

== See also ==
- List of South Australian representative cricketers
