= Richard Whittington (author) =

British food writer (1948–2011)

Richard Whittington (12 February 1948 – 3 January 2011), was a British food writer.

== Early life ==
Whittington was born on 12 February 1948, in Bury St Edmunds, Suffolk, England, to Jeffery and Florence Whittington, the youngest of four children. He attended Essex University for a year, studying American literature, but left to begin a career in journalism.

At the age of 25, he was diagnosed with multiple sclerosis, and in his last 20 years he required the use of a wheelchair.

== Personal life ==
In 1969, he met and married Jane Eckersley. They had a son, and split up in 1972. His second wife, Pippa Steel, died in 1992.

Whittington died on 3 January 2011, aged 62.

== Publications ==
- Keep It Simple. Conran Octopus. 1993. ISBN 9781850295310. With Alastair Little.
- Food of the Sun. 1995. With Alastair Little
- Quaglino's 1996, Overlook Press. With Martin Webb
- The (Daily Mail) Modern British Cookbook. 1998. With Alastair Little
