= New Zealand Services cricket team in England in 1945 =

International cricket tour

The New Zealand Services cricket team played 35 matches in England during the 1945 season between late May and mid-September.

== The tour ==
Only one match, against H.D.G. Leveson-Gower's XI at Scarborough, was counted as first-class and the team played three times at Lord's. Several of the one- and two-day matches were written up in Wisden Cricketers' Almanack for 1946. In February 2017, a retrospective account of all known tour games was recorded in the book Overshadowed: The New Zealand Services Cricket Team in England 1945 by Rob Franks.

The side was captained by Ken James, who had toured England as a wicketkeeper with the 1927 and 1931 New Zealand teams, and played for Northamptonshire in the late 1930s as a professional. Other former and future Test players in the team at different times included Stewie Dempster, Ted Badcock, Martin Donnelly, Roger Blunt and Alex Moir. Tom Pritchard, who played county cricket for Warwickshire for several seasons from 1946, was also a member of the New Zealand Services side.

In addition to the former Test cricketers living in England during wartime, a range of players were called upon to join the team, including airmen from RNZAF; sailors from RNZN; ex-POWs and army servicemen based in England during the summer of 1945. Over 20 (former or future) first-class cricketers represented the New Zealand Services team.

== First-class match ==
The one first-class match against Leveson-Gower's XI was lost by eight wickets. Donnelly scored 100 in the first innings and 86 in the second, and Badcock took six for 166 against a side that included several England Test players. But Len Hutton scored 188 and though the New Zealanders declared their second innings with the game apparently saved, Leveson-Gower's XI hit 63 in 25 minutes to win.

== Sources ==
Rob Franks, Overshadowed: The New Zealand Services Cricket Team in England 1945, 2017

== Annual reviews ==
- Wisden Cricketers Almanack 1946
