= Food Programme =

Plan to improve Soviet agriculture

The Food Programme was an initiative to enhance and improve the conditions of Soviet agriculture by improving the planning mechanism during the Eleventh Five-Year Plan (1981–1985) and Twelfth Five-Year Plan (1986–1990).

== The Programme ==
Leonid Brezhnev, the General Secretary of the Communist Party of the Soviet Union and Chairman of the Presidium of the Supreme Soviet, told the November 1981 Central Committee plenum that work had begun on a new food programme. On 24 May 1982 Brezhnev told a Central Committee plenum that the goal of the new Food Programme was to enhance, and improve, productivity and output of Soviet agriculture. The basic elements of the planning mechanism and its administrative and organisational features of Soviet agriculture remained unchanged. The bureaucracy was reorganised to improve efficiency by establishing new institutions and investing more money on agriculture in the form of procurement prices. The Soviet Government would build roads, cultural facilities and consumer services close to unproductive farms to increase their productivity. This increased expenditure amounted to 30 billion rubles in 1983, and food subsidy on meat, milk, bread and potatoes increased by around 51 million rubles. In other words, when a Soviet consumer bought agricultural products, it would be less than half of what the Soviet Government invested on transporting the goods from the farms to the consumer facilities. The Food Programme was initiated in 1982 and would end in 1990 at the end of the Twelfth Five-Year Plan.

Mikhail Gorbachev, the then Central Committee Secretary Responsible for Agriculture, tried to establish nationwide committees which would oversee the reform's implementation. Nikolai Tikhonov, the Chairman of the Council of Ministers, objected to this, believing that the central ministries were fit to handle the reform's implementation themselves. According to Martin McCauley, the author behind Gorbachev, Tikhonov objected because he believed Gorbachev was trying to take his place as Council of Ministers chairman.

During Brezhnev's November 1981 speech many Sovietologists thought that the Food Programme would decrease bureaucratic interference in Soviet agriculture. This, as was later proven, was far from the intended goal. While he did talk about "strengthening" the collective and state farms, he never said he would allow them to decide what to produce and how to produce it for instance. Instead of giving the farmers more independence, Brezhnev announced the establishment of two new bureaucratic layers. The first, the Agro-Industrial Associations, at the district, territory, province and autonomous level of governance would function as a "full-fledged and democratic management agency". Industrial commissions were established at the republic and union level.

== Fulfillment ==
The Food Programme, which was ridiculed in the First World, increased grain yields between 1981 and 1986 by 3.4 percent, an increase from 1.9 percent for the period of 1965 to 1980. Agricultural output decreased in the period of 1986 to 1990, making the fulfillment of the Food Programme's goals unattainable.

== Bibliography ==
- Johnson, David Gale; Brooks, Karen McConnell (1983). Prospects for Soviet Agriculture in the 1980s. Indiana University Press. ISBN 978-0-253-34619-3.
