= Frank Sibbles =

English cricketer

Personal information
- Full name: Frank Marshall Sibbles
- Born: 15 March 1904; Werneth, Oldham, England
- Died: 20 July 1973 (aged 69); Bramhall, Stockport, England
- Batting: Right-handed
- Bowling: Right-arm off-spin
- Role: Bowler

Domestic team information
- Years: Team
- 1925–1937: Lancashire

Career statistics
Competition	First-class
Matches	315
Runs scored	3,478
Batting average	14.46
100s/50s	0/12
Top score	71*
Balls bowled	21,087
Wickets	940
Bowling average	22.43
5 wickets in innings	41
10 wickets in match	4
Best bowling	8/24
Catches/stumpings	181/–
- Source: Cricinfo, 16 February 2009

Frank Marshall Sibbles (15 March 1904 in Oldham, Lancashire – 20 July 1973 in Bramhall, Cheshire) was a bowler who represented Lancashire in first-class cricket from 1925 to 1937. He was part of the team which won the County Championship in 1927 when he took 97 wickets at an average of 26.9. He also took his career best 8/24 during that season when he was selected for the Test trial. His best season was 1932 when he took 131 wickets at an average of 18.25 taking 5 wickets in an innings on eleven occasions.

He started off playing cricket for Werneth Cricket Club in the Central Lancashire Cricket League. It was during this period that he was chosen to represent Lancashire as a replacement for Cecil Parkin, who had left the club to play league cricket. As well as bowling off spin, Sibbles sometimes bowled medium pace and using off-cutters, regularly opened the bowling for Lancashire in the 1930s. In his final season for Lancashire, Sibbles' bowling was affected by a knee injury and he was forced to retire. According to Wisden, he was "one of the most consistent cricketers without a major representative honour to his name".

After retiring from playing, Sibbles joined the Lancashire committee, and at one point was a member of the board of selectors which chose the Lancashire team. On 20 July 1973, Sibbles died suddenly at his home in Bramhall, although he had been ill for several years.
