= Dick Whittington (photographer) =

American photographer and photography studio owner

Wayne "Dick" Whittington was a Los Angeles photography studio owner, whose photographic career extended from the 1932 Olympic games, to the first 'wired' photograph transmissions from the Rose Bowl.

== Early life ==
Wayne "Dick" Whittington was a Los Angeles native, and a student at USC. He first established a photography studio in the garage of his house, near the USC campus. Later, after World War II, he located his business premises in downtown Los Angeles.

== Career ==
Whittington founded the Dick Whittington Studio.

"The "Dick" Whittington Studio was the largest and finest photography studio in the Los Angeles area from 1924 to 1987."

Among Whittington's innovations were the setting up of a mobile laboratory, that made it possible to transmit photographs from a Rose Bowl football game directly to newspapers and wire services. He captured many images of the 1932 Summer Olympics, and of the early air races at Mines Field. Over his sixty-year career, Whittington and his staff created many millions of negatives; these are now archived at California State University, Long Beach, and the Huntington Library in San Marino.

== Personal life ==
Whittington is survived by his son Edward, three grandchildren, and three great-grandchildren.

== Legacy ==
The Dick Whittington Studio archives are divided between the University of Southern California and the Huntington Library.
