= Archie Fowler =

English cricketer

Archibald John Burgess Fowler (1 April 1891 – 7 May 1977) was an English first-class cricketer.

Archie Fowler represented Middlesex County Cricket Club in 26 first-class matches between 1921 and 1930 and received his County Cap. He never quite established himself, but did well in 1924, when he took 5/29 versus a strong Lancashire team. He scored 133 runs at an average of 7.00, with a highest score of 21. He took 14 catches and 41 wickets at an average of 26.75, with a personal best of 5/29.

He succeeded George Fenner as the MCC Coach during the mid-1930s and is remembered as an outstanding coach. He constantly umpired at Lord's and finally acted as 1st XI Scorer, following the retirement of Patsy Hendren in 1960, before being succeeded by Jim Alldis. His connection with Lord's lasted for over fifty years.
