= Cec Pepper =

Australian cricketer (1916–1993)

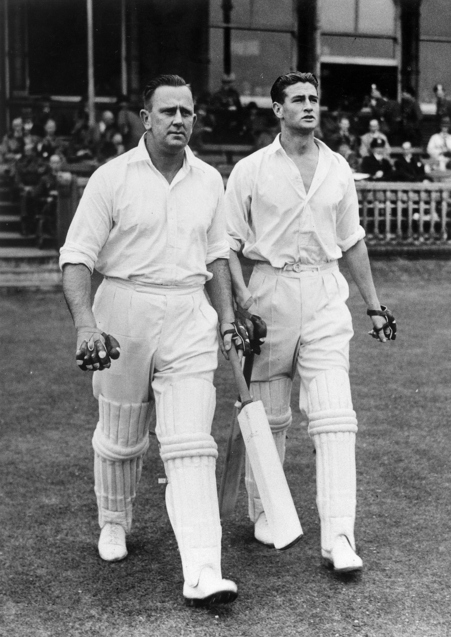
- Pepper (left) walks out to bat with Keith Miller

Personal information
- Full name: Cecil George Pepper
- Born: 15 September 1916; Forbes, New South Wales, Australia
- Died: 22 March 1993 (aged 76); Littleborough, Greater Manchester, England
- Batting: Right-handed
- Bowling: Right-arm leg break and googly
- Role: All-rounder, Umpire

Domestic team information
- Years: Team
- 1938–1941: New South Wales
- First-class debut: 25 November 1938; New South Wales v Queensland
- Last First-class: 4 September 1957; Commonwealth XI v England XI

Career statistics
Competition	First-class
Matches	44
Runs scored	1,927
Batting average	29.64
100s/50s	1/12
Top score	168
Balls bowled	9,698
Wickets	171
Bowling average	29.35
5 wickets in innings	7
10 wickets in match	0
Best bowling	6/33
Catches/stumpings	41/–
- Source: CricketArchive, 22 January 2009

Cecil George Pepper (15 September 1916 – 22 March 1993) was an Australian first-class cricketer who became a professional in English league cricket and later a first-class umpire in England. An allrounder, he was the first to complete the double twice in the Central Lancashire League. He once scored 38 runs off an eight-ball over.

== Cricket career ==
Cec Pepper played first-class cricket for New South Wales from 1938–39 to 1940–41. He fought in World War II in the Middle East and New Guinea, and at the end of the war he played for Australian Services cricket teams in England (the "Victory Tests" series) in 1945 and in India, Ceylon and Australia in 1945–46.

Career highlights included an innings he played for New South Wales at Brisbane in 1940–41 when he made 81 with all but 7 of them coming in boundaries. His only century came when he hit 168 in 146 minutes, with 17 fours and 6 sixes, for the Australian Services XI against H.D.G. Leveson-Gower's XI at Scarborough in 1945. His best bowling figures of 6 for 33 came in 1949–50 when touring India with a Commonwealth side. He took a hat-trick in the match. He played only two first-class matches after that tour, spending the rest of his career as a professional in league cricket.

Pepper became embroiled in a row that is widely believed to have cost him Test selection. Teammates Keith Miller and Dick Whitington regarded him as one of the best all rounders in the world and a certainty for Australian Test selection. Pepper appealed for leg before wicket against Australian captain Don Bradman in a match against South Australia. The appeal was turned down and Pepper complained to the umpire, prompting Bradman, who was also a member of the Australian Board, to lodge a complaint about Pepper. Pepper was subsequently never selected for Australia. Cricket historian Gideon Haigh said that "[team manager Keith] Johnson was clearly upset by the affair, and also by the failure of the [national] selection panel [Bradman among them] ... to send Pepper, second only to Miller as a cricketer in the Services XI, to New Zealand" in 1945–46. Johnson tried to intercede on Pepper's behalf to no avail, although the other board members claimed that no directive had been given to the selectors to exclude Pepper.

Garry Sobers, who played against him in league cricket, said of Pepper that "the reason why he never played county cricket was probably because of his overripe language. He was certainly good enough as a cricketer but no one wanted to take the chance ... It is said that Sir Don Bradman once remarked that had Cec's mouth and his attitude been different, he would have been one of the greatest all-rounders the world has ever seen."

After retiring he became an umpire in county cricket from 1964 until 1980. He remained in England and died in 1993 in Lancashire. His Wisden obituary noted that "A Manchester Evening News correspondent said he could not imagine any match involving Pepper pursuing a peaceful course", but added that usually "there was more humour than anger".

== Personal life ==
During his early years as a professional cricketer in the Lancashire leagues, Pepper was the highest-paid cricketer in England. He established a successful packaging business in Bury in Lancashire, and bought residences in Blackpool and the south of Spain.

Pepper married Maurine Ford in Wagga Wagga in October 1943. They had a son in England in November 1946. Pepper had an affair in England in 1944 that led to the birth of a son in 1945. Maurine divorced him in 1948 on the grounds of adultery and returned to Australia, where she remarried in 1952. Pepper did not remarry, but he and a married woman had a son in October 1964.

Pepper died of heart disease in Littleborough, Lancashire, in March 1993. He left his estate, worth £135,000, divided equally between his third son and a woman he had known for only a few months.

== See also ==
- List of New South Wales representative cricketers

== Sources ==
- Haigh, Gideon; Frith, David (2007) Inside story: unlocking Australian cricket's archives, Southbank, Victoria: News Custom Publishing. ISBN 1-921116-00-5.
