= Jack Pettiford =

Australian cricketer (1919–1964)

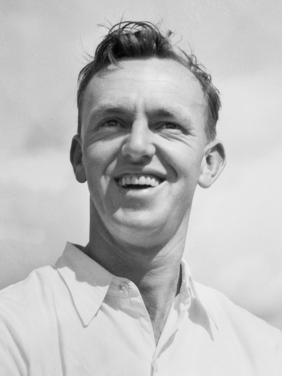
- Pettiford in 1945

Personal information
- Full name: John Pettiford
- Born: 29 November 1919; Freshwater, New South Wales, Australia
- Died: 11 October 1964 (aged 44); North Sydney, New South Wales, Australia
- Batting: Right-handed
- Bowling: Leg break

Domestic team information
- Years: Team
- 1946/47–1947/48: New South Wales
- 1954–1959: Kent
- FC debut: 6 August 1945 Australian Services v England
- Last FC: 2 September 1959 Kent v Nottinghamshire

Career statistics
Competition	First-class
Matches	201
Runs scored	7,077
Batting average	25.64
100s/50s	4/30
Top score	133
Balls bowled	18,310
Wickets	295
Bowling average	31.38
5 wickets in innings	7
10 wickets in match	1
Best bowling	6/134
Catches/stumpings	99/–
- Source: CricketArchive, 19 March 2011

John Pettiford (29 November 1919 – 11 October 1964) was an Australian cricketer. He was educated at North Sydney Boys High School He played more than 200 first-class matches, mostly for New South Wales and Kent County Cricket Club. In the 1949 and 1950 seasons, he was the professional for Nelson Cricket Club in the Lancashire League. He was professional for Darwen Cricket Club in the Northern Cricket League in seasons 1960 and 1961.

He served in the Royal Australian Air Force in World War II. He was a member of the Australian Services cricket team at the end of the war.
