= Albert Cheetham =

Australian cricketer

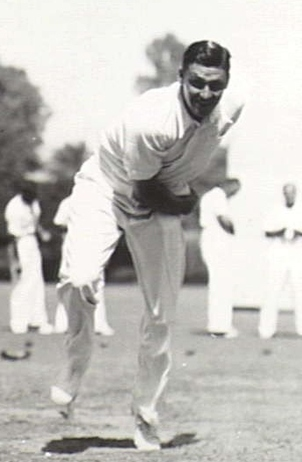
- Cheetham in Egypt in 1941

Personal information
- Full name: Albert George Cheetham
- Born: 7 December 1915; Sydney, Australia
- Died: 23 May 1997 (aged 81); Melbourne, Australia
- Batting: Right-handed
- Bowling: Right-arm fast-medium

Domestic team information
- Years: Team
- 1936/37–1945/46: New South Wales

Career statistics
Competition	First-class
Matches	24
Runs scored	899
Batting average	20.90
100s/50s	0/5
Top score	85
Balls bowled	1,517
Wickets	42
Bowling average	36.11
5 wickets in innings	0
10 wickets in match	0
Best bowling	4/75
Catches/stumpings	7/–
- Source: ESPNcricinfo, 24 December 2016

Albert George Cheetham (7 December 1915 – 23 May 1997) was an Australian cricketer. He played 24 first-class matches for New South Wales and the Australian Services XI between 1936 and 1946.

Cheetham was an all-rounder, a middle-order batsman and opening bowler. He made his highest first-class score and took his best bowling figures in the same match: 85 and 4 for 75, when New South Wales defeated Queensland in the opening match of the 1939–40 Sheffield Shield.

In World War Two, Cheetham served in the Australian Army's anti-tank forces from 1940 to 1945, finishing with the rank of captain. He moved to Adelaide in late 1945 to work as the manager of an insurance company. He married Marion McLeish in Adelaide in July 1946.
