= Australian Services cricket team in England in 1945 =

International cricket tour

The Australian Services cricket team in England in 1945 played six first-class matches, winning three and losing two with one match drawn.

== Annual reviews ==
- Wisden Cricketers' Almanack 1946
