= Bob Cristofani =

Australian cricketer and diplomat (1920–2002)

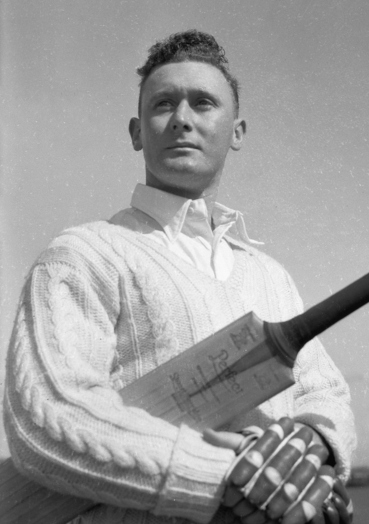
- Cristofani in 1945

Personal information
- Full name: Desmond Robert Cristofani
- Born: 14 November 1920; Waverley, Sydney, New South Wales, Australia
- Died: 21 August 2002 (aged 81); Fleet, Hampshire, England
- Batting: Right-handed
- Bowling: Leg-break, right-arm medium

Career statistics
Competition	FC
Matches	18
Runs scored	749
Batting average	26.75
100s/50s	1/4
Top score	110*
Balls bowled	2,951
Wickets	48
Bowling average	32.93
5 wickets in innings	2
10 wickets in match	0
Best bowling	5/49
Catches/stumpings	12/0
- Source: CricketArchive, 19 April 2009

Desmond Robert Cristofani (14 November 1920 – 21 August 2002) was an Australian cricketer and diplomat.

== Cricket career ==
Cristofani played 18 first-class cricket matches in the 1940s. 14 of those games were for the Australian Services, three for New South Wales and one for the Dominions.

His best performances were both for the Australian Services side in the 1945 Victory Tests against England. In July at Lord's, he took 4/43 and 5/49. With the bat, his solitary hundred came a month later at Old Trafford, when he scored an unbeaten 110 from number eight. He also took 5/55 in the first innings of this match, but England won by six wickets.

Cristofani's century was mentioned in E. W. Swanton's article "Cricket under the Japs" in the 1946 edition of Wisden Cricketers' Almanack. At the end of his piece, Swanton wrote of his experience shortly after the end of the war and his release from his prisoner of war camp:

I had, by then, already taken my first walk for three and a half years as a free man. We found ourselves in a Thai village on the edge of the jungle. In the little café our hosts politely turned on the English programme. Yes, we were at Old Trafford, and a gentleman called Cristofani was getting a hundred....

In 1950 Cristofani was employed as a professional by Accrington Cricket Club of the Lancashire League, and turned in some fine performances, for example his return of 6/23 from 8.7 eight-ball overs as Accrington crushed near neighbours Enfield.

== Diplomatic career ==
Cristofani had a law degree from Sydney University. He joined Australia's Department of Trade in the 1950s. After postings in Johannesburg, Salisbury, Accra and Colombo, he was appointed Australian Trade Commissioner in London in 1966.

== Death ==
There is a discrepancy in the major sources regarding Cristofani's date and place of death. CricketArchive, as used in the infobox in this article, shows his death as occurring in Fleet on 21 August 2002. This is backed up by UK government death records showing that a Desmond Robert Cristofani, with the correct date of birth, died in Northeast Hampshire (which contains Fleet) on that date. However, his obituary in the 2003 edition of Wisden Cricketers' Almanack gives his death as occurring one day later, and in Canberra, Australia. Cricinfo follows Wisden in this.
