= Keith Carmody =

Australian cricketer

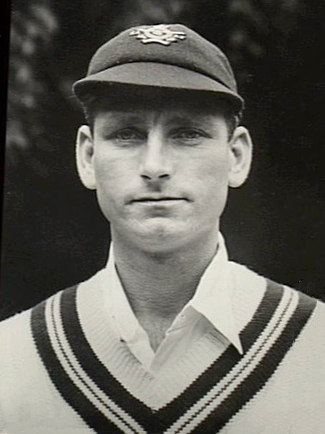
- Carmody in 1945

Personal information
- Full name: Douglas Keith Carmody
- Born: 16 February 1919; Mosman, New South Wales, Australia
- Died: 21 October 1977 (aged 58); Concord, New South Wales, Australia
- Batting: Right-handed
- Bowling: Right-arm medium
- Role: Middle-order batsman

Domestic team information
- Years: Team
- 1939/40–1946/47: New South Wales
- 1947/48–1955/56: Western Australia

Career statistics
Competition	First-class
Matches	65
Runs scored	3,496
Batting average	28.89
100s/50s	2/20
Top score	198
Balls bowled	371
Wickets	3
Bowling average	62.33
5 wickets in innings	0
10 wickets in match	0
Best bowling	1/0
Catches/stumpings	39/3
- Source: CricketArchive, 10 April 2008

Douglas Keith Carmody (16 February 1919 – 21 October 1977) was an Australian first-class cricketer who played during the 1940s and 1950s. He was Western Australia's captain when they won their first ever Sheffield Shield in 1948, and is credited as being the inventor of the 'umbrella field'.

Born in Mosman, Carmody started his career with New South Wales. He made his Sheffield Shield debut against Queensland in 1939/40, his only game before the competition was suspended because of the war. During World War II, Carmody joined the Royal Australian Air Force but continued playing cricket with the Australian Services team, touring England and India in 1945. Carmody was at one stage imprisoned at Stalag Luft III, having been shot down off the coast of Holland. He was eventually freed by the Russian army.

When the war ended he returned to Shield cricket for the 1946/47 season. The following summer he crossed to Western Australia who had just joined the competition and Carmody was appointed as their inaugural captain. Carmody made his highest first-class score of 198 against South Australia in Perth during the season. They went on to win the competition in their first attempt and Carmody remained in charge until Ken Meuleman took over in 1956–57.
