= Australian cricket selectors =

Select squads for national cricket teams

The Australian cricket selectors are a group of people appointed by Cricket Australia to be responsible for team selections for each of the Australian national sides in every form of cricket.

Current members for the Australian Men's Team are (as of November 2022): George Bailey (Chairman), Andrew McDonald (also Head Coach) and Tony Dodemaide. Current members for the Australian Women's Team are (as of November 2022): Shawn Flegler (Chairman), Shelley Nitschke (also Head Coach), Avril Fahey and Julie Hayes.

Australia's selection panel for the men's team was changed in November 2016 after a disappointing start to the summer which included back to back losses to South Africa at Perth and Hobart, the low point being the batting collapse for a total of 84 at Hobart. The preceding losses away to Sri Lanka in Tests (lost 0–3) and to the South Africans in One-dayers (lost 0–5) added further fuel to the fire forcing the ex-incumbent Rod Marsh to resign from his position of chairman of selection panel on the eve of 16 November 2016 taking moral responsibility for the debacle. Thereafter, on 17 November 2016, Trevor Hohns (already a member selector since May 2014), a former Australian leg spinner and a former national selector from 1993 to 2006, was appointed as the interim chairman of the selection panel. In addition, Greg Chappell, Cricket Australia's then National Talent Manager, was appointed as an interim selector to complete the selection panel also comprising Mark Waugh and Australia's Head Coach Darren Lehmann.

Until 2003, there would be a selection panel appointed by the former Australian Cricket Board which would pick players for home games and overseas tours. However, on the overseas tours selections would be done by a committee consisting of the captain, vice-captain and manager.

== Some previous selectors - Australian men's team ==
- John Benaud (1988–1990s)
- David Boon (2000–11)
- Allan Border (1998–2005)
- Don Bradman (1936–52) (1953–71) – gave up selecting over the 1952–53 season because his son contracted polio
- William Bruce
- Thomas Carroll
- Greg Chappell (1982–83) (1984–88) (2010–11)
- Herbie Collins
- Jamie Cox (2006–11)
- Joe Darling
- Alan Davidson
- Charlie Dolling – died in 1936 while still a selector
- Chappie Dwyer – sacked in 1952 over criticism of selection of Sid Barnes
- Charles Eady
- Syd Gregory
- Dick Guy
- Neil Harvey (1967–79)
- Clem Hill
- Jim Higgs
- Andrew Hilditch (1996–2011)
- Merv Hughes (2005–10)
- Sam Loxton (1972–81)
- Peter McAlister
- Rick McCosker (1984–85)
- Len Maddocks
- Phil Ridings (1952–53) (1971–84)
- Jack Ryder (1946–1970)
- Laurie Sawle (1982–97)
- Dudley Seddon (1954–67)
- Bob Simpson (1987–97)
- Trevor Hohns (1995–2005) (2016–21)

== List of Australian Men's Team selection panels ==
- 1928–29: Australia break convention and use four selectors
- 1929–30: Jack Ryder, R. L. Jones, C. E. Dolling – Jones and Dolling did not pick Ryder for the 1930 Ashes tour
- 1935–36: Chappie Dwyer, W Johnson, Vic Richardson
- 1936–37: Chappie Dwyer, W Johnson, Don Bradman
- 1937–38: Chappie Dwyer, W Johnson, Don Bradman
- 1946–47: Don Bradman, Jack Ryder, Chappie Dwyer
- 1947–48: Don Bradman, Jack Ryder, Chappie Dwyer
- 1948–49: Don Bradman, Jack Ryder, Chappie Dwyer
- 1950–51: Don Bradman, Jack Ryder, Chappie Dwyer
- 1951–52: Don Bradman, Jack Ryder, Chappie Dwyer
- 1952–53: Jack Ryder, Phil Ridings, Bill Brown
- 1954–55: Don Bradman, Jack Ryder, Dudley Seddon
- 1956–57: Don Bradman, Jack Ryder, Dudley Seddon
- 1957–58: Don Bradman, Jack Ryder, Dudley Seddon
- 1958–59: Don Bradman, Jack Ryder, Dudley Seddon
- 1960–61: Don Bradman, Jack Ryder, Dudley Seddon
- 1961–62: Don Bradman, Jack Ryder, Dudley Seddon
- 1962–63: Don Bradman, Jack Ryder, Dudley Seddon
- 1963–64: Don Bradman, Jack Ryder, Dudley Seddon
- 1964–65: Don Bradman, Jack Ryder, Dudley Seddon
- 1965–66: Don Bradman, Jack Ryder, Dudley Seddon
- 1966–67: Don Bradman, Jack Ryder, Dudley Seddon
- 1967–68: Don Bradman, Jack Ryder, Neil Harvey
- 1968–69: Don Bradman, Jack Ryder, Neil Harvey
- 1969–70: Don Bradman, Jack Ryder, Neil Harvey
- 1972–73: Phil Ridings, Sam Loxton, Neil Harvey
- 1973–74: Phil Ridings, Sam Loxton, Neil Harvey
- 1974–75: Phil Ridings, Sam Loxton, Neil Harvey
- 1975–76: Phil Ridings, Sam Loxton, Neil Harvey
- 1976–77: Phil Ridings (c), Sam Loxton, Neil Harvey – first time a chairman had been appointed
- 1977–78: Phil Ridings (c), Sam Loxton, Neil Harvey
- 1978–79: Phil Ridings (c), Sam Loxton, Neil Harvey
- 1979–80: Phil Ridings (c), Sam Loxton, Ray Lindwall, Alan Davidson
- 1980–81: Phil Ridings (c), Sam Loxton, Ray Lindwall, Alan Davidson
- 1981–82: Phil Ridings (c), Len Maddocks, Ray Lindwall, Alan Davidson
- 1982–83: Phil Ridings (c), Laurie Sawle, Ray Lindwall, Alan Davidson, Greg Chappell
- 1983–84: Phil Ridings (c), Laurie Sawle, Alan Davidson
- 1984–85: Laurie Sawle, Greg Chappell, Rick McCosker
- 1985–86: Laurie Sawle, Greg Chappell, Jim Higgs, Dick Guy
- 1986–87: Laurie Sawle, Greg Chappell, Jim Higgs, Dick Guy
- 1987–88: Laurie Sawle (c), Bob Simpson, Greg Chappell, Jim Higgs
- 1988–89: Laurie Sawle (c), Bob Simpson, Jim Higgs, John Benaud
- 1990–91: Laurie Sawle (c), Bob Simpson, Jim Higgs
- 1992–93: Laurie Sawle (c), Bob Simpson, Jim Higgs, John Benaud
- 1993–94: Laurie Sawle (c), Bob Simpson, Jim Higgs, Steve Bernard
- 1994–95: Laurie Sawle (c), Peter Taylor, Jim Higgs, Steve Bernard, Trevor Hohns
- 1995–96: Laurie Sawle (c), Peter Taylor, Jim Higgs, Steve Bernard, Trevor Hohns
- 1996–97: Trevor Hohns (c), Peter Taylor, Jim Higgs, Steve Bernard, Andrew Hilditch
- 1997–98: Trevor Hohns (c), Andrew Hilditch, Steve Bernard (panel reduced to three)
- 1998–99: Trevor Hohns (c), Andrew Hilditch, Allan Border
- 1999–2000: Trevor Hohns (c), Andrew Hilditch, Allan Border
- 2000–01: Trevor Hohns (c), Andrew Hilditch, David Boon, Allan Border
- 2001–02: Trevor Hohns (c), Andrew Hilditch, David Boon, Allan Border
- 2002–03: Trevor Hohns (c), Andrew Hilditch, David Boon, Allan Border
- 2003–04: Trevor Hohns (c), Andrew Hilditch, David Boon, Allan Border
- 2004–05: Trevor Hohns (c), Andrew Hilditch, David Boon, Allan Border
- 2005–06: Trevor Hohns (c), Andrew Hilditch, David Boon, Merv Hughes
- 2006–07: Andrew Hilditch (c), David Boon, Jamie Cox, Merv Hughes
- 2007–08: Andrew Hilditch (c), David Boon, Jamie Cox, Merv Hughes
- 2008–09: Andrew Hilditch (c), David Boon, Jamie Cox, Merv Hughes
- 2009–10: Andrew Hilditch (c), David Boon, Jamie Cox, Merv Hughes
- 2010–11: Andrew Hilditch (c), David Boon, Jamie Cox, Greg Chappell
- 2011–12: John Inverarity (c), Mickey Arthur, Michael Clarke, Rod Marsh, Andy Bichel
- 2012–13: John Inverarity (c), Darren Lehmann, Rod Marsh, Andy Bichel
- 2013–14: John Inverarity (c), Darren Lehmann, Rod Marsh, Andy Bichel
- 2014–15: Rod Marsh (c), Darren Lehmann, Mark Waugh, Trevor Hohns
- 2015–16: Rod Marsh (c), Darren Lehmann, Mark Waugh, Trevor Hohns
- 2016–17: Trevor Hohns (c), Darren Lehmann, Mark Waugh, Greg Chappell
- 2017–18: Trevor Hohns (c), Darren Lehmann, Mark Waugh (T20I only), Greg Chappell
- 2018–19: Trevor Hohns (c), Justin Langer, Greg Chappell
- 2019–20: Trevor Hohns (c), Justin Langer, Greg Chappell
- 2020–21: Trevor Hohns (c), Justin Langer, George Bailey
- 2021–22: George Bailey (c), Justin Langer, Tony Dodemaide
- 2022–present: George Bailey (c), Andrew McDonald, Tony Dodemaide

== List of Australian Women's Team selection panels ==
- 2012–14: Cathryn Fitzpatrick (c), Julie Hayes, Avril Fahey
- 2014–15: Shawn Flegler (c), Cathryn Fitzpatrick, Julie Hayes, Avril Fahey
- 2015–22: Shawn Flegler (c), Matthew Mott, Julie Hayes, Avril Fahey
- 2022–present: Shawn Flegler (c), Shelley Nitschke, Julie Hayes, Avril Fahey
