= Don Tallon =

Australian cricketer (1916–1984)

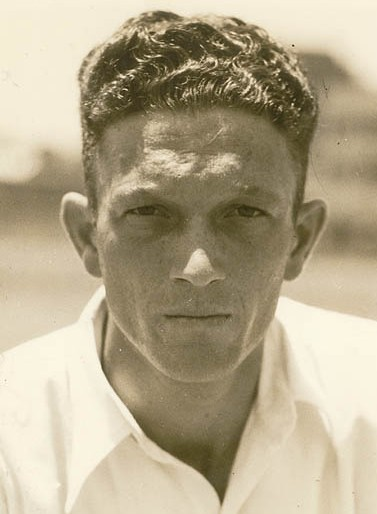

Personal information
- Full name: Donald Tallon
- Born: 17 February 1916; Bundaberg, Queensland, Australia
- Died: 7 September 1984 (aged 68); Bundaberg, Australia
- Nickname: "Deafy"
- Height: 1.8 m (5 ft 11 in)
- Batting: Right-handed
- Bowling: Right-arm leg spin
- Role: Wicket-keeper

International information
- National side: Australia
- Test debut (cap 169): 29 March 1946 v New Zealand
- Last Test: 16 June 1953 v England

Domestic team information
- Years: Team
- 1933/34–1953/54: Queensland

Career statistics
Competition	Test	First-class
Matches	21	150
Runs scored	394	6,034
Batting average	17.13	29.14
100s/50s	0/2	9/27
Top score	92	193
Balls bowled	–	301
Wickets	–	0
Bowling average	–	–
5 wickets in innings	–	–
10 wickets in match	–	–
Best bowling	–	–
Catches/stumpings	50/8	301/132
- Source: CricketArchive, 12 December 2007

Donald Tallon (17 February 1916 – 7 September 1984) was an Australian cricketer who played 21 Test matches as a wicket-keeper between 1946 and 1953. He was widely regarded by his contemporaries as Australia's finest ever wicket-keeper and one of the best in Test history, with an understated style, an ability to anticipate the flight, length and spin of the ball and an efficient stumping technique. Tallon toured England as part of Don Bradman's Invincibles of 1948 and was recognised as one of the Wisden Cricketers of the Year in 1949 for his performances during that season. During his Test career, Tallon made 58 dismissals comprising 50 catches and 8 stumpings.

His early cricket was played in Bundaberg where he was selected to represent Queensland Country against the England cricket team during the infamous Bodyline tour. Aged 17, he made his first-class cricket debut for Queensland against Victoria in December 1933. By the 1935–36 season, Tallon was an established player and he topped the Queensland batting averages for the season, however he was a surprise non-inclusion for the 1938 Australian team to tour England. Following the Second World War and the retirement or unavailability of other candidates, he was finally given an opportunity to play Test cricket, making his debut against New Zealand in 1946 aged 30.

Following the Invincibles tour, poor health dogged Tallon, causing him to miss the 1949–50 tour of South Africa. He recovered his spot for the Ashes series in 1950–51, catching well but failing with the bat. Tallon missed selection for the 1951–52 Test season but recovered his spot for the 1953 Australian team to tour England. He played in the first Test before being replaced by Gil Langley, this time permanently. He retired from first-class cricket in 1953 and returned to Bundaberg, assisting his brother in running a corner store. He died in Bundaberg aged 68.

== Early years ==
Tallon was born on 17 February 1916 in the Queensland coastal sugar and rum town of Bundaberg, 400 kilometres (249 mi) north of Brisbane. He learned to play cricket on a backyard wicket with his three brothers and father Les, an iron moulder at the Bundaberg foundry, who played as a slow bowler in the local cricket competition. Often the matches would stretch past the daylight hours, and the brothers would play inside the house after moving the furniture to create some open space. Tallon was formally trained as a wicket-keeper at North Bundaberg State School where he and his brothers were coached by Tom O'Shea, a teacher and former Sheffield Shield wicket-keeper. He became the primary school's wicket-keeper at the age of seven, playing with and against boys aged 11 and 12. He learned to keep to the leg spin of his brother Bill, who also went on to represent Queensland. Tallon later said of his decision to become a wicket-keeper, "You are never out of the game, and that suits me fine". He was captain of his school team at the age of 11 and rose to become captain of Queensland Schoolboys aged 13. He played in Bundaberg's A grade adult team at 14, and came to the attention of state selectors when Bundaberg played a team captained by Test player Alan Kippax in 1931.

The following season, he played in the Country trials in Brisbane. He was selected for the Queensland Colts in 1932–33 and represented Queensland Country against Douglas Jardine's England cricket team during the Bodyline tour. In England's innings of 376, Tallon conceded only five byes and stumped Herbert Sutcliffe, regarded as one of the finest batsmen in Test history. He did not get a chance to display his batting prowess as the Bodyline spearhead Harold Larwood rattled him with a series of deliveries aimed at the throat, before bowling him for two. Tallon's fast and efficient skills behind the stumps further caught the eye of cricket officials in early 1933 at the Country Week Carnivals. Tallon distinguished himself with his tidy keeping to the express pace bowling of Eddie Gilbert, whose suspect action and indigenous heritage were later the subject of controversy.

== First-class debut ==
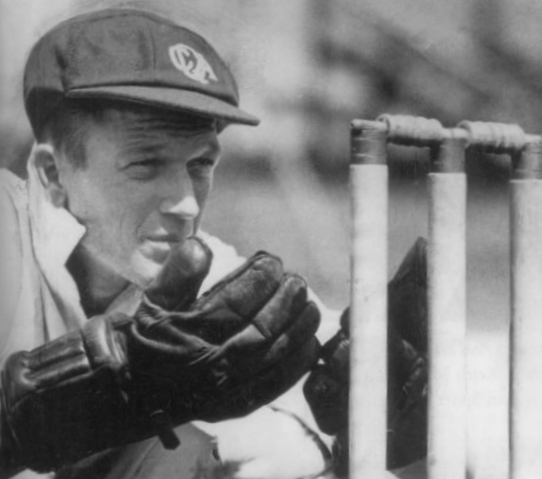
Tallon wearing the maroon cap of Queensland

He made his first-class debut for Queensland at 17 against Victoria in December 1933, having never previously attended a first-class match as a spectator. He conceded only six byes and took a catch in an innings of 542 in a tidy performance, and made 17 and three in an innings defeat, but was dropped after the match. Queensland officials had ruled that it was not advisable to take such a young player on away trips to Victoria, South Australia and New South Wales. Tallon reclaimed his position when Queensland returned for their home games and from then on was the first-choice wicket-keeper for the state. He played in only one other first-class match for the 1933–34 season, scoring 13 and taking a catch and a stumping in an eight-wicket win over South Australia.

In his second first-class match in the 1934–35 season, and his fourth overall, he confirmed his batting ability with 58 and 86 against the South Australian bowling attack led by Clarrie Grimmett, the world's leading leg spinner at the time, but was unable to prevent an eight-wicket defeat. Tallon played in five matches for the season, and Queensland lost four and won none. He took four catches, made two stumpings and scored 216 runs at 24.00 in innings, although he did score four ducks.

Towards the end of 1934, Tallon moved to Brisbane, where he worked as a storeman for a car company. In 1935–36, Tallon was Queensland's top batsman in terms of both runs and batting average, scoring 569 runs at an average of 51.72. He started well with 58 in a drawn match against New South Wales, and then scored 45 and made six dismissals in an innings as Queensland fell to an innings defeat against the Marylebone Cricket Club (MCC), including five stumpings. He then made four dismissals in an innings in the next match against Victoria.

Tallon was prominent in the next match against South Australia in Adelaide. The hosts included Australia captain Don Bradman in their ranks, making a comeback from illness. The match was mainly noted for Bradman's 233 but Tallon impressed him by taking two particularly difficult catches, one of which dismissed the Australian captain himself. Bradman also praised Tallon for conceding only seven byes in a total of 642, particularly his ability to take balls passing down the leg side. Tallon then scored 88 in Queensland's reply. Bradman opined that he had a "clean-hitting crisp style ... attacking, positive, and with a technique to rival most first-class batsmen". Despite this, Queensland fell to defeat by an innings and 226 runs. He followed this with 51 in a defeat to New South Wales. The highlight of Tallon's season was his highest first-class score of 193, against Victoria in Brisbane, in the last fixture of the season, a match in which he also took five catches in an innings. Tallon's innings played a large part in the hosts' saving of the match after conceding a lead of 252 on the first innings. As he continued his consistent form with both bat and gloves, he came into strong consideration for Test selection. While Tallon was performing strongly in Australia, the national team were in South Africa and defeated their hosts 4–0. Nevertheless, it was another unsuccessful season for Queensland; Tallon did not experience a win and suffered losses in three of his six matches.

== Pre-war non-selection ==
During the 1930s, Queensland was a weak cricketing state, having only been admitted to the Sheffield Shield in 1926–27, and the national selectors tended to choose Australia teams composed entirely of New South Welshmen, Victorians and South Australians. New South Wales' Bert Oldfield was the incumbent wicket-keeper and had no plans to retire, while Victoria's Ben Barnett had been the reserve keeper on the 1934 tour of England. South Australia's Charlie Walker was also talked of as a possible Test player.

Tallon was scrutinised as a Test candidate when England toured for the 1936–37 Ashes series. He was selected in Bradman's XI for a one-off match against Victor Richardson's XI at the start of the season. It was a testimonial for Richardson and such matches were used as Test trials for the top players in Australia. Tallon took three catches but was unable to capitalise with the bat. He made three and was unbeaten without scoring in the second innings as Bradman's men reached their target. In the next match against New South Wales, Tallon took four catches and scored 100 to bring his team back into contention after conceding a 190-run lead. However, New South Wales scraped home to win by one wicket. It continued a winless streak for Tallon in Queensland colours that had lasted for over two and a half years. Tallon had a final chance to push for selection in two matches for an Australian XI and Queensland respectively, against Gubby Allen's Englishmen before the Tests. He made a total of seven dismissals but scored only 49 runs in three innings.

When the Test team was announced, Tallon was overlooked as the selectors persisted with Oldfield. Tallon remained consistent for Queensland, making 22 dismissals in total for the season. With the bat, he once again topped his state's averages, scoring 434 runs at 36.16. He scored 101 against South Australia and 96 against Victoria, but both matches were lost. Queensland defeat New South Wales to record their first win in three years, but the remaining five Sheffield Shield matches were all lost.

The 1937–38 season was purely domestic, with no international matches, but it was an opportunity for all players to push for selection in the squad for the 1938 Ashes tour. It was another disappointing season for Queensland, who were again winless; they lost three matches, hung on for a draw, eight wickets down in another, and the other two fixtures were washed out before the second innings. Tallon scored 204 runs at 22.66 without managing a half-century and made 17 dismissals.

Tallon's non-selection for the 1938 Ashes touring party surprised commentators. In selection deliberations, Bradman had lobbied for Tallon and Walker, asserting that Oldfield was past his best. The other two selectors, Chappie Dwyer from New South Wales and Bill Johnson from Victoria, outvoted Bradman. They selected Barnett, because of his previous tour to England, and Walker. Tallon's omission was overshadowed by that of Grimmett, regarded alongside Bill O'Reilly as the world's leading legspinner. No official reason was given for Tallon's non-selection. A leak revealed that the reason for his omission was that he was not familiar with the bowling of Australia's three spinners: O'Reilly, Chuck Fleetwood-Smith and Frank Ward. Another was Tallon's preference in standing back to medium pacers. In reality, Tallon stood back and stood up to the stumps depending on the situation. While the medium pacers were swinging the ball, he would stand back to avoid the risk of missing an edge. When the ball was old, he would stand up to the stumps when a medium pacer was operating and effect many stumpings with his fast reflexes.

During the series, Barnett made two notable errors. With Australia leading the series 1–0 going into the Fifth Test at The Oval, Barnett dropped Len Hutton and Maurice Leyland when both were on 40. Leyland went on to post 187 while Hutton set a Test world record of 364. In effect, England were gifted an extra 461 runs as they set a world record score of 7/903. Bradman injured himself during the marathon innings in a rare stint at the bowling crease after the specialist bowlers had failed to break the Englishmen. With opener Jack Fingleton also injured, Australia were down to nine men and fell to the heaviest defeat in Test history (an innings and 579 runs) and the series was drawn.

Tallon responded during the 1938–39 season by equalling two world records. The season started poorly for Queensland, not winning any of their first three matches. Tallon made eight dismissals in the opening match of the Sheffield Shield campaign against New South Wales, but the visitors hung on for a draw with one wicket in hand. After two consecutive losses, Tallon set the first of his world records. Against New South Wales in Sydney, he dismissed 12 batsmen, six in each innings, a feat performed only once before, in 1868 by Surrey's Ted Pooley. Tallon's dozen included three stumpings and he was at the crease when Queensland hit the winning runs to complete their first victory in two years. After nine innings during the season without passing 36, Tallon returned to form with the bat, scoring 115 against South Australia, but was unable to take the field in the second innings due to injury as the match ended in a ten-wicket defeat. In the final match of the season, Tallon became the fourth keeper to make seven dismissals in an innings, in a match against Victoria. He did not concede a bye in the innings of 348, and scored 44 as Queensland completed an innings win. Tallon finished the season with 34 dismissals in six matches, setting a new Australian season record. He took more than five dismissals in an innings in four of the ten innings in which he kept wicket. Observers noted Tallon to be more motivated than ever; his catching and stumping style became more animated, and his appealing reached new levels of sound. He passed 100 first-class dismissals during the season, achieved in just 32 matches—the fastest Australian to reach the mark. Tallon ended the season with 305 runs at 30.50.

== World War II ==
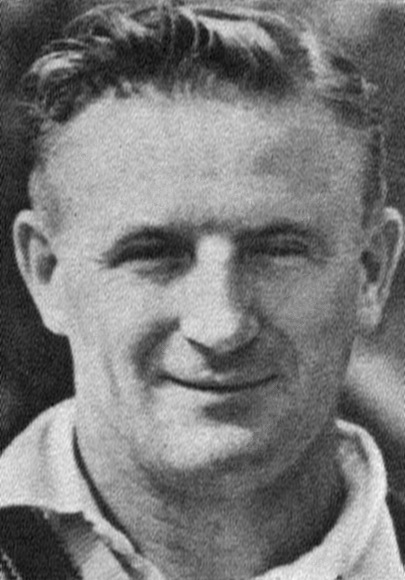
Colin McCool, with whom Tallon had a noted cricketing partnership

Following his form in 1938–39, Tallon eagerly awaited the arrival of England for the 1940–41 tour of Australia. He was only 23 and regarded as an almost certain selection following his record-breaking performance with both bat and gloves. However, the outbreak of the Second World War called a halt to his rise and robbed him of the opportunity to represent his country while in his prime as a cricketer; official international cricket did not resume until he was 29. In the meantime, domestic cricket continued in 1939–40. It was another poor season for Queensland, who won only once and lost their remaining five matches. Tallon scored two fifties before scoring 154 in his last Sheffield Shield innings of the season. This set Victoria a target of 230, but they reached it for the loss of only one wicket. Tallon was selected for The Rest of Australia in a one-off match against New South Wales at the end of the season, but managed only a duck and eight. He ended the summer with 401 runs at 28.62 and 17 dismissals.

With the war intensifying, the 1940–41 season was truncated and the last before the hostilities ended. Tallon scored 55 and completed four dismissals as Queensland started with a 27-run loss to New South Wales. He then starred in a match for combined Queensland and Victoria team against New South Wales. Tallon scored 55 and 152 and completed four dismissals, but was unable to prevent a one-wicket loss. He ended with 379 runs at 42.11 and made 16 dismissals in five matches.

With first-class cricket cancelled, Tallon joined the Australian Army in August 1940 at Bundaberg. Tallon was discharged in 1943 as a private and was not decorated. His discharge was due to stomach ulcers and he later had a major operation to remove part of his stomach.

Upon the resumption of competitive cricket, Tallon's chances of selection had improved due to the fates of his pre-war wicket-keeping rivals. Oldfield had long retired. Barnett, a captain in the army, had been a prisoner of the Japanese at Changi in Singapore for four years. Emaciated, he slowly recovered his fitness and forced his way back into the Victorian team, but was almost 40 and intended to retire in the near future. Walker had joined the Royal Australian Air Force as a gunner and was killed in a duel with Nazi fighter pilots over Soltau in Germany. This left Tallon as the front-runner, but there was a possibility that the selectors would opt for generational change, with an eye to the future, and install a more youthful keeper like Gil Langley or Ron Saggers.

With the pressure of selection on his head, Tallon made eight dismissals in the first match after the resumption of cricket, against New South Wales in Brisbane, including three stumpings and three catches from the leg spin of Colin McCool, a future Test teammate. The performance was to herald the start of a prolific bowler-wicket-keeper partnership. Tallon then scored 74 to guide Queensland to the target of 270 with four wickets in hand. Queensland won two of their seven matches and Tallon scored 305 runs at 30.50 and completed 27 dismissals to finally gain national selection.

== Test debut ==
Tallon made his Test debut in a one-off Test against New Zealand at Wellington in March 1946, although the match was only given Test accreditation two years later. On a wet wicket, New Zealand were dismissed for 42 and 54 against the slow bowling of Bill O'Reilly and Ernie Toshack. Tallon made a stumping, a run out and took a catch. He scored only five runs as Australia won by an innings and 103 runs. Tallon had rarely kept to O'Reilly's leg spin and impressed the bowler, who compared him with Oldfield. During the tour of New Zealand, Australia won all of their five matches, four by an innings. Tallon scored 123 runs at 41.00 and made 12 dismissals.

The following season saw Australia's first Test series since the end of World War II, with five matches scheduled against Wally Hammond's touring Englishmen in the 1946–47 Ashes series. Tallon staked his claim for the Test wicket-keeping position in Queensland's second match of the season, which was against MCC. Tallon combined with McCool in four stumpings and two catches, and in the process took his first-class tally to 170 dismissals his 50th first-class match. He also scored 26 and 35. Tallon's proficiency keeping wicket to McCool's bowling was now a major factor in his favour for national selection, because McCool had established himself as Australia's first-choice spinner since the retirement of O'Reilly. Tallon was duly selected for the First Test of the series in Brisbane.

In First Test at Brisbane Tallon took two catches but scored only 14 in a victory. Tallon was worried that his poor batting might lead to him being replaced, but he was retained as Australia secured an innings victory in Sydney. He put in a polished performance with the gloves, with four catches and two stumpings, in addition to 30 runs. The only negative aspect of the match for Tallon was that he dislocated his finger. Beyond the raw statistics, two of the catches that Tallon made in the first innings were regarded as among his finest ever and turned the tide of the match. Len Hutton and Bill Edrich—two of England's leading batsmen—had seen their team to lunch with only the loss of one wicket. Tallon declared to Bradman that he intended to dismiss Hutton down the leg side, so Bradman brought off spinner Ian Johnson into the attack immediately after lunch. Johnson was instructed to bowl at Hutton's legs to give him an opportunity to glance the ball. Hutton obliged and struck the ball from the middle of his bat, expecting a boundary. He turned around and was shocked to see that Tallon had intercepted the ball from a blind position at a range of just one metre. The score was 2/88 as Hutton, who held the Test world record score was dismissed and replaced at the batting crease by Denis Compton. Bradman introduced McCool and Compton misjudged a cut shot which went wide of Tallon and struck Johnson, fielding at slip, in the chest. The ball rebounded past Tallon's shoulder and was heading for the ground when he spun and dived backwards to catch it just before it landed. According to Roland Perry, it was "an acrobatic feat that would put any trapeze artist in the shade, taking one of the most brilliant catches in Test history". Tallon took another difficult catch from McCool to dismiss Hammond as England fell to 4/99, with three specialist batsmen to improbable catches. This restricted England and allowed Australia to set up a match-winning lead.

Tallon now felt secure about his place in the team for the rest of the series. This led to increased confidence in his play in the Third Test at Melbourne (MCG). After keeping tidily and scoring 35 in the first innings, Tallon combined with Ray Lindwall in the second innings for a 154-run partnership in just 92 minutes. Described by Wisden as a "hurricane", the partnership was marked by Tallon's powerful driving and cutting. Lindwall reached his century, but Tallon fell for 92 to Doug Wright. Tallon's 92 remained the highest score by an Australian wicketkeeper until Rod Marsh equalled it with 92 not out in the 1970–71 Ashes series and surpassed it with 132 against New Zealand in 1973–74.

In the Fourth Test at Adelaide Tallon stumped Denis Compton, but the umpire gave him not out because "the glare of the sun suddenly became so intense that he was unable to see clearly the white line of the popping crease" and Compton made 147. The England openers Len Hutton and Cyril Washbrook had put on 100 in the second innings when Tallon caught Washbrook, scooping up a ball from Lindwall. Washbrook "stood there transfixed. Even some of the Australian leg-side fielders expressed amazement". Tallon was known for his impetuous appealing - "he was often roaring before he had studied facts and it was his over-eagerness that brought about the shocking decision". But Tallon maintained the appeal and Bradman backed him. Washbrook told Wally Hammond that the ball had gone into the ground just before it went into Tallon's gloves and the England captain tried unsuccessfully to find a press photograph of the ball touching the ground. Later in the match Tallon missed a vital stumping off the England wicketkeeper Godfrey Evans, who stayed put for 95 minutes without making a run. Tallon stumped Compton again, but he was given not out and went on to make an unbeaten 103 in a match-saving stand of 85 with Evans.

Tallon's keeping was further lauded in the second innings of the Fifth Test, when he stumped Edrich, Jack Ikin and Alec Bedser from McCool's bowling. By series end, Tallon had set an Australian Test record of 20 dismissals in a series and averaged 29 with the bat. He also scored 54 and claimed seven dismissals in a Queensland win over South Australia.

Tallon started the next season by taking five catches and scoring 41 in the second innings and Queensland scraped home to beat New South Wales by two wickets. He played in all five Tests against India in the Australian summer of 1947–48, and earned praise from Indian skipper Lala Amarnath who described him as the "greatest keeper he had seen". Tallon made 13 dismissals but had an unproductive time with the bat, scoring only 49 runs at 12.25. Outside the Tests, Tallon scored 229 runs at 22.90 and made 15 dismissals in six matches for Queensland.

== Invincibles tour ==
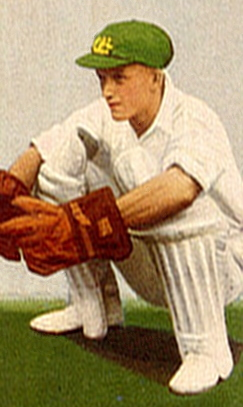
Tallon in the baggy green, taking his stance behind the stumps. Image shows his exaggerated crouch (See Style section).

Tallon's form saw him selected for the 1948 Ashes tour as part of the side that would become known to cricket history as the Invincibles. Tallon was the first-choice wicket-keeper, with Saggers as his deputy. Having spent the majority of his life in sunny Queensland and growing up in tropical Bundaberg, the cold English climate initially caught Tallon off guard. He did not wet his inner gloves as was his custom due to the temperature. As England agreed to make a new ball available every 55 overs, this meant that the ball would more frequently be in a favourable state for fast bowling, since it would swing more. As a result, Australia adopted a pace-oriented strategy and Johnson was the only spinner regularly used in the Test matches. McCool was not to play a Test on the tour, depriving Tallon of an opportunity to show his stumping abilities standing up at the stumps to his Queensland teammate.

Early in the tour, Tallon struck an unbeaten 17 on a damp pitch in a low-scoring match as Australia defeated Yorkshire by four wickets. It was the closest that the tourists came to defeat for the tour.

Tallon had difficulty with the English conditions early in the season as he sustained a bruised right finger when he lost sight of a Ray Lindwall bouncer on a misty morning during a tour match against Surrey at The Oval and was hit as he put hand over his face for protection, with the ball running away for four byes. As a result of the injury, Tallon was rested for the following three matches.

Despite sustaining an injury from a catching error, Tallon was selected for the First Test at Trent Bridge. He took four catches, including two difficult ones to dismiss key batsmen at the start of the second innings. He thus helped Australia to seize the initiative by denying England a good start, which was converted into an eight-wicket victory. The teams moved on to Lord's and Australia compiled 350 in its first innings. Tallon made 53 and helped the tail to "wag" and recover from a position of 7/258. Tallon did not concede a bye in England's first innings of 215 and his diving was estimated to have saved around 40 runs. One of the three catches he took stood out; it came when Washbrook inside edged a Toshack full toss directly downwards at Tallon's ankle. Bradman described the catch as "miraculous" because Tallon had to reach so low, so quickly, in order to take the catch. Another dive to stop a leg glance resulted in a severely bruised left little finger. However, Tallon also conceded 16 byes in England's total of 186. Australia won the Test, and Tallon was rested ahead of the next Test to allow his finger to recover.

The teams played out a draw in the third match at Manchester, where Tallon dismissed George Emmett from the bowling of Ray Lindwall with a diving one-handed catch. He also dropped Compton three times, allowing the English batsman to go from 50 to 145 not out as he held the hosts' first innings together.

Tallon's little left finger swelled up after the Third Test and he exacerbated the injury during a tour match against Middlesex, ruling him out of the Fourth Test at Headingley, which Australia won to secure the series. He returned for the Fifth Test at The Oval, taking three catches, including an acrobatic catch of Len Hutton down the leg side that was considered the catch of the season. He scored 31 as Australia sealed the series 4–0 with an innings win. When the last match of the tour against Scotland in Aberdeen became safe, with Australia in an unassailable position, Bradman allowed Tallon to dispense with his wicket-keeping pads and try his luck at bowling leg spin. Tallon never bowled in his Test career and only rarely in first-class cricket, where he delivered 301 balls, the approximate workload of a specialist bowler in one match.

Tallon had had moderate success with his batting during the Test series, aggregating 114 runs at 28.50. In 14 first-class matches, he scored 283 runs at 25.72. The Australian team strategy of primarily depending on pace bowling saw Tallon make 12 catches and no stumpings during the Tests; however, Bradman rested his lead pace bowlers Miller and Lindwall during the tour games to save energy for the Tests and allowed the spinners do more work, so that overall Tallon took 29 catches and 14 stumpings for the tour. Bradman deemed Tallon more agile than Saggers and better at taking acrobatic catches. Tallon's performances during the English summer saw him named by Wisden as one of its five Cricketers of the Year.

== Later career ==
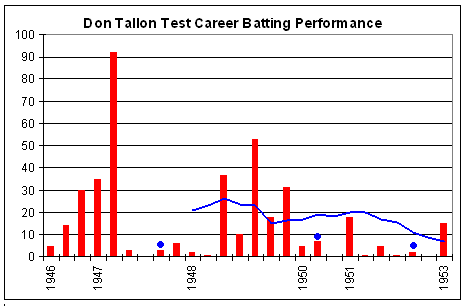
Don Tallon's Test career batting performance chart. The red bars indicate the runs that he scored in an innings, with the blue line indicating the batting average in his last ten innings. The blue dots indicate an innings where he remained not out.

Upon Tallon's return to Australia, he made an unbeaten 146 in Bradman's Testimonial match at the MCG in December 1948. He featured in a tenth-wicket partnership of 100 with Geff Noblet, who scored only nine as Tallon farmed the strike effectively. This saw the match scores tied on the last ball of the match. Tallon also made seven dismissals for the match. Queensland lost more than they won during the season, but Tallon continued to be productive, scoring 453 runs at 34.85 and making 26 dismissals in seven matches.

Tallon was selected for but withdrew from the 1949–50 tour to South Africa due to illness caused by stomach ulcers, and employment reasons. His place was taken by Saggers, who made 21 dismissals in the five Tests. In the meantime, Tallon recovered and played in the Australian domestic season. After scoring 52 in the opening match for the season, he scored 98 and two scores of 58 not out to help Queensland end the season with consecutive wins. He ended with 349 runs at 43.63 and 11 dismissals in six matches. Tallon was selected for a brief tour of New Zealand at the end of the season with an Australian Second XI led by Bill Brown, and scored 116 in an unofficial Test in Dunedin. It was the top-score in Australia's 299 and the hosts led by only eight runs with one wicket in hand in their second innings when the match ended in a draw. Many of the matches during the tour were not first-class but in one such game, Tallon scored 70 not out as Australia defeated Otago by an innings.

For the home Ashes series of 1950–51 Tallon was fit once more and available for national selection. Despite making only 37 runs in four innings in the lead-up matches, Tallon was chosen for all five Tests. He had a poor time with the bat, making only 39 runs at an average of just 6.50. He took only eight catches, but kept tidily to retain his place in the team. His performances for Queensland were hardly more productive; he scored 161 runs at 16.10 and aside from a rain-affected draw, his state lost their remaining six matches.

By this time, Tallon was losing his hearing, and gained the derisive nickname Deafy. In one Test, he had been told by captain Lindsay Hassett before going out to bat that there was to be an appeal for bad light. Hassett said "go for the light" but Tallon misheard it as "go for a lash". Tallon walked out and was dismissed for a low score after attempting to attack the English bowlers, leaving his skipper displeased.

Tallon missed selection during the 1951–52 season due his increasingly error-prone glovework and a combination of health reasons including stomach ulcers and deafness. He did not play a first-class match because of lack of his fitness. In any case, Tallon had secretly been barred from selection by the Australian Board of Control for making unauthorised comments in the media; this fact was not revealed for half a century.

He was unable to reclaim his Test place in 1952–53 despite making 133 against the touring South Africans and 84 against New South Wales for Queensland before the Tests. Tallon totalled 508 runs at 33.87 for the season and made 33 dismissals in eight matches, including seven in one fixture against Western Australia, but failed to taste victory in a single Queensland match. His omission angered Queensland fans, who relentlessly heckled the Australians during the First Test against the tourists in Brisbane, making fun of the mistakes made by Tallon's replacement Gil Langley in particular.

He was selected for the 1953 tour of England, and scored 76 against Tasmania before the tourists departed. Despite making only 35 runs at 7.00 in the lead-up matches, Tallon was selected for the First Test at Trent Bridge, his first match at the top level in more than two years. He took two catches and scored a duck and 15. Hassett and his deputy Arthur Morris then made the decision to replace Tallon with Langley. Still troubled by stomach ulcers, Tallon played in another eight first-class matches for the tour, scoring 119 runs at 19.83. His most notable effort was an unbeaten 83 in an innings win over Kent. He was unable to regain his Test position.

Tallon retired in dramatic circumstances after the first match of the 1953–54 Sheffield Shield season. During the match, he suddenly took off his gloves and handed the keeping duties to Peter Burge. He scored 21 and 54 not out in a drawn match against New South Wales. Two months later, he played for Arthur Morris's XI against Hassett's XI, a testimonial match for the latter. Tallon made 17 not out and nine in a 121-run win. Tallon continued to play local cricket in Bundaberg for another decade.

== Style ==
Regarded as one of Australia's finest ever wicket-keepers, Tallon was lean and relatively tall for a wicket-keeper, standing 180 cm. Tallon's high acclaim among cricket pundits derived from his style, rather than raw statistics. In 21 Tests, Tallon kept wicket in 41 innings, making 58 dismissals at an average of 1.41 per innings. Modern Australian glovemen such as Rod Marsh and Ian Healy, both of whom held the Test world record for dismissals, averaged closer to two. Tallon's Test batting average of 17.13 pales in comparison to that of contemporary wicket-keepers such as Australia's Adam Gilchrist and Sri Lanka's Kumar Sangakkara, both of whom have made a double century and more than ten centuries. English wicket-keepers from two decades after World War II such as Godfrey Evans and Jim Parks scored two Test centuries apiece and averaged substantially more than Tallon.

Tallon had an understated style, which was without flourish or flamboyancy. He was known for his anticipation of the flight, length and spin of the ball. He was particularly regarded for his stumping efficiency and his ability to catch balls down the leg side. Tallon often stood up to the stumps for medium pace bowlers and he had a textbook stumping technique in which he lifted the bails without disturbing the stumps. Tallon's crouch was more pronounced than most other keepers and he rebounded upwards further and faster than others. He had a particularly smooth and graceful catching technique that left his hands undamaged from the ball's impact, the injury in England in 1948 being a notable exception that proved the rule. In recognising him as one of their five Cricketers of the Year in the 1949 Wisden, the Almanack noted that his hands resembled those of a violinist, while Bradman noted that all his "fine, longer fingers were intact" as though he had not played much cricket. According to his English counterpart Godfrey Evans, Tallon was the "best and most nimble keeper ever" while Australian teammate Alan Davidson called him the "Bradman of keepers". Due to financial reasons, Tallon could not afford new equipment and he used an outdated pair of iron-coated gloves for most of his career.

Strong driving and quick scoring were hallmarks of his batting, made possible by his swift footwork. According to Bradman, Tallon's batting was "attacking, positive and with a technique to rival most first-class batsmen". This led Bradman to select Tallon in his all-time best XI. Tallon was a vociferous and frequent appealer behind the stumps, something that led to complaints from opposition batsmen who felt that the pressure he exerted was unfair.

== Outside cricket ==
Tallon married his first wife Marjorie Beattie in 1946. The constant travel, interstate and overseas, took a toll on his marriage and the pair divorced in 1950. In 1954, he married Lynda Kirchner from his native Bundaberg, with whom he had two daughters. In retirement, Tallon helped his younger brother Mat in running a corner store in Bundaberg. His nephew Ross played one match for Queensland Colts in 1967–68. The Tallon bridge, built in 1995 in Bundaberg was named after the famous Bundabergian which links west & north Bundaberg. He died of heart disease on 7 September 1984 and was cremated.

== Test match performance ==
		Batting				Wicket-keeping			
Opposition	Matches	Runs	Average	High Score	100 / 50	Catches	Stumpings	Dismissals per innings	Most dismissals (Inns)
England	15	340	18.88	92	0/2	38	4	1.40	4
India	5	49	12.25	37	0/0	11	3	1.40	4
New Zealand	1	5	5.00	5	0/0	1	1	1.00	1
Overall	21	394	17.13	92	0/2	50	8	1.38	4

== See also ==
- List of Australian Test wicket-keepers
- Isis Highway
