= Crosskey =

Crosskey is an English surname and notable persons include:

- Henry William Crosskey (1826 – 1893), Unitarian minister and geologist
- Roger Ward Crosskey (1930 - 2017), Entomologist
- Thomas Roland Crosskey (1905 – 1971), Scottish cricketer
- William Crosskey (1894 – 1968), American legal historian
