= Australian cricket team in England in 1948 =

International cricket tour

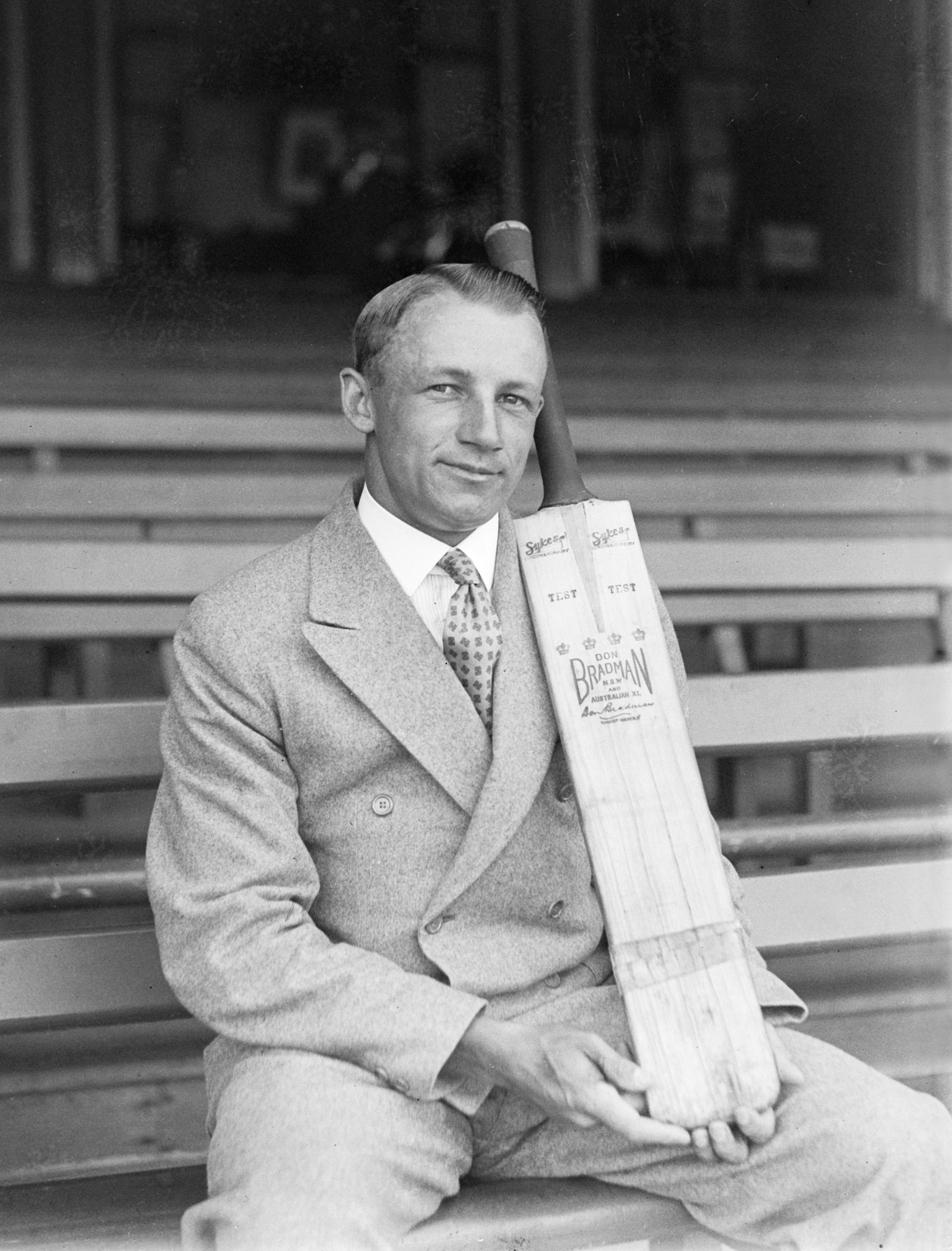
Don Bradman, the Australian captain

The Australian cricket team in England in 1948 is famous for being the only Test match team to play an entire tour of England without losing a match. This feat earned them the nickname of "The Invincibles", and they are regarded as one of the greatest cricket teams of all time. According to the Australian federal government, the team "is one of Australia's most cherished sporting legends". The team was captained by Don Bradman, who was making his fourth and final tour of England.

Including five Test matches, Australia played a total of 34 matches, of which 31 were first-class, between 28 April and 18 September. Two of the non-first-class matches were played in Scotland. They had a busy schedule, with 112 days of play scheduled in 144 days, meaning that they often played every day of the week except Sunday. Their record in the first-class games was 23 won and 8 drawn; in all matches, they won 25 and drew 9; many of the victories were by large margins. They won the Test series 4–0 with one draw.

The strength of the Australian team was based around its formidable batting line-up, which included Bradman, Arthur Morris, vice-captain Lindsay Hassett, Neil Harvey and Sid Barnes, and the hostile fast bowling of Ray Lindwall, Keith Miller and Bill Johnston.

Due to the popularity of Bradman, generally regarded as the greatest batsman of all time, and the fact that he had announced that it was his farewell international tour, the Australians were greeted with much fanfare across the country, and many records for match attendances were broken. The record for Test attendance at a match in England was broken thrice: in the Second, Third and Fourth Tests, and stands to this day.

== Touring party ==
- Keith Johnson (manager)
- Donald Bradman (captain)
- Lindsay Hassett (vice-captain)
- Ray Lindwall
- Keith Miller
- Sam Loxton
- Neil Harvey
- Bill Brown
- Arthur Morris
- Don Tallon (wicket-keeper)
- Sid Barnes
- Ian Johnson
- Bill Johnston
- Ernie Toshack
- Doug Ring
- Ron Hamence
- Colin McCool
- Ron Saggers (wicket-keeper)

== Significance ==
The 1948 Australian team has great significance in cricket history, as it is the only team to tour England unbeaten, earning the sobriquet "The Invincibles". The tour was captain Donald Bradman's last Test series, and the immediate postwar team was the most successful that Bradman appeared in. It has been claimed that English cricket suffered more heavily from the effects of World War II than the Australians. Even so, various commentators have rated the 1948 Australians as one of the best cricket teams ever, and it is often compared to other great outfits such as the 1902 Australian touring team, Warwick Armstrong's Australian team of just after World War I, the West Indies team of the 1980s, and the Australian team of the 1990s and 2000s.

The high regard with which The Invincibles are held in the annals of Australian and world cricket is reflected in the various honours accorded to the players. Bradman, Lindwall and Miller were among the ten inaugural inductees into the Australian Cricket Hall of Fame in 1996. Hassett, Morris and Harvey were later inducted, so that 20% of the inductees are from the 1948 team. Of these six, all except Hassett were selected in Australia's Team of the Century, with Bradman as captain and Miller his deputy. Bradman, Lindwall, Miller and Harvey are among a group of only 14 Australians in a total of 60 players who have been inducted into the International Cricket Council's Hall of Fame. In The Ten Greatest Test Teams by Tom Graveney (with Norman Miller), ten teams were compared by a computer, and the 1948 Australians emerged second behind the 1984 West Indians. Graveney strongly disagreed with the result, writing 'there has not been a better team in my lifetime than Don Bradman's Australian tourists of 1948'. The computer regarded Sam Loxton as a member of the team as he played more Tests in the series than Neil Harvey; if Harvey had been picked, the Australians would have been the superior team.

The three Queensland players selected in the touring party—Don Tallon, Bill Brown, and Colin McCool—were all from Toombul District Cricket Club.

== Preparations ==
Since the resumption of cricket following World War II, Australia had played 11 Tests and had been unbeaten. In 1946–47, they won the five-Test series against England 3–0, and followed this with a 4–0 series win over India in the following season. Australia were regarded as an extremely strong team in the lead-up to the tour of England, and their captain Donald Bradman publicly expressed his desire to achieve the unprecedented feat of going through the five-month tour without defeat.

The committee that selected the touring party was Bradman, Jack Ryder and Chappie Dwyer. They held their final meeting on Wednesday 11 February and announced the team that day. The team was chosen with a dual emphasis on strong batting and fast bowling. This was in large part because England had agreed to make a new ball available after 55 six-ball overs in the Tests; a new ball was generally taken after every 200 runs, which usually takes more than 55 overs to accumulate, the rule change meant that a new ball was more frequently available. A new ball is more helpful to fast bowling, so this move favoured the team with the better pace attack, in this case Australia.

Australia had injury concerns to key players ahead of the tour. Chronic knee injuries had begun to hamper medium-pacer Toshack, and he only made the trip after a 3–2 vote by a medical panel, despite being one of the first players chosen by the selectors on cricketing merit. Leading paceman Lindwall had been playing with an injured leg tendon. In addition, his foot drag during the delivery stride led to speculation about the legality of his bowling action. The injury was worked on ahead of the tour, while Bradman advised Lindwall on how to rectify any suspicion over his bowling action. The Australian captain advised his bowler to ensure that his foot was further behind the line than usual to avoid being no-balled, and to operate below full speed until the umpires were satisfied. Bradman's counsel was effective, as Lindwall did not have a no-ball problem during the tour.

Bill Jeanes, who was secretary of the Australian Board of Control and had managed the previous Australian tour of England in 1938, was offered the job of managing the 1948 team, but he turned it down. Jeanes had become increasingly unpopular among the players because of an approach that cricket historian Gideon Haigh has called "increasingly officious and liverish". He was replaced by Keith Johnson, the New South Wales delegate to the Australian Board of Control. Johnson had previously managed the Australian Services team—which included Keith Miller and Lindsay Hassett—in the Victory Tests that took place in 1945 at the conclusion of the Second World War in Europe.

=== Warm-up matches in Australia ===
Before they sailed for England, Australia played three warm-up matches. The first two were two-day games against Tasmania in Hobart and at the Northern Tasmanian Cricket Association Ground, Launceston; the third was a three-day match against Western Australia in Perth. In Hobart, Australia scored 538/5 declared, with centuries by Barnes, Hassett and Harvey in reply to 122. Using a mixture of pace and spin, they reduced Tasmania to 186/7 when time ran out. In Launceston, Australia won by an innings and 49 runs. Toshack took 5/24 as Tasmania fell for 123. Australia then scored 288 before five bowlers shared the wickets as Tasmania fell for just 116, Barnes taking 3/1. Four days later, on Saturday 13 March, the Australians were at the WACA Ground where they found a tougher test from Western Australia. Western Australia scored 348 as Wally Langdon made 112, while five bowlers took two wickets each. Australia replied with 442/7 declared, including 115 apiece by Morris and Bradman. Western Australia only had time to reach 62/3 and the game was drawn. The match attracted a total crowd of 30,500.

== Voyage and stopover in Ceylon ==
The team set sail on board RMS Strathaird from Fremantle on Friday 19 March. En route to England, the Australians berthed in Colombo where they played a one-day single-innings match—not limited overs—against the Ceylon national team at the Colombo Oval. The local newspaper The Islander ran a headline of "Bradman Will Definitely Play" and this guaranteed a crowd of more than 20,000. Australia batted first and became suspicious about the pitch as the morning went on. At lunch, Ian Johnson demanded that the pitch be measured and it was found to be only 20 yards (18 m) long. After that, the bowlers delivered from two yards behind the crease. Australia made 184/8 declared (Barnes 49, Miller 46) before a monsoon ended the match with Ceylon at 46/2 in reply.

The party docked at Tilbury on Friday 16 April to a resounding welcome. Bradman announced the delivery of 17,000 food parcels as a gift to the British people from the State of Victoria. Great Britain was still in the throes of rationing and post-war austerity.

== Popularity ==
Despite Australia's ruthless on-field dominance and a succession of one-sided victories, the touring team drew unprecedented levels of spectator and media interest. Bradman's dominant cricketing stature was a key factor in his team's popularity with the public, especially as it was known that it would be his last international campaign. A leading cricket writer of the time, R. C. Robertson-Glasgow, said "we want him to do well. We feel we have a share in him. He is more than Australian. He is a world batsman." The Australian journalist Andy Flanagan said that "cities, towns and hotels are beflagged, carpets set down, and dignitaries wait to extend an official welcome. He is the Prince of Cricketers." Writing later, Haigh opined that "perhaps no touring cricketer ... has been as feted as Bradman in that northern summer". Bradman received hundreds of personal letters every day, and one of his dinner speeches was broadcast live, causing the British Broadcasting Corporation to postpone the news bulletin. Of Bradman's retirement, Robertson-Glasgow said in the 1949 Wisden Cricketers' Almanack: "... a miracle has been removed from among us ... So must ancient Italy have felt when she heard of the death of Hannibal."

As a team, the Australians were greeted by record crowds and gate receipts across the country, even when wet weather curtailed the matches. The record attendance for a Test match in England was broken three times, in the Second Test at Lord's, the Third Test at Old Trafford, and the Fourth Test at Headingley. The 158,000 spectators that watched the proceedings at Headingley remain a record for a Test on English soil.

Off the field, the Australians were inundated with requests for social functions, including appointments with government officials and members of the royal family, and they had to juggle a plethora of off-field engagements, with 112 days of scheduled cricket in the space of 144 days. Three-day matches were often held consecutively with only the traditional Sunday rest day, although their dominance ended several matches prematurely and earned them extra rest days.

Team manager Keith Johnson, the only administrator in the touring party, was flooded with phone calls and letters. Bradman later said he was worried that Johnson's tireless work would cause health problems and that "it was the tribute to a bulldog determination to see the job through". Wisden said "Indebtedness for the smooth running of the tour and general harmony of the team was due largely to the manager, Mr Keith Johnson, hard-working and always genial ... Paying tribute to the loyalty of the players, Mr Johnson said there had not been a discordant note in the party throughout the tour." Bradman said that "no side could have wished for a better manager".

== Bradman's role ==
Bradman's position as a selector gave him more power than previous Australian captains, who did not have an explicit vote in team selection. This was further magnified by Bradman being a member of the Board of Control while still an active player, a threefold combination that he alone has occupied in Australian cricket history. According to Haigh, he "was the dominant figure in Australian cricket", and an "unimpeachable figure". At the age of 40, Bradman was by four years the oldest player on the team; three-quarters of his team were 32 or younger, and some viewed him as a father figure. Bradman wrote that this was the most personally fulfilling period of his playing days, as the divisiveness of the 1930s had passed. He wrote:

Knowing the personnel, I was confident that here at last was the great opportunity which I had longed for. A team of cricketers whose respect and loyalty were unquestioned, who would regard me in a fatherly sense and listen to my advice, follow my guidance and not question my handling of affairs ... there are no longer any fears that they will query the wisdom of what you do. The result is a sense of freedom to give full reign to your own creative ability and personal judgment.

However, some players expressed displeasure at Bradman's ruthless obsession towards annihilating the opposition. Miller deliberately allowed himself to be bowled first ball for a duck in a protest against Australia's world record of 721 runs in one day against Essex. He also deplored Bradman's hard-nosed attitude in fixtures nominally designated as "festival matches". Feeling that Bradman was needlessly batting Australia far beyond impregnability, Miller played with reckless aggression, rather than a measured style in line with his captain's aim of remaining undefeated. Bradman's letters in later life, published posthumously, revealed his hostility towards Miller. Sid Barnes later criticised Bradman for his reluctance to allow Ron Hamence—one of the reserve batsmen—to partake in meaningful matchplay due to captain's reluctance to risk Australia's unbeaten run.

== Roles and strategy ==
As matches often started the day after the previous fixture, sometimes amounting to six days of cricket a week—Sunday was always a rest day—Australia employed a rotation policy in order to allow the players to recuperate, except for the Tests and matches against Worcestershire, the Marylebone Cricket Club and the Leveson-Gower's XI, when they chose their strongest team. As a result, no member of the squad—Bradman included—played in more than 23 of the first-class matches. Thus, the vice-captain Hassett led the Australians in nine tour matches while Bradman was rested, and maintained the unbeaten run in all of them. Wisden opined that "in addition to his playing ability Hassett's cheerfulness and leadership, which extended to off-the-field relaxation as well as in the more exacting part of the programme, combined to make him an ideal vice-captain able to lift a considerable load off Bradman's busy shoulders".

Likewise, the batting was regularly rotated. The three openers Barnes, Morris and Brown took turns sitting out, while the middle-order was changed frequently and the wicket-keeping duties divided between Tallon and Saggers.

Australia's bowling attack was led by Lindwall and Miller, who took the new ball in the Tests. Bradman used the pair in short and fiery bursts with the new ball. English cricket administrators had agreed to make a new ball available every 55 overs; at the time, the norm was to allow a new ball for every 200 runs scored, something that usually took longer than 55 overs. The new regulation played directly into the hands of the Australians, as a new ball is ideal for fast bowling and the tourists had a vastly superior pace attack. Bradman thus wanted to preserve his two first-choice pacemen for a vigorous attack on the English batsmen every 55 overs. As a result, Australia's third fast bowler Bill Johnston bowled the most overs, and the left arm seamer Ernie Toshack also had a heavy workload until a knee injury ended his campaign.

The new ball rule also meant that spin bowling was less effective in the Tests, so Australia only used one full-time spinner in the Tests, off spinner Johnson, until his omission in favour of leg spinner Ring. Together they took only eight wickets.

Things were different in the county matches. As Bradman wanted to keep Lindwall and Miller fresh for the Tests, he generally gave them a lighter workload against the weaker opposition in the county matches, and the three spinners Ring, Johnson and McCool did more of the work, especially as the 55-over rule did not apply outside the Tests. Ring did the second-most bowling outside the Tests, despite not being in Bradman's first-choice team. Bradman even used Hamence, a reserve batsman, to open the bowling at times, in order to rest his bowlers, and in the second match against Yorkshire, decided to bat for an extended period instead of going for a win, so that his bowlers could recuperate.

=== Key players ===
Bill Brown, was successful in the tour matches when he played as an opener. He ended the tour with eight centuries and a total of 1,448 first-class runs at an average of 57.92, behind only Bradman, Hassett and Morris in the runs and averages, with a highest score of 200 against Cambridge University. Brown's tally of eight centuries was second only to Bradman, and took his tally on English soil to 18 first-class tons. A very occasional off spinner, Brown took 4/16 against the South of England in his only first-class bowling assignment of the tour. It was his best career bowling figures—he accumulated only six wickets in his first-class career. He also took 18 catches in the first-class fixtures.

Bill Johnston was a key member of Donald Bradman's famous Australian cricket team, which toured England in 1948. He was the equal-leading wicket-taker in the Tests (27 along with Lindwall) and Australia's most prolific wicket-taker in the first-class matches with 102. The latter feat made him the last Australian to take a century of wickets on an Ashes tour. In recognition of his achievements, Johnston was chosen as one of the five Wisden Cricketers of the Year. Wisden said "no Australian made a greater personal contribution to the playing success of the 1948 side".

Ian Johnson played in four of the five Tests before being dropped for the final rubber. He also played in the matches against Worcestershire, the MCC and Leveson-Gower's XI, where Australia selected their strongest possible team. In the tour matches, he bowled more overs than anyone but Johnston, allowing Bradman to ease the workload on his pace spearheads Lindwall and Miller, allowing them to conserve energy ahead of the Tests. Johnson's most successful game with the ball was against Gloucestershire, which yielded match figures of 11/100.

Ray Lindwall led the Test bowling averages, with 27 wickets at 19.62, making him the equal leading wicket-taker along with Johnston. He was the least economical of the three pacemen, but took his wickets more frequently than any other frontline bowler. In all first-class matches, he took 86 wickets at 15.68 and held onto 14 catches, fielding in the slips. Lindwall had limited batting opportunities, usually playing from No. 7 to No. 9. As Australia often won by an innings, and declared in the first innings on many occasions due to their batting strength, Lindwall only had 20 innings in his 22 matches, and usually batted at numbers 7, 8 or 9.^{N-}^{[1]} However, he was often effective when he did get an opportunity.

Sam Loxton played as a right-handed middle-order batsman and a right-arm fast medium bowler who reinforced the frontline pace attack of Lindwall, Miller and Bill Johnston. Of the seven regular bowlers, Loxton was the only one who was not a frontline bowler, and as such he had the worst average, the second-worst economy rate and the third-worst strike rate. Loxton ended the Test series with 144 runs at 48.00 and three wickets at 49.33, having bowled 63 overs. Loxton batted at No. 6 or No. 7 during the Tests, and was the last batsman in the batting order before the wicket-keeper and the bowlers.

Keith Miller played as a specialist batsman even when he was unable to bowl due to injury, such as during the Second Test. With 13 wickets in the Tests, Miller was third among the Australians behind Lindwall and Johnston, who took 27 apiece. Owing to his fragility, Miller was used sparingly compared to the other four Australian frontline bowlers: Toshack and Johnson each delivered more than 170 overs despite playing in one less Test, while Lindwall bowled 224 and Johnston 306 in five matches. In all first-class matches, Miller took 56 wickets at 17.58 and held onto 20 catches.

Arthur Morris played in all five Tests, partnering the right-handed Sid Barnes in three Tests but was injured in the Third and Fourth Tests. Barnes was unable to open in the former and did not play in the latter. In the Test series and the opening match against Worcestershire, Australia fielded its first-choice team; Brown played out of position in the middle order, while Morris and Barnes opened. Morris ended the first-class matches with 1,922 runs at 71.18 including seven centuries, ranking him second in runs only to Bradman (2,428 at 89.92) and substantially ahead of third-placed Hassett (1,563 at 74.42). He did so despite being troubled by a split between the first and second fingers of his left hand, caused by constant jarring from the bat as he played the ball. The wound often opened while he was batting.

Don Tallon had had moderate success with his batting during the Test series, aggregating 114 runs at 28.50. Tallon took 29 catches and 14 stumpings for the first-class matches during the tour. Tallon scored 283 runs at 25.72 for the season at an average higher than Saggers's 23.22. In all his matches on tour, Tallon conceded 249 byes as Australia conceded 5331 runs, a bye percentage of 4.67%, compared to Saggers's 221 byes from 6190 runs, a percentage of 3.57%.^{N-}^{[4]} During the tour, Tallon had few opportunities with the bat, generally batting between No. 8 and No. 9,^{N-}^{[4]}.

Ernie Toshack played in the first four Tests before being struck down by a persistent knee injury. Toshack contained the English batsmen using leg theory in between the new ball bursts of Miller and Lindwall. During the Tests, Toshack took 11 wickets at 33.09; his most notable performance was his 5/40 in the second innings of the Second Test at Lord's.

== Ashes Test matches ==
The five-Test Ashes series was won convincingly by Australia 4–0. England was captained by Norman Yardley and their batting was strong on paper, the first four in the order generally being Len Hutton, Cyril Washbrook, Bill Edrich and Denis Compton. They were supported by the likes of Joe Hardstaff, Jr., Tom Dollery, Charlie Barnett, Jack Crapp, John Dewes, Allan Watkins, Yardley and wicket-keeper Godfrey Evans. However, they found the fast bowling trio of Lindwall, Miller and Johnston—supported by the medium pace of Toshack—a real handful, especially with the 55-over new ball rule.

Lindwall and Miller were groundbreaking fast bowlers, with high pace and the ability to deliver menacing short-pitched bowling at the upper body of the batsmen. Prior to World War II, pace bowlers were generally much slower and rarely bowled at the body. England were yet to develop similar bowlers, and as a result, Australia were able to pepper the upper body of the opposition without fear of retaliation. At one stage, the Australian short-pitched barrage prompted the English selectors to drop leading batsman Hutton, something that provoked great controversy. Lindwall and Johnston dominated the home batsmen and took 27 wickets apiece, at averages of 19.62 and 23.33 respectively, while the injury-prone Miller took 13 at 23.15. For England, the batsman emerging with most credit was Compton, who scored 562 runs at 62.44. Washbrook (356 runs at 50.85) was the only other player to average beyond 45.

In contrast, Australia's batsmen had relatively little difficulty against the hosts' attack. England's bowling was largely reliant on Alec Bedser and against a powerful Australian batting line-up he managed only 18 wickets at 38.22. Alec Coxon, Dick Pollard, Edrich, Barnett and Yardley provided his seam support. Jim Laker, Jack Young, Eric Hollies and Doug Wright were the spinners in action. Bedser was the only English bowler to take more than nine wickets. Morris led the runscoring and century-making with 696 runs at 87.00 and three triple-figure scores, supported by Bradman (508 at 72.57) and Barnes (329 at 82.25). With the first three batsmen in such form, Australia regularly made strong starts to their innings, averaging more than 120 for their first two wickets.

The resounding Australian victories gave the England selectors many problems as they sought to find a combination that could challenge the tourists' superiority. As a result, England used 21 players in all, while Australia only used 15, one of which was forced by injury. Australia had ten players who competed in four or more Tests, while England only had seven such players.

=== First Test ===
England
165

JC Laker 63
WA Johnston 5/36

&
441

DCS Compton 184
KR Miller 4/125

Australia won by eight wickets

Trent Bridge, Nottingham
Umpires: F Chester, E Cooke

Australia
509

DG Bradman 138
JC Laker 4/138

&
98/2

SG Barnes 64*
AV Bedser 2/46

Since the Second World War, Australia had played 11 Tests and had been unbeaten. In 1946–47, they won the five-Test series against England 3–0, and followed this with a 4–0 series win over India in the following season. Australia were regarded as an extremely strong team in the lead-up to the tour of England, and Bradman publicly expressed his desire to achieve the unprecedented feat of going through the five-month tour without defeat. Prior to the First Test, Australia had played 12 first-class matches, winning ten and drawing two. Eight of the victories were by an innings, and another was by eight wickets.

It was thought that Bradman would play Ring, but he changed his mind on the first morning of the First Test when rain was forecast. Johnston was played in the hope of exploiting a wet wicket and he amply rewarded his captain by taking the most wickets of any bowler in the match. Yardley won the toss and elected to bat.

The first innings set the pattern of the series as the England top-order struggled against Australia's pace attack. Only twenty minutes of play was possible before the lunch break due to inclement weather, but it was enough for Miller to bowl Hutton. During the interval, heavy rain made the ball skid through upon resumption. Washbrook was caught attempting to hook Lindwall. At 15/2, Compton came in, and together with Edrich, they took the score to 46 before left arm paceman Johnston bowled the latter. Two balls later, Johnston removed Hardstaff without scoring, leaving England at 46/4. Two runs later, Compton was bowled by Miller and half the English team were out with only 48 runs on the board. Lindwall was forced to leave the field mid-innings due to a groin injury and did not bowl again. Johnston bowled Barnett and when Evans and Yardley were both dismissed with the score on 74, England only had two wickets left. Laker and Bedser scored more than half of England's total, adding 89 runs in only 73 minutes. Both fell within two runs, ending England's innings at 165. Laker top-scored with 63. Johnston ended with 5/36, a display characterised with accuracy and variations in pace and swing. Miller took 3/38 and a catch.

Australia's openers Morris and Barnes successfully negotiated the new ball by Edrich and Bedser to reach stumps with 17 without loss after 15 minutes. Ideal batting conditions greeted the players on the second day. Barnes and Morris took the score to 73 before Laker removed Morris. Bradman came in and the score progressed to 121 before Barnes was caught by wicket-keeper Evans with a one-handed diving effort for 62. Miller was then dismissed for a duck by Laker.

Australia scored slowly, as Yardley employed leg theory to slow the scoring. Brown came in at No. 5, but he had played most of his career as an opening batsman and appeared uncomfortable before falling for 24. Hassett came in and Australia reached stumps at 293/4, a lead of 128. Bradman reached his 28th Test century in over 210 minutes, with the last 29 runs taking 70 minutes. It was one of his slower innings as Yardley focused on stopping runs. On the third morning, Bradman added only eight before falling for 138 when he leg glanced an inswinger from Bedser to Hutton at short fine leg. Johnson and Tallon came and went, failing to pass 21. The scoring was slow during this passage of play—Young delivered 11 consecutive maiden overs. Lindwall came out to bat at 365/7 and he added 107 runs with Hassett for the eighth wicket. Hassett reached his century and proceeded to 137 in almost six hours of batting. Both fell in quick succession, but Australia's last-wicket pair of Johnston and Toshack wagged a further 33 runs in only 18 minutes before Bedser ended the innings on 509, leaving the tourists with a 344-run lead. Yardley placed the majority of the bowling load on his spinners, with Young (1/79) and Laker (4/138) bowling 60 and 55 overs respectively. Bedser bowled 44.2 overs, taking 3/113.

At the start of England's second innings, Washbrook and Edrich fell early, leaving England at 39/2. This brought together England's leading batsmen, Hutton and Compton, who took the score to 121 without further loss by stumps on the third day. Miller battled with Hutton and Compton through the afternoon, delivering five bouncers in the last over of the day. One of these struck Hutton high on his left arm. The batsmen survived, but Miller received a hostile reaction from the crowd. The English had the better of the late afternoon period, scoring 82 runs together in 70 minutes.

Hutton resumed on 63 and he and Compton progressed before the light deteriorated and a thunderstorm stopped proceedings. Shortly after the resumption, Miller bowled Hutton with an off cutter in the dark conditions, ending a 111-run partnership at 150/3. The innings was then repeatedly interrupted by poor light. Wisden opined that "rarely can a Test Match have been played under such appalling conditions as on this day". Hardstaff supported Compton in a partnership of 93 before being removed by Toshack, and Barnett followed soon after at 264/5. Compton brought up his third consecutive century at Trent Bridge, aided by a 57-run partnership with his captain before Johnston dismissed Yardley for 22. England reached stumps at 345/6, just one run ahead, with Compton on 154.

Compton and Evans continued to resist the Australians on the final morning, which was briefly interrupted twice by rain. After the resumption, Compton was out hit wicket for 184 after attempting to hook Miller. He had batted for 413 minutes and hit 19 fours. Wisden opined that "No praise could be too high for the manner in which Compton carried the side's responsibilities and defied a first-class attack in such trying circumstances". Compton's fall at 405/7 exposed the bowlers and Australia quickly finished off the innings within half an hour. England finished at 441, leaving Australia a target of 98. Lindwall's absence meant that the remaining four frontline bowlers had to bowl more than 32 overs each—Johnston bowled 59 and ended with 4/147 while Miller took 4/125 from 44 overs. Australia progressed steadily to 38 before Bedser bowled Morris for nine and then dismissed Bradman for a duck, again caught by Hutton at short fine leg. This left Australia 48/2. Hassett joined Barnes and they reached the target without further loss. Barnes ended on 64 with 11 boundaries.

=== Second Test ===
Australia
350

AR Morris 105
AV Bedser 4/100

&
460/7 declared

SG Barnes 141
NWD Yardley 2/36

Australia won by 409 runs

Lord's, London
Umpires: CN Woolley, D Davies

England
215

DCS Compton 53
RR Lindwall 5/70

&
186

C. Washbrook & HE Dollery 37
ERH Toshack 5/40

Australia retained the same XI from the First Test at Trent Bridge. On the other hand, England made three changes; the leg spinner Wright had regained fitness and replaced the left arm orthodox of Young, all rounder Coxon made his Test debut in place of Barnett and Dollery replaced Hardstaff as the No. 5. batsman. Following his injury in the previous Test, Lindwall was subjected to a thorough fitness test on the first morning and was only included after protesting to Bradman, who gambled on his inclusion. Australia won the toss and elected to bat. Miller played, but was unfit to bowl.

Barnes fell for a duck, and Morris and Bradman rebuilt the innings, slowly taking the score to 87 before Bradman was caught for the third consecutive time by Hutton in the leg trap off Bedser. In the meantime, Morris, after a slow start, made 105 runs out of a total of 166 scored while he was at the wicket, including 14 fours and one six. His innings was noted for powerful, well-placed cover drives. His dismissal left Australia at 166/3, quickly followed by Miller, left Australia at 173/4. Hassett and Brown rebuilt the innings slowly, taking more than three and half minutes on average for each run. Hassett was dropped three times before Yardley removed him and Brown in the space of nine runs to leave Australia 225/6. Johnson fell soon after and England were well placed when Australia ended the day on 258/7.

Australia's lower order batted the tourists into control on the second morning. Tallon batted on, supported by Johnston and Toshack, who scored their highest Test scores. Australia's wicket-keeper put on 45 with Johnston—who scored 29. Toshack then joined Johnston and the last pair put on 30 more runs before Johnston fell. Bedser was the most successful of the bowlers, ending with 4/100 from 43 overs, while debutant Coxon took 2/90 from 35 overs.

Lindwall took the new ball and felt pain in his groin again after delivering his first ball. He persevered through the pain and removed Washbrook in his fourth over. Hutton then fell to Johnson to leave England at 32/2. Lindwall then clean bowled Edrich before doing the same to Dollery for a duck two balls later. England were 46/4 and Australia were firmly in control. Compton was joined by his skipper Yardley and the pair rebuilt the innings, scoring 87 runs together in 100 minutes. After the tea break, Lindwall and Johnston returned with the new ball. Compton edged Johnston to be out for 53. One run later, Lindwall bowled Yardley to leave England at 134/6 with their skipper dismissed for 44. Johnson then removed Evans for nine, before Coxon and Laker added 41 for the eighth wicket. After 85 minutes of resistance, Johnston removed both. England's last pair added ten runs to close at stumps on 9/207.

On the third morning, Lindwall removed Bedser, ending England's innings at 215, giving Australia a 135 first innings lead. Lindwall ended with 5/70. The weather was fine as Australia started their second innings. Barnes was given an early life and he took advantage to combine with Morris in an opening stand of 122 before Morris was bowled for 62. Bradman joined Barnes at the crease and they amassed 174 runs for the second wicket. Barnes accelerated after reaching his half-century. Once he reached his century, Barnes became particularly aggressive. He dispatched one Laker over for 21 runs, including two successive sixes before finally falling for 141, caught on the boundary from Yardley. He had struck 14 boundaries and two sixes in his innings. The speed of his batting had allowed Australia to be 296/2 after 277 minutes when he departed. Hassett was bowled first ball, so Miller came to the crease at 296/3 to face Yardley's hat-trick ball. Miller survived a loud leg before wicket appeal on the hat-trick ball. Bradman fell to Bedser again, this time for 89. Brown joined Miller at 329/4 and Australia reached stumps at 343, without further loss.

After the rest day, the fourth morning was punctuated by three rain stoppages. In 88 minutes of play, Australia added a further 117 runs. Brown was caught behind from Coxon for 32 after an 87-run partnership with Miller, who was out for 74, followed by Lindwall for 25. Bradman declared with Australia at 460/7, 595 runs ahead. Yardley and Laker had been the only multiple wicket-takers, with two each.

Further showers breathed extra life into the pitch, and Lindwall and Johnston extracted steep bounce with the new ball, troubling the English batsmen. Hutton was dropped before he had scored and played and missed multiple times. Hutton and Washbrook took the score to 42, before Hutton edged Lindwall and was out for 13. Toshack removed Edrich and Washbrook in quick succession to leave England at 65/3. However, Compton and Dollery added 41 to have England close at 106/3.

The final day started poorly for England, with Compton being caught off Johnston from the second ball of the day. Yardley and Dollery took the score to 133 before Toshack took two wickets in the same over. Eight runs later, Dollery was bowled from a Lindwall bouncer that stayed low. Lindwall bowled Laker for a duck later in the same over to leave England at 141/8. England were bowled out for 186, ceding a 409-run victory. Toshack ended the innings with 5/40, while Lindwall and Johnston took three and two respectively. The gross attendance was 132,000 and receipts were £43,000 – a record for a Test in England.

=== Third Test ===
England
363

DCS Compton 145*
RR Lindwall 4/99

&
174/3 declared

C. Washbrook 85*
ERH Toshack 1/26

Drawn

Old Trafford, Manchester
Umpires: D Davies, F Chester

Australia
221

AR Morris 51
AV Bedser 4/81

&
92/1

AR Morris 54*
JA Young 1/31

When the teams reconvened at Old Trafford for the Third Test, Hutton had been dropped. The reason was said to be Hutton's struggles with Lindwall's short-pitched bowling. The omission generated considerable controversy. and the Australians were pleased, feeling that Hutton was England's best batsman. Hutton's opening position was taken by debutant Emmett. England made three further changes. Young and Pollard replaced Wright and Laker in the bowling department. Coxon was replaced by debutant batsman Jack Crapp. Australia dropped Brown, who had scored 73 runs at 24.33 in three innings, for the all rounder Loxton. Yardley won the toss and elected to bat.

The change in England's opening pair did not result in better results. A run out was narrowly avoided from the first ball, and Washbrook and Emmett appeared to be uncomfortable on a surface that helped the bowlers. Both fell early, leaving England 28/2. Edrich eschewed attacking strokeplay as he and Compton attempted to establish themselves. Compton attempted to hook a Lindwall bouncer, but edged it into his face. This forced him to leave the field with a bloodied eyebrow with the score at 33/2. Edrich and Crapp then engaged in grim defensive batting, resulting in one 25-minute period where only one run was added. They reached lunch at 57/2. Upon the resumption, Crapp accelerated, hitting a six and three boundaries from Johnson. Australia took the new ball and Lindwall trapped Crapp lbw for 37. Dollery then fell for one. England had lost two wickets for one run to be 97/4. After 170 minutes of slow batting, Edrich fell to Lindwall. At 119/5, Compton returned to the field, his wound having been stitched. Yardley fell for 22 with the score at 141/6, bringing Evans to the crease. Compton and Evans added 75 runs, before Lindwall removed the latter to leave England at 216/7.

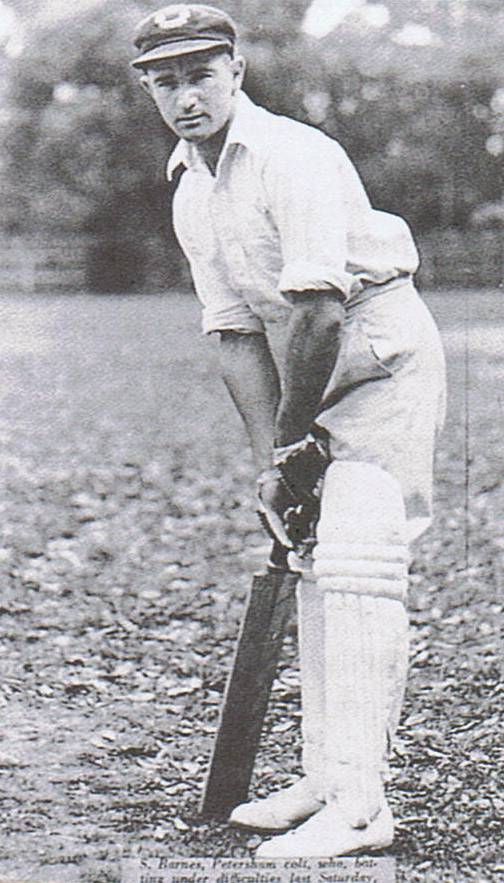
Barnes (pictured at the age of 16) was taken to hospital after being hit in the ribs.

England resumed on the second day at 231/7 and Australia was unable to break through with the new ball. Bedser defied the Australians for 145 minutes, adding 37 and featuring in a 121-run partnership with Compton. Soon after, Pollard pulled a ball from Johnson into the ribs of Barnes, who was standing at short leg, forcing him into hospital. The last two wickets fell and England were bowled out for 363. Compton was unbeaten on 145 in 324 minutes of batting, having struck 16 fours. Lindwall took 4/99 and Johnston 3/67.

Barnes's injury left Australia with only Morris as a specialist opener. Johnson was deployed as Australia's makeshift second opener, but made only one, and Bradman fell for seven to leave Australia at 13/2. Morris and Hassett rebuilt the innings, adding 69 for the third wicket in 101 minutes before Hassett fell. Miller joined Morris and they took the score to 126/3 at stumps.

Australia had added only nine runs on the third morning when Miller fell for 31. Four runs later, Morris fell for 51, leaving Australia 139/5. Barnes came in, despite having collapsed in the nets due to the lingering effects of the blow to his chest. He made a painful single before the pain forced him back to hospital. Tallon and Loxton added a further 43 before Tallon fell. Lindwall came into bat at 172/6 with Australia facing the prospect of the follow on. Loxton and Lindwall added a further 36 before the former was bowled, leaving Australia 208/7, five runs behind the follow-on mark. Johnston helped Lindwall advance Australia beyond the follow on before Bedser removed both and Australia were bowled out for 221, giving England a lead of 142 runs. During his innings, Lindwall was given a series of bouncers by Edrich. One of the short-pitched balls hit Lindwall in the hand, evoking cheers from the crowd. Bedser and Pollard were the most successful bowlers, taking 4/81 and 3/53 respectively.

Lindwall removed Emmett for a duck at the start of the second innings, bringing his tormentor Edrich to the crease. Lindwall did not bounce Edrich, but Miller did, earning the ire of the crowd. Edrich and Washbrook settled and put together a 124-run partnership in only 138 minutes. This was aided three dropped catches from Washbrook. Edrich struck eight boundaries and brought up his fifty with a six, but was immediately run out by Morris with a direct hit. Crapp joined Washbrook and helped see off the new ball, as England reached 174/3 at the close, with Washbrook unbeaten on 85.

The rest day was followed by the fourth day, which was abandoned due to persistent rain. Yardley declared at the start of the fifth day, leaving Australia a victory target of 317, but the rain meant that the entire first session was lost. The tourists batted in a defensive manner to ensure a draw. They ended at 92/1 in 61 overs. Morris finished unbeaten on 54, his fourth consecutive half-century of the Test series. The attendance of 133,740 exceeded the previous Test.

=== Fourth Test ===
England
496

C. Washbrook 143
SJ Loxton 3/55

&
365/8 declared

DCS Compton 66
WA Johnston 4/95

Australia won by seven wickets

Headingley, Leeds
Umpires: F Chester, HG Baldwin

Australia
458

RN Harvey 112
AV Bedser 3/92

&
404/3

AR Morris 182
K Cranston 1/28

Australia made two changes for the Test. Harvey replaced the injured Barnes, while Saggers replaced the injured Tallon behind the stumps. England made three changes. Emmett was dropped and Hutton was recalled to take his opening position. Laker replaced his left arm finger spinning colleague Young. Dollery, who had made only 38 in three innings, was replaced by all-rounder Cranston.

England won the toss and elected to bat on an ideal batting pitch. Hutton and Washbrook put on an opening partnership of 168, the best by England in the series. Washbrook refrained from the hook shot, which had caused him to lose his wicket on earlier occasions in the series. The partnership was ended when Hutton was bowled by Lindwall. Washbrook reached his century and joined by Edrich, the pair batted until late in the first day, when Washbrook was dismissed by Johnston for 143 in the last over of the day. His innings had included 22 boundaries and ended a second-wicket partnership that yielded exactly 100 runs. Bedser was sent in as the nightwatchman and survived as England closed at 268/2, with Edrich on 41.

The next day, Bedser batted on in steady support of Edrich. The pair saw England to lunch without further loss, and 155 runs were added for the third wicket before Bedser was out after almost three hours of batting for 79. Bedser had struck eight fours and two sixes. Edrich fell three runs later at 426/4 for 111. With two new batsmen at the crease, Australia quickly made further inroads to leave England at 473/6. Loxton then successively removed Cranston, Evans and Laker as England fell from 486/6 to 496/9, before Miller bowled Yardley to end England's innings at 496. The home team had lost their last eight wickets for the addition of 73 runs. Loxton took 3/55 while Lindwall and Johnson both took two. Australia lost the services of Toshack after he broke down with a knee injury. With Barnes injured, Hassett was moved from the middle order to open the innings with Morris. Morris fell for six, before Bradman and Hassett saw the tourists to stumps at 63/1. Bradman did the majority of the scoring, finishing unbeaten on 31.

On the third morning, England made the ideal start when Pollard removed Hassett for 13 and Bradman for 33 in the same over. This left Australia struggling at 68/3. Harvey, playing his first Ashes Test, joined Miller at the crease. Australia were more than 400 behind and Harvey told his senior partner "Let's get stuck into 'em". If England were to remove the pair, they would expose Australia's lower order and give themselves an opportunity to win by taking a substantial lead. The pair launched a counterattack, with Miller taking the lead with many lofted boundaries. This allowed Australia to seize the initiative, with Harvey joining in and hitting consecutive boundaries against Laker. Miller was dismissed by Yardley for 58 while attempting another six, but the partnership had yielded 121 runs in 90 minutes, prompting Wisden to liken it to a "hurricane". Harvey then shared another century stand with Loxton which yielded 105 in only 95 minutes. Harvey ended with a century on his Ashes debut, scoring 112 from 183 balls in an innings noted for powerful driving on both sides of the wicket. The high rate of scoring during the innings freed the match from England's firm control. Loxton was particularly severe on Laker, lifting his deliveries into the crowd for five sixes in addition to nine fours. At the other end, Harvey and Johnson fell to Laker in quick succession to leave the score at 329/6.

Australia was still some way behind when Lindwall replaced Johnson, and 15 runs later, Yardley bowled Loxton for 93, while Saggers only managed five, leaving Australia at 355/8 with only Johnston and Toshack remaining. Lindwall hit out, scoring 77 in an innings marked by powerful driving and pulling, dominating stands of 48 and 55 with Johnston and Toshack respectively. He was the last man out at 458, leaving Australia 38 runs in arrears on the first innings. Bedser took the final wicket to end with 3/92. Laker took 3/113, while Pollard and Yardley ended with two wickets each.

England set about extending their first innings lead for the remainder of the fourth day. For the second time in the match, Washbrook and Hutton put on a century opening partnership. Washbrook made 65 and Hutton 57, leaving England at 129/2. Edrich and Compton continued where the openers had left off, adding 103 before Lindwall trapped Edrich lbw for 54. England lost wickets at regular intervals late in the day to be 278/6. When Johnston removed Compton for 66, England were 7/293 with no recognised batsmen remaining, having lost 4/33. Wicket-keeper Evans led a rearguard action as England reached 362/8 at the close of the fourth day.

England batted on for five minutes on the final morning, adding three runs in two overs before Yardley declared at 365/8, with Evans on 47 not out. Johnston had the pick of the bowling figures, with 4/95. Batting into the final day allowed Yardley to ask the groundsman to use a heavy roller, which would help to break up the wicket and make the surface more likely to spin. This left Australia a target of 404 runs for victory. At the time, this would have been the highest ever fourth innings score to result in a Test victory for the batting team. Australia had only 345 minutes to reach the target, and the local press wrote them off, predicting that they would be dismissed by lunchtime on a deteriorating wicket expected to favour the spin bowlers. Morris and Hassett started slowly on a pitch that offered spin and bounce. Only 44 runs came in the first hour. Just 13 runs were added in the next 28 minutes before Hassett was dismissed by Compton's left arm unorthodox spin for 17 with the score at 57. Bradman joined Morris with 347 runs needed in 257 minutes and they began to attack; Morris hit three consecutive fours off Len Hutton's bowling as Australia reached lunch at 121/1. In the half-hour preceding the interval, Australia had added 64 runs. Both had given chances, but England fumbled them.

Upon resumption, Morris severely attacked Compton, who had been bowling in an attempt to exploit the spin, aided by a series of full tosses and long hops that were easily dispatched for runs. This prompted Yardley to take the new ball. Australia reached 202, halfway to the required total, with 165 minutes left. Morris passed his century, and was then dropped on 126. Bradman was given another life at 108 when Evans missed a stumping opportunity. Australia reached tea at 288/1 with Morris on 150. The pair had added 167 during the session. Morris was eventually dismissed by Yardley for 182, having partnered Bradman in a stand of 301 in 217 minutes. He struck 33 fours in 290 minutes of batting. This brought Miller to the crease with 46 runs still required. He fell with eight runs still needed. Harvey came in and got off the mark with a boundary that brought up the winning runs. Australia had won by seven wickets, setting a new world record for the highest successful Test run-chase, with Bradman unbeaten on 173 in only 255 minutes with 29 fours. The attendance of 158,000 was the highest for any cricket match on English soil and the takings were 34,000 pounds. The attendance remains a record for a Test in England.

=== Fifth Test ===
England
52

L Hutton 30
RR Lindwall 6/20

&
188

L Hutton 64
WA Johnston 4/40

Australia won by an innings and 149 runs

The Oval, London
Umpires: D Davies, HG Baldwin

Australia
389

AR Morris 196
WE Hollies 5/131

With the series already lost, England made four changes to their team. Dewes replaced the injured Washbrook, while Watkins replaced Cranston as an all-rounder. Both Dewes and Watkins were making their Test debut. England played two spinners; Young replaced fellow finger spinner Laker, while the leg spin of Hollies replaced Pollard's pace. The selectors were widely condemned for their incessant changes. Australia made three changes. Off spinner Johnson was replaced by the leg spin of Ring. Australia's second change was forced on them; the injured seamer Toshack was replaced by the recovered batsman Barnes. The final change was the return of wicket-keeper Tallon from injury.

The match saw Lindwall at his best. English skipper Yardley won the toss and elected to bat on a rain-affected pitch. Precipitation during the week meant that the start of the Test was delayed until the afternoon. The humid conditions, along with the rain, assisted the bowlers, with Lindwall in particular managing to make the ball bounce at variable heights.

Miller bowled Dewes for one with his second ball to leave England at 2/1, before Johnston removed Edrich for three to leave England at 10/2. Lindwall dismissed Compton after Morris had taken a diving catch, and Miller then removed Crapp, who failed to score in his 23-ball innings, leaving England at 23/4.

After the lunch break, England had struggled to 35/4, before Lindwall bowled Yardley with a swinging yorker. The debutant Watkins then batted for 16 balls without scoring before Johnston dismissed him for a duck to leave England at 42/6. Watkins also collected a bruise on the shoulder that inhibited his bowling later in the match. Lindwall then removed Evans, Bedser and Young, all yorked in the space of two runs. The innings ended at 52 when Hutton leg glanced and was caught by wicket-keeper Tallon, who grasped the ball one-handed at full stretch to his left. In his post-lunch spell, Lindwall bowled 8.1 overs, taking five wickets for eight runs, finishing with 6/20 in 16.1 overs. Bradman described the spell as "the most devastating and one of the fastest I ever saw in Test cricket". Hutton was the only batsman to resist, scoring 30 in 124 minutes from 147 deliveries. No other player passed seven. Miller and Johnston took 2/5 and 2/20 respectively, and Ring was not needed to bowl.

In contrast, Australia batted with apparent ease, and Morris and Barnes passed England's first innings total by themselves. The score had reached 117 before Barnes fell to Hollies for 61, ending a partnership that had taken only 126 minutes. This brought Bradman to the crease late on the first day. As Bradman had announced that the tour was his last at international level, the innings would be his last at Test level if Australia batted only once. The crowd gave him a standing ovation as he walked out to bat. Yardley led his team in giving Bradman three cheers. With 6996 Test career runs, he only needed four runs to average 100 in Test cricket, but Hollies bowled him second ball for a duck with a googly. Hassett came in at 117/2 and Australia closed at 153/2. Morris was unbeaten on 77.

On the second morning, Hassett and Morris took the score to 226 before their 109-run stand ended with Hassett's fall for 37. The following four batsmen were unable to establish themselves at the crease and none passed 20. Morris was finally removed for 196, ending an innings noted for his hooking and off-driving; it took a run out to remove Morris. Australia were eventually out for 389. Morris had scored more than half the runs as the rest of the team struggled against the leg spin of Hollies, who took 5/131. England had relied heavily on spin; two-thirds of the overs were delivered by the two spinners.

England started their second innings 337 runs in arrears. Lindwall made the early breakthrough, and Edrich joined Hutton and the pair consolidated the innings to close at the end of the second day on 54/1.

Early on the third day, Lindwall bowled Edrich for 28, before Compton and Hutton consolidated the innings with a partnership of 61 in 110 minutes. On 39, Compton fell to a reflex catch by Lindwall. Hutton managed to continue resisting before edging Miller to Tallon for 64, having top-scored in both innings, to leave England at 153/4. Thereafter, England collapsed in the fading light, prompting the umpires to call off play. The ground was then hit by rain, resulting in a premature end to the day's play. England had lost four wickets for 25 runs to end at 178/7.

England resumed on the fourth morning and Johnston quickly removed the last three wickets to seal an Australian victory by an innings and 149 runs. Johnston ended with 4/40 and Lindwall 3/50. This result sealed the series 4–0 in favour of Australia. The match was followed by a series of congratulatory speeches.

== Other matches in Great Britain ==
=== v Worcestershire ===
At Worcester, 28, 29, 30 April. Worcestershire (233 and 212) lost to the Australians (462/8 declared) by an innings and 17 runs.

The pitch was slow, and the weather was cold and showery for the traditional tour opener against Worcestershire. Worcester attracted a record attendance of 32,000 with takings of more than £4000. The hosts elected to bat, and started strongly as a century second-wicket stand took them to 137/1 after 133 minutes. However, the dismissal of Charles Palmer, who top-scored with 85, precipitated a collapse and they lost their last nine wickets in two hours to be all out for 233. Five Australian bowlers shared the wickets, with Johnson taking 3/52. In their sole innings, Australia took the initiative from the outset through a 166-run second-wicket stand between Morris (138) and Bradman (107). This took them to 265/1, before they declared at 462/8 after Miller had hit an unbeaten 50 in faster than even time. Off spinner Peter Jackson took 6/135 for the locals. In their second innings Worcestershire were bowled out by Australia for 212 runs, with 70 minutes to spare. McCool took 4/29 as the spinners took eight of the wickets.

=== v Leicestershire ===
At Leicester, 1, 3, 4 May. The Australians (448) defeated Leicestershire (130 and 147) by an innings and 171 runs.

Australia elected to bat, and Miller, who had been promoted to No. 3, shared century partnerships with Barnes (78) and Bradman (81). A middle-order collapse then ensued as the remaining Australians struggled against the local spin attack, but last man Johnston managed to hold up his end in a 37-run last-wicket partnership that allowed Miller to reach his double century. He ended on 202 not out as Australia were dismissed for 448. The Australian-born slow bowler Vic Jackson was the best Leicestershire bowler, taking 5/91. Leicestershire scored only 130 in their first innings; another Australian expatriate, Jack Walsh, top-scored with 33. Ring took 5/34 and the hosts hampered their batting efforts with two run outs. Australia enforced the follow on and Leicestershire faced the prospect of being bowled out twice in a day after Johnson took the first wickets to have them 5/83. After a rain delay Australia took the final five wickets for 34 runs in an hour on the final day; Leicestershire were all out for 147 in an innings defeat. Johnson ended with 7/42.

=== v Yorkshire ===
At Bradford, 5, 6 May. Yorkshire (71 and 89) lost to the Australians (101 and 63/6) by four wickets.

This low-scoring game was the closest that Australia came to defeat on the tour. The game was played in cold, blustery, overcast and wet conditions that suited spin bowlers. Yorkshire made only 71 in their first innings. Miller mixed medium-paced off-breaks with his fast bowling and this combination returned him 6/42. At the other end Johnston bowled his left arm orthodox spin and took 4/22 from 26 overs. Together the pair bowled almost unchanged, delivering 49.3 of 54.3 overs. Australia struggled in reply and stumps were called when they fell to 4/38.

Miller came in at the start of the second day's play and scored 34 of the next 48 runs added, before falling at 7/86, part of a collapse of 5/27. He hit two sixes in his innings, including one from the first ball that he faced, feeling that a defensive strategy would be almost impossible in the difficult conditions. Australia ended at 101, and Loxton was unable to bat due to injury. Frank Smailes had the best bowling figures for Yorkshire, 6/51. Yorkshire scored 89 in their second innings, which followed a similar pattern to their first effort. Wickets fell steadily as Johnston (6/18) and Miller (3/49) bowled 31.2 of the 36.2 overs.

Australia were set a target of 60 runs for victory, and Hassett elected to not have the pitch rolled. Former Australian Test batsman Jack Fingleton said that Hassett "might have made an initial mistake in not having the pitch rolled because whenever there was rain about in England the heavy roller seemed to knock any nonsense [erratic bounce and sideways movement] out of the pitch". Hassett and Hamence both fell with the score on 20 to leave Australia five down. Australia slumped to 6/31, effectively seven down with Loxton incapacitated by injury, but scraped home without further loss with Harvey and Tallon at the crease. Harvey was given two chances, once when he was on one, and Tallon was also missed. It would have been their first defeat against an English county since 1912, but Harvey won the game with a straight drive over the fence. Wickets had fallen at less than 10 runs apiece, and at the rate of every four overs.

=== v Surrey ===
At The Oval, 8, 10, 11 May. The Australians (632) defeated Surrey (141 and 195) by an innings and 296 runs.

Australia won the toss and Barnes and Morris put on 136 for the opening stand before the latter fell for 65. Barnes and Bradman then added 207 for the second wicket. Barnes' 176 came in 255 minutes and Bradman made 146 in 165 minutes. After Bradman departed at 403/3, wickets began to fall more regularly, but Hassett held up his end and made 110, while Tallon remained unbeaten on 50. Surrey's Test paceman Alec Bedser took 4/104. On the second afternoon, Surrey scored 141 runs in three hours in their first innings. Johnson took 5/53 and Laurie Fishlock carried his bat for 81 not out, but received little support, the next highest scores being 15 and 10. Australia enforced the follow on and took two early wickets before stumps on the second day. They made continual inroads on the final day, and Surrey were all out for 195 to complete an innings win. Johnston took 4/40 and Johnson 3/40.

=== v Cambridge University ===
At Fenner's, Cambridge, 12, 13, 14 May. Cambridge University (167 and 196) lost to the Australians (414/4 declared) by an innings and 51 runs.

Cambridge elected to bat and wickets fell regularly. No player made over 33 and the hosts were out in the second session of the first day for 167. Miller was prominent with the ball and in the field, taking 5/46 and two catches for his fellow bowlers. In reply, Australia were already 184/1 at stumps, with Brown heading for a consecutive century. He put on 176 for the second wicket with Hamence, who made 92. Brown reached 200 and was out immediately thereafter, prompting stand-in skipper Hassett to declare midway through the second day at 414/4, having reached 61 not out himself. In their second innings Cambridge failed to cope with the leg-spin of McCool, who took 7/78 as the match ended early on the third morning. Attendance over the three days was nearly 25,000.

=== v Essex ===
At Southend, 15, 17 May. The Australians (721) defeated Essex (83 and 187) by an innings and 451 runs.

After electing to bat, Australia made history on the first day by breaking the record for the most runs scored in a first-class match in a day. With centuries from Brown (153), Bradman (187), Loxton (120) and Saggers (104*), Australia's first innings totalled 721; they were dismissed on the close of the first day's play. Bradman's 187 came in 155 minutes and Brown's 153 lasted three hours; the pair put on 219 in 90 minutes after Barnes fell for 79 at 145/1. Bradman came in and seized the initiative, reaching 42 in the 20 minutes before lunch, including five fours from one over by Frank Vigar which subsequently entered Essex club folklore. Bradman and Brown were parted when the latter fell at 364/2 only halfway through the day's play. Miller then famously deliberately allowed himself to be bowled first ball as a protest against Australia's merciless crushing of their hosts, something that angered his captain and batting partner Bradman. Miller later told Dickie Bird that he had wanted to go to the local horse races, but this was refused by Bradman. The all rounder therefore made his duck in protest, but still did not get to go to the races. Later, Loxton and Saggers made 166 in 65 minutes for the sixth wicket, before a late-order collapse saw Australia lose 5/57, leaving Saggers unbeaten, but not before he reached the only first-class century of his career. After being demoralised by the Australian batsmen on the first day, Essex made only 83 in their first innings, capitulating within 37 overs. Toshack took 5/31 and Miller 3/14, and Australia enforced the follow-on. Essex's second innings appeared to be heading the same way when four early wickets to Johnson had them at 46/6. However, a partnership of 133 between Tom Pearce and Peter Smith for the seventh wicket salvaged some respectability before they were out for 187. Johnson ended with 6/37 as the Australians dismissed their hosts twice in a single day. The ground attendance of 32,000 was a record.

=== v Oxford University ===
At Oxford, 19, 20, 21 May. The Australians (431) defeated Oxford University (185 and 156) by an innings and 90 runs.

Australia batted first after Hassett won the toss, and the opening pair of Brown and Morris put on 139. Brown scored his third century in succession, before being out lbw to Indian Test player Abdul Hafeez Kardar for 108. Morris, Loxton, McCool and Ring all reached 50 as the Australians posted 431. Oxford's best batting performance came in the form of a 75-run partnership between Geoffrey Keighley and Kardar in their first innings, resisting the spin bowlers on the dry wicket. Despite Kardar's innings of 54 and 29, the top-score in both innings, Australia won by an innings and 90 runs as wickets fell steadily. The wickets were spread evenly among the tourists; Toshack took three in each innings, while Johnston and McCool totalled four for the match.

=== v Marylebone Cricket Club ===
At Lord's, 22, 24, 25 May. The Australians (552) defeated Marylebone Cricket Club (MCC) (189 and 205) by an innings and 158 runs.

The MCC fielded seven players who would represent England in the Tests, and with two other capped players, were basically a full strength Test team, as were Australia, who fielded their first-choice team. Barring one change in the bowling department, the same team lined up for Australia in the First Test, with the top six batsmen in the same position. It was a chance to gain a psychological advantage. After winning the toss, Australia batted first. After the loss of Morris early, Barnes (81) and Bradman (98) set about regaining the ascendancy with a 160-run stand. Bradman scored eleven fours in his 98, which took two hours, and Hassett then took over and added 51. Miller then saw Australia to stumps at 407/5. He continued the next day and Australia's highest scorer with 163, and Johnson supported him with 80. Despite a collapse which saw the last five wickets fall for 54 runs following the pair's departure, Australia reached 552. Bradman's batsmen gained a psychological advantage ahead of the Tests by attacking the off spin of Jim Laker. They hit nine sixes from the English Test representative on the second morning.

Miller and Lindwall then sought to gain an advantage over England's leading batsmen—Hutton and Compton—before the Tests. The MCC team, composed almost entirely of Test players, reached 91/2, Toshack removed Compton and Hutton in quick succession to reduce the hosts to 104/5. He took three more wickets to end with 6/51 as the MCC were eventually dismissed for 189, conceding a first innings lead of 363 runs. Some English observers decried Toshack's leg stump attack as being negative, but former Australian Test batsman Jack Fingleton said that Toshack's line was close enough to leg stump that most balls had to be played. Bradman opted to enforce the follow on, and his spinners did most of the damage, McCool taking 4/35 and Johnson 3/37. Only Len Hutton of the locals batsmen passed 26 during the match, scoring 52 and 64, and Australia had taken a key psychological victory ahead of the Tests with an innings victory. The total attendance was 60,000.

=== v Lancashire ===
At Manchester, 26, 27, 28 May. The Australians (204 and 259/4) drew with Lancashire (182).

The first day was abandoned due to rain. Australia lost the toss and were sent in to bat on a drying pitch. The 19-year-old Lancashire spin bowler Malcolm Hilton took Bradman's wicket twice in the match, causing a media sensation. Hilton bowled Bradman with an arm ball for 11, the Australian captain's first score on tour below 80. The Australian batsmen failed to capitalise on their starts as six were dismissed between 20 and 40. Australia looked set to concede a lead for the first time on tour as the hosts reached 3/129, but Johnston (5/49) took five of the last seven wickets for 28 runs in Lancashire's only innings, which ended on the third morning. With a result impossible, Australia had time for batting practice. Bradman reached 43, and when Hilton came on, the Australian captain, perhaps perturbed by earlier events, attempted to hit the spinner out of the attack. After missing the first two balls, Bradman charged the third, swung and missed, fell over and was stumped. Harvey (76*) and Hamence (49*) shared an unbeaten fifth-wicket partnership of 122 after Loxton made 52.

=== v Nottinghamshire ===
At Nottingham, 29, 31 May 1 June. Nottinghamshire (179 and 299/8) drew with the Australians (400).

In Nottinghamshire's first innings, Ray Lindwall took 6/14 from 15.1 overs, with only 10 scoring strokes being made off him. Reg Simpson made 74 and Joe Hardstaff junior 48, but only one other batsman reached double figures. After their 98-run third-wicket stand was broken, Australia took 8/68 to bowl the hosts out for 179. Lindwall, conceded less than a run per over. Only ten of his balls were scored from and not a single run was taken from his last 30 balls. Fingleton said that Lindwall "absolutely paralysed" the batsmen, with some of his bowling "in the real Larwood manner". Australia only batted once, and Brown top-scored with 122 in 3 hours 45 minutes, while Bradman added 86. The Australia middle-order fell away and the tourists lost their last six wickets for 74 runs. In the county's second innings, Keeton was hit in the chest by one of Lindwall's deliveries and took no further part in the match. On the final day, Hardstaff hit the first century against the Australians on the tour, 107, and Simpson again batted well, making 70. Lindwall and the Australian pacemen were less incisive in the second innings, and Ring and Johnson took four and three wickets respectively.

=== v Hampshire ===
At Southampton, 2, 3, 4 June. Hampshire (195 and 103) lost to the Australians (117 and 182/2) by eight wickets.

Hampshire won the toss and elected to bat against the Australians, who were led by Hassett while Bradman rested. The Australians were behind on the first innings for the first time on the tour and the match remained in the balance until the third afternoon. On a drying pitch, the hosts reached 116/3 before losing their remaining wickets for 79 to be all out for 195, while Johnston took 6/74. In reply, Australia fared worse and collapsed from 2/70 and made only 117. Charles Knott's off spin proved challenging for the Australians, but Miller scored three successive sixes from him before the collapse, top-scoring with 39. In their second innings, both Miller and Johnston took five Hampshire wickets. John Arnold top-scored for the hosts in both innings, with 48 and 42. Australia needed 182 runs in 175 minutes to win. Barnes went for a duck but Johnson, sent in five minutes before lunch, hit 74 out of a second-wicket partnership of 105, including three sixes and seven fours. Brown, with 81 not out, and Hassett saw the Australians through to victory.

=== v Sussex ===
At Hove, 5, 7 June. Sussex (86 and 138) lost to the Australians (549/5 declared) by an innings and 325 runs.

Lindwall won the match for the Australians with his bowling, taking 11/59. After winning the toss, the Sussex batsmen struggled with his length and variation of pace, and he hit the off-stump five times in the first innings alone to end with 6/34. Loxton also bowled well in the first innings, taking 3/13. Australia replied to Sussex's 86 strongly, and were already 254/1 by the end of the first day. Powered by Morris's 184 and with centuries too for Bradman (109) and Harvey (100*), Australia added a further 295 runs on the second day to declare at 549/5. They then still had time to send down 63.3 overs, enough to finish the match within two days. In Sussex's second innings Lindwall took two wickets in the first over. Harry Parks made 61, but Sussex were all out for 138, losing their last seven wickets for 59. In all, eight of Lindwall's wickets were bowled, five these by swinging yorkers, the batsmen unable to counter the swerving deliveries. Fingleton said that "Lindwall bundled the stumps over in all directions" as Sussex "crumpled completely ... in as depressing a batting performance as the tour knew". At the other end, Toshack helped to pin down the batsmen for Lindwall. He delivered 17 overs that yielded only three scoring shots for a total of six runs.

=== v Northamptonshire ===
At Northampton, 16, 17, 18 June. Northamptonshire (119 and 169) lost to the Australians (352/8 declared) by an innings and 64 runs.

Starting the day after the First Test, the Northamptonshire match was interrupted by rain. Northamptonshire batted first and collapsed to 7/61 before some tail-end resistance took them to 119; Johnston and Johnson took three wickets each. The Australians passed the locals' score on the first afternoon, and their innings was built around Hassett's 127, which included 17 fours. Morris and McCool also made fifties. Northamptonshire made 169 runs in their second innings, Johnston and Ring taking four wickets each. In neither of the county innings did any player reach 50.

=== v Yorkshire ===
At Sheffield, 19, 21, 22 June. The Australians (249 and 285/5 declared) drew with Yorkshire (206 and 85/4).

The Australians were made to work hard for their 249, with only Bradman reaching 50. Harvey and Hamence passed 40 but could not convert their starts into large scores. Alec Coxon took 4/66 for the hosts and was selected for the Second Test. Yorkshire made 206 in reply, Toshack taking 7/81 and Johnston 3/101: together, they bowled 81.1 of the 90.1 overs in the innings. Like the Australians, the local batsmen struggled to make the most of their starts; eight batsmen reached double figures but none passed 40. Not wanting to tire his bowlers ahead of the Second Test, Bradman declared Australia's second innings with a lead of 328 runs and only seventy minutes of play remaining. Brown hit 113 and Bradman himself 86, putting on 154 for the second wicket. Yardley expressed his displeasure by bowling his part-timers and then promoting tailenders to the upper half of the order in the second innings. The Australians batted in leisurely fashion with no urgency to force a result. Bradman then allowed his second-string bowlers to deliver 24 of the 27 overs as the match petered into a draw. The Australians were booed from the field by the spectators.

=== v Surrey ===
At The Oval, 30 June, 1–2 July. Surrey (221 and 289) lost to The Australians (389 and 122/0) by 10 wickets.

Australia won the toss and sent Surrey in to bat. They made 221, and Jack Parker top-scored with 76 in an uneven effort in which there were six single-figure scores. As the match started the day after the Second Test, Bradman let most of his second-string bowlers do the work to rest his first-choice bowlers, and Ring took three wickets, while the Test players only took two in total. Hamence opened the batting for Australia—Brown injured a finger while fielding—but he was out for a duck. Hassett (139) and Bradman (128) then put on 231, Bradman making his sixth century of the tour. However, the Australians lost wickets steadily thereafter to be all out for 389. Surrey made 289 in their second innings, with McCool taking 6/113 after bowling more than 40% of the overs. The hosts batted steadily with three fifties, but wickets fell regularly and only one partnership greater than 40 materialised. The tourists wanted to finish the run-chase quickly so they could watch fellow Australian John Bromwich play in the Wimbledon tennis final. Harvey and Loxton volunteered and chased down the 122 runs needed for victory in just 58 minutes to complete a 10-wicket win in just 20.1 overs. Harvey ended unbeaten on 73 and the Australians arrived at Wimbledon in time.

=== v Gloucestershire ===
At Bristol, 3, 5, 6 July. The Australians (774/7 declared) defeated Gloucestershire (279 and 132) by an innings and 363 runs.

The Australians elected to bat and made the highest score of the tour, and it was also the second biggest score by an Australian team in England (the 1893 team made 843 against a "Oxford and Cambridge Universities Past and Present" at Portsmouth), and the highest score by an Australian team versus an English county. Morris's 290, made from 466 balls in five hours, was the highest individual score of the tour, and he featured in century stands with Barnes, Miller and Harvey. Loxton made 159 not out, Harvey 95 and McCool 76. This match preceded the Third Test, and off spinner Tom Goddard was regarded as a candidate for England selection after strong performances in county cricket. However, Morris and Loxton's aggressive attack gave Goddard figures of 0/186 from 32 overs, effectively ending his chances of selection. Former English Test paceman Maurice Tate said "Tom [Goddard] is not used to batsmen using their feet to him ... the county batsmen diddle and diddle [shuffle about indecisively instead of quickly moving into position and attacking] to him and that gets him many wickets." Instead, it was Loxton who forced his way into the Third Test.

Gloucestershire replied with an innings of 279, in which Jack Crapp made 100 not out, while Johnson took 6/68. Made to follow on during the final day, the hosts made only 132, losing their last eight wickets for 60. Johnson took 5/32 to end with 11/100 for the match, while Ring took 5/47 to end with seven for the match. Australia's spinners took 19 wickets.

=== v Middlesex ===
At Lord's, 17, 19, 20 July. Middlesex (203 and 135) lost to the Australians (317 and 22/0) by ten wickets.

Denis Compton hit a cautious 62, but Middlesex lost wickets regularly to fall from 1/78 to 203 all out. Five bowlers shared the wickets, Johnston and Loxton taking three apiece. At one stage, Australia were 53/3, but Morris (109) and Loxton (123) put on a partnership of 172. No other batsman bettered Hamence's 30, and Jim Sims took 6/65 as the Australians collapsed and lost their last six wickets for 46. Middlesex scored 135 in their second innings, with only John Dewes (51) and Leslie Compton resisting the tourists, while eight managed only single figures. Five bowlers shared the wickets, and McCool was the only one to take three. McCool and Ring made the 22 required for victory in four overs.

=== v Derbyshire ===
At Derby, 28, 29, 30 July. The Australians (456) defeated Derbyshire (240 and 182) by an innings and 34 runs.

The Australians chose to bat first, and Brown top scored with 140, his first 50 taking three hours. He shared century stands with Bradman, who made 62, and Miller (57). Loxton later made 51 as the Australians fell away late in the innings, losing 7/142. Derbyshire made 240 in their first innings with the future Test umpire Charlie Elliott top-scoring with 57, while Miller, Johnston and Ring taking three wicket apiece. The county followed on 216 behind after losing their last six wickets for 64 runs. In their second innings they made 182, with Denis Smith making 88, the highest individual score ever made by a Derbyshire player against the Australians. However, only one other player reached double figures, as McCool precipitated a collapse of 9/72, taking 6/77, while Loxton took 3/16. There was a Derbyshire record attendance of 17,000 on the first day.

=== v Glamorgan ===
At Swansea, 31 July, 2–3 August. Glamorgan (197) drew with the Australians (215/3).

Rain prevented play after 3pm on the second day. No one scored more than 40 as Glamorgan elected to bat and made 197, with the four Australian bowlers, Lindwall, Miller, Johnson and Ring sharing the wickets. The Australians' 215/3 was based on an aggressive 84 from Miller, with five sixes and seven fours, and a partnership of 126 with stand-in Hassett, who was 71 not out when the rain came. The attendance on the two days of play totalled 50,000.

=== v Warwickshire ===
At Birmingham, 4, 5, 6 August. Warwickshire (138 and 155) lost to the Australians (254 and 41/1) by nine wickets.

Bradman put Warwickshire in to bat on a wet pitch and the hosts struggled to 138 in an innings that lasted almost 80 overs. Martin Donnelly (28) was the only batsman to pass 20, and Lindwall and Johnson took three wickets each. Australia scored 254 in reply; Hassett top-scored with 68, Lindwall made 45, and the pair's partnership of 70 was the highest of the match. Three other batsmen reached 30, but most of the Australians were uncomfortable against the leg spin of Eric Hollies, who opened the bowling and took 8/107, the best innings analysis against the Australians on the whole tour. This performance earned the Warwickshire bowler a call-up for the fifth and final Test. In their second innings Warwickshire made 155 runs, Johnston and McCool taking four wickets each, the former conceding only 32 from 39 overs. Australia made the required 41 by lunch on the third day.

=== v Lancashire ===
At Old Trafford, Manchester, 7, 9, 10 August. The Australians (321 and 265/3 declared) drew with Lancashire (130 and 199/7).

Cyril Washbrook's benefit match brought him a then record sum, £14,000, but it was a mixed experience because he injured his right thumb whilst facing Lindwall and withdrew from the England team for the Fifth Test. The Australians scored 321 in their first innings with only Barnes (67) reaching 50. Nine of the Australians made a start, reaching 14, but could not capitalise on their opportunities, and they lost wickets at regular intervals after an opening stand of 123. The slow left-arm bowler William Roberts took 6/73. Lancashire replied with 130 of which Washbrook made 38, while Lindwall and Johnson took three wickets apiece, but the Australians did not enforce the follow on. Australia made 265/5 declared and Bradman scored an unbeaten 133, his highest at Old Trafford, with 90 for Barnes. Bradman declared at lunch on the third day after batting the hosts out of the match, but they held on with three wickets in hand after losing two late in the day. Ikin had reached 99 after being repeatedly hit by bouncers. Bradman took the second new ball and gave it to Miller, who refused to bowl, saying that he felt Ikin deserved a century. Lindwall (4/27) was then given the ball and promptly removed Ikin one run short of his century.

=== v Durham ===
At Sunderland, 11, 12 August. The Australians (282) drew with Durham (73/5).

In the absence of the resting Bradman, Hassett won the toss and elected to bat. Attendance was 17,000 on the first day of this two-day non-first-class match. Rain prevented any play on the second day. After a poor start that saw them fall to 22/3, McCool (64) and Miller (55) made half-centuries for the Australians. Many of the Australians made starts and six scores passed 20, but none went on. Paceman Keith Jackson took 5/76 for the hosts. Five Australian bowlers each took one wicket and Jackson top-scored with 23 before rain ended the match.

=== v Kent ===
At Canterbury, 21, 23 August. The Australians (361) defeated Kent (51 and 124) by an innings and 186 runs.

Australia elected to bat first and Brown made 106, while Bradman (65) and Harvey (60) both scored half-centuries. Kent collapsed to the lowest score of the tour in the first innings, succumbing in only 23 overs. Johnston and Loxton both took 3/10, and six local batsmen made ducks. Forced to follow on, half the Kent team were out for 45 in the second innings. Tony Pawson and Godfrey Evans added 71, but the match, held in front of record crowds for the ground, ended inside two days, soon after Evans was run out. It took the Australians less than 56 overs to get 20 wickets. Lindwall took 4/37 in the second innings; all his wickets were top-order batsmen.

=== v Gentlemen of England ===
At Lord's, 25, 26, 27 August. The Australians (610/5 declared) defeated the Gentlemen of England (245 and 284) by an innings and 81 runs.

In his last match at Lord's, Bradman won the toss and made his ninth century (150) of the tour against a team composed almost entirely of Test players. Brown (120) and Hassett (200*) also scored centuries, and Miller made 69. Bradman elected to bat into the second day. The Gentlemen responded with 242 of which Reg Simpson made 60 and, following on, 284, with Bill Edrich making 128. There were no other scores beyond 30 in either innings. Ring took 5/70 for the innings and eight for the match, while Johnson secured seven wickets. The Victorian spin duo bowled the majority of the overs in both innings.

=== v Somerset ===
At Taunton, 28, 30 August. The Australians (560/5 declared) defeated Somerset (115 and 71) by an innings and 374 runs.

After winning the toss, the Australians made all their runs on the first day, with centuries for Hassett (103), Harvey (126) and Johnson (113*) and 99 for Hamence. The Australians put on 255 for the second wicket, through Hassett and Barnes, who was replaced by Harvey after retiring ill. The other Australian batsmen had all made centuries, and were keen to see Hamence do the same. The rest of the team left their card games in readiness to applaud his impending milestone, only to see him stumped for 99, his highest score for the season. On the Monday, the second day, on a pitch that was taking spin, Somerset collapsed twice inside four hours and less than 82 overs in total. McCool took 4/21 and 4/23, and Johnston also took eight, including 5/34 in the second innings. He took the last two wickets of the Somerset first innings as a spinner, and then had Harold Gimblett lbw with the second ball of the second innings as a fast-medium bowler to take three wickets in four balls.

=== v South of England ===
At Hastings, 1, 2, 3 September. The Australians (522/7 declared) drew with the South of England (298).

The tourists elected to bat and after losing the openers early, Hassett top scored with 151, his third consecutive century. He was supported by Bradman (143) and Harvey (110), whose quick scoring enabled the Australians to declare with a large total. Hassett shared partnerships in excess of 150 with both Bradman and Harvey. Harvey's century took only 90 minutes and Loxton hit 67 in 75 minutes on the second day. The second and third days were continually interrupted by rain, and Compton made 82 in the showers. Bradman gave his regular bowlers a light workload and Brown took 4/16 in 4.1 overs to finish off the tail, the only time he bowled in first-class matches on the entire tour. There was no time left for the second innings.

=== v HDG Leveson-Gower's XI ===
At Scarborough, 8, 9, 10 September. HDG Leveson-Gower's XI (177 and 75/2) drew with the Australians (489/8 declared).

This was the final match for Bradman in England, and the ground was crowded despite rain interruptions. It was Australia's biggest challenge in the post-Test tour matches. During the last Australian campaign in 1938, this team was effectively a full-strength England outfit, but this time Bradman insisted that only six current England Test players be allowed to play. Bradman then fielded a full-strength team, with the only difference from the Fifth Test line-up being the inclusion of Johnson at the expense of Ring. The host captain Walter Robins won the toss and decided to bat, but Lindwall took 6/59 in an innings that lasted into the second day, bowling four of his victims and taking five of the last six wickets to fall as the hosts lost their last six wickets for 57 runs. Bradman and Barnes made 153 and 151 respectively, sharing a second-wicket partnership of 225 after Morris was out for 62. Loxton hit a ball from Freddie Brown into his own face, breaking his nose. Australia reached 2/407 on the third and final afternoon before collapsing to 8/469 before Bradman declared without attempting to force a result. Leveson-Gower's XI played out time, with Bradman bowling the last over.

=== v Scotland ===
At Edinburgh, 13, 14 September. The Australians (236) defeated Scotland (85 and 111) by an innings and 40 runs.

The match against Scotland was a two-day fixture that did not have first-class status. Australia elected to bat and Morris top-scored with 112, and McCool made 52, but all struggled against the leg-spin of William Laidlaw, who took 5/51. The Australians collapsed at the end, losing their last six wickets for 36 runs, and only three made double figures. Scotland collapsed against Johnston and Johnson, who took 6/15 and 3/18 respectively. Forced to follow on, a second innings opening stand of 50 preceded a second collapse, this time Ring and Morris took 4/20 and 5/10. Only three Scottish players passed double figures in either innings.

=== v Scotland ===
At Aberdeen, 17, 18 September. Scotland (178 and 142) lost to the Australians (407/6 declared) by an innings and 87 runs.

In another two-day non-first-class match, Scotland batted better than in Edinburgh after being sent in to bat, but still lost. Tom Crosskey top-scored with 49 in the hosts' 178, before Bradman top-scored with 123 in his last match in Britain and McCool, promoted to open, made 108, while Johnson made 95 after being promoted to No. 5. Scotland then made 142 in some light-hearted cricket in which wicketkeeper Tallon took two wickets and stand-in gloveman Johnson stumped a Scottish batsman off Ring. Bradman allowed his non-regular bowlers opportunities with the ball, and the wickets were shared, with nobody taking more than four.

== Notes on statistics and scoring conventions ==
n-[1] ^{a} This notation means that one wicket was lost while 79 runs were scored.
n-[2] ^{a} This statement can be verified by consulting all the scorecards for the matches, as listed here.

== See also ==
- 1948 English cricket season
- 1982 Kangaroo tour of Great Britain and France
