= William Jeanes =

Australian cricket administrator

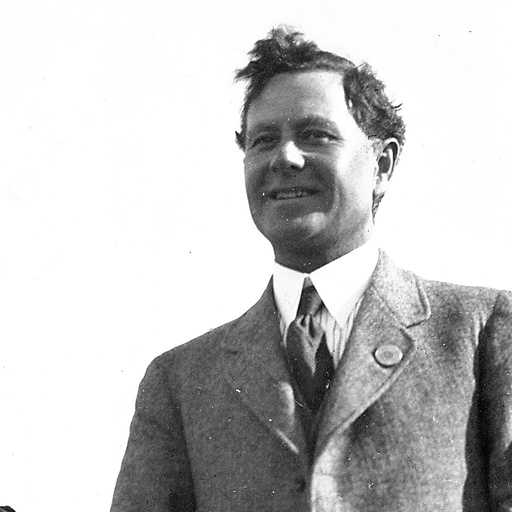
William Henry Jeanes in 1921, at the presentation of guns to the City of Glenelg.

William Henry Jeanes OBE (1883-1 September 1958) was an Australian cricket administrator who held the position of secretary for the Australian Board of Control from 1927 to 1954. He is the longest-serving secretary of the board and its successors, the Australian Cricket Board and Cricket Australia.

Jeanes was born in Nottinghamshire, emigrating to Adelaide, Australia with his parents at the age of three. He attended public schools before attending Whindham College and studying surveying at the School of Mines. He subsequently worked as a surveyor and Clerk for the City of Woodville until 1913, when he took a position as the Clerk of the Glenelg Corporation. In this role he played a major role in the development of the Glenelg Waterfront. During the First World War he raised over 200,000 pounds for the war effort. Later in 1954 he would go on to compile a book "Glenelg : birthplace of South Australia" on behalf of the Glenelg council. He resigned from this position in 1924 work for private business.

In 1926, Jeanes was appointed as the Secretary of the South Australian Cricket Association. The following year he also took on the role of secretary of the Australian Board of Control. At this time Frank Coffey called Jeanes "thorough in all that he does, approachable at all times, a splendid organiser and courtesy personified". Notably, Jeanes served as the manager for the 1938 Australian tour of England, being the sole non-player on the tour. While on the tour he was awarded an Order of the British Empire for his services to cricket. Although given the chance to manage the 1948 "Invincibles" tour, he declined. Gideon Haigh, an Australian cricket historian, remarked that Jeanes had become increasingly "officious and liverish", leading to his waning popularity among players. Suffering from Ill health, Jeanes retired as secretary of both the board of control and Cricket Association in 1954. Jeanes died on 1 September 1958.
