= Dudley Seddon =

Australian sportsman

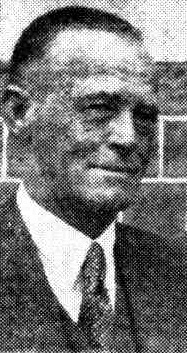

Personal information
- Full name: Cecil Dudley Seddon
- Born: 3 July 1902 Campbelltown, New South Wales, Australia
- Died: 18 April 1978 (aged 75) Dulwich Hill, New South Wales

Playing information
- Position: Wing
Club
Years	Team	Pld	T	G	FG	P
1920–26	Newtown	57	21	0	0	63
Representative
Years	Team	Pld	T	G	FG	P
1921–24	New South Wales	2	1	0	0	3
- Cricket career

Cricket information
- Batting: Right-handed
- Role: Batsman

Domestic team information
- Years: Team
- 1926/27–1928/29: New South Wales

Career statistics
Competition	First-class
Matches	6
Runs scored	361
Batting average	36.10
100s/50s	1/2
Top score	134
Catches/stumpings	0/0
- Source: CricketArchive, 7 December 2022

Cecil Dudley Seddon (3 July 1902 – 18 April 1978) was an Australian sportsman who represented New South Wales in both cricket and rugby league.

== Rugby league ==
Seddon played rugby league for the Newtown in the New South Wales Rugby League from 1920 to 1926. He was one of the New South Wales rugby league team's three-quarters in a representative match against Queensland on 5 June 1921.

== Cricket ==
Seddon made his first-class cricket debut in a 1926/27 Sheffield Shield match against Queensland. A middle order batsman, Seddon made just six and four.

He had to wait a year to make his next first-class appearance, which came against Tasmania in 1927/28. Seddon again didn't have an impact, making 10 and 22 in his two innings.

The right-hander made three appearances in New South Wales's winning 1928/29 Sheffield Shield campaign. His best performance came against Queensland at the Sydney Cricket Ground, where he made a pair of half centuries (80 and 59). Also that summer, Seddon played a first-class match against Tasmania in Hobart and scored a career best 134. It was his final first-class innings.

== National selector ==
Seddon was a selector for the Australia national cricket team from 1954 to 1967.
