= Laurie Sawle =

Australian cricketer (1925–2022)

Laurie Sawle AM
Personal information
- Full name: Lawrence Michael Sawle
- Born: 19 August 1925; East Fremantle, Western Australia
- Died: 26 July 2022 (aged 96); Perth, Western Australia
- Nickname: The Colonel
- Batting: Left-handed
- Role: Opening batsman

Domestic team information
- Years: Team
- 1954/55–1960/61: Western Australia

Career statistics
| Competition | First-class |
|---|---|
| Matches | 35 |
| Runs scored | 1,701 |
| Batting average | 28.83 |
| 100s/50s | 1/9 |
| Top score | 109* |
| Balls bowled | 19 |
| Wickets | 0 |
| Bowling average | – |
| 5 wickets in innings | – |
| 10 wickets in match | – |
| Best bowling | – |
| Catches/stumpings | 19/– |
- Source: ESPNcricinfo, 6 February 2018

Lawrence Michael Sawle (19 August 1925 – 26 July 2022) was an Australian first-class cricketer and administrator for the Australia national cricket team.

Sawle was born in East Fremantle, Western Australia, in August 1925. He served in the 7th Australian Infantry Battalion during the Second World War. He enlisted in January 1944 and served until July 1946. He saw action on Bougainville.

He played for Western Australia from 1954–55 to 1960–61 as a patient opening batsman. His highest score was 109 not out, when he led the successful struggle to save the Sheffield Shield match against New South Wales in 1955–56.

Sawle had a distinguished career as state selector from 1961–62 to 1979–80, then as a senior WACA administrator, director of the Australian Cricket Board and chairman of selectors for the national team from 1994 to 1997. In his state selector role, Sawle partnered with Allan Edwards and Wally Langdon during the Western Australian team's most successful years. He managed the Australian cricket team in England in 1989, when Australia regained The Ashes.

Sawle worked as a school teacher. He was awarded the AM in 1992 for service to cricket administration, and also received the Australian Sports Medal, the Centenary Medal and the ICC Volunteer Recognition Medal. He and his wife had three children. He died in Perth on 26 July 2022, at the age of 96.
