= Ted White (cricketer) =

Australian cricketer

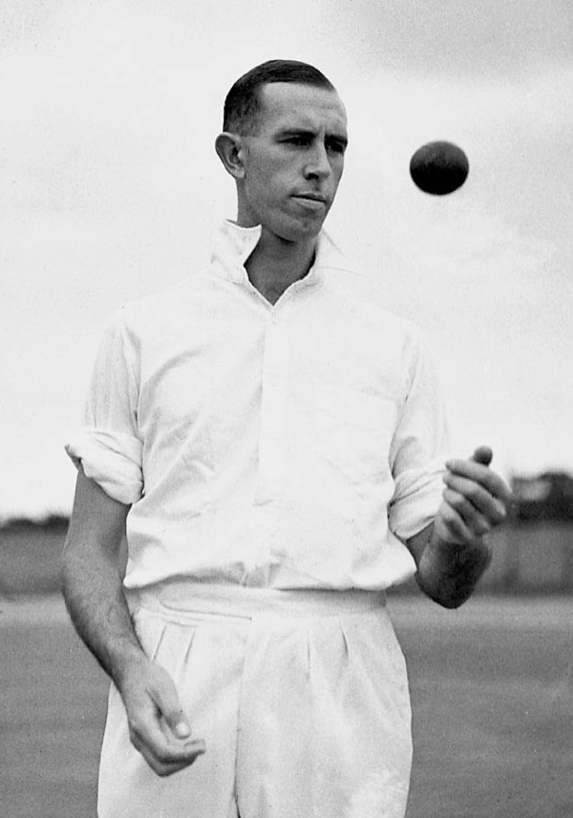
- White in 1938

Personal information
- Full name: Edward Clive Stewart White
- Born: 17 April 1913; Mosman, New South Wales, Australia
- Died: 10 October 1999 (aged 86); Hornsby, New South Wales, Australia
- Height: 1.88 m (6 ft 2 in)
- Batting: Right-handed
- Bowling: Left-arm medium
- Role: All-rounder

Domestic team information
- Years: Team
- 1934–1938: New South Wales

Career statistics
Competition	First-class
Matches	56
Runs scored	1,316
Batting average	22.30
100s/50s	1/5
Top score	108*
Balls bowled	10,788
Wickets	115
Bowling average	26.71
5 wickets in innings	2
10 wickets in match	0
Best bowling	8/31
Catches/stumpings	37/–
- Source: CricketArchive, 8 February 2008

Edward Clive Stewart White (17 April 1913 – 10 October 1999) was an Australian cricketer who played for New South Wales and toured England with the Australian team in 1938 without playing a Test match.

Born and raised in Sydney, Ted White played grade cricket with the North Sydney club and scored 52 on his first-class debut against Victoria in 1934–35. White bowled with a fluent, upright action that maximised his height and he relied on accuracy and changes of pace rather than movement to secure wickets. Against South Australia in 1935–36, he captured 8/31 on a receptive pitch at the Sydney Cricket Ground, which included a spell of four wickets for no runs. The next season, he hit his only first-class century, batting at number ten. Chosen to tour England in 1938 with the Australian team led by Don Bradman, he was not suited to the batting-friendly pitches that resulted from a summer of dry weather and he claimed only 30 wickets (at 23.60 average). His performances were hampered by chronic back problems, which forced his retirement during the 1938–39 Australian season.

White's father Alfred (1879–1962) played four matches for New South Wales, including one as captain, between 1905–06 and 1908–09; the Whites were the first father-son combination to each score a first-class century for the state. Ted White worked in the family's sharebroking business before enlisting in the Australian army during World War II. He served in the Middle East and New Guinea, rising from the rank of private to major by the war's end. After the war, he played suburban cricket for two decades, capturing 823 wickets for the I Zingari team.
