= Bill Tallon =

Australian cricketer

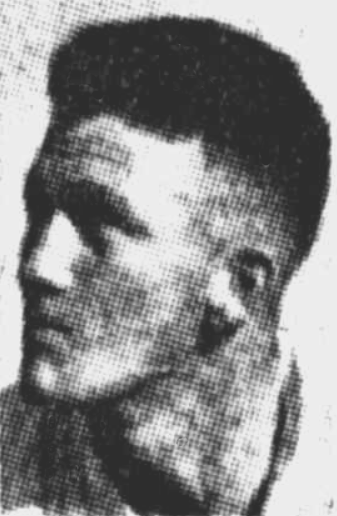

Personal information
- Born: 9 July 1914; Bundaberg, Queensland, Australia
- Died: 18 September 1972 (aged 58); Coopers Plains, Queensland, Australia
- Source: Cricinfo, 8 October 2020

Bill Tallon (9 July 1914 – 18 September 1972) was an Australian cricketer. He played in nine first-class matches for Queensland between 1938 and 1940. He also played cricket for Bundaberg. He was the brother of Don Tallon.

== See also ==
- List of Queensland first-class cricketers
