= Thomas Carroll (cricketer) =

Australian cricketer

Personal information
- Born: 26 February 1884; Hobart, Tasmania, Australia
- Died: 3 June 1957 (aged 73); Hobart, Tasmania, Australia

Domestic team information
- Years: Team
- 1907-1922: Tasmania
- Source: Cricinfo, 19 January 2016

Thomas Carroll (26 February 1884 – 3 June 1957) was an Australian cricketer. He played eleven first-class matches for Tasmania between 1907 and 1922.

== See also ==
- List of Tasmanian representative cricketers
