= Wally Langdon =

Australian cricketer (1922–2004)

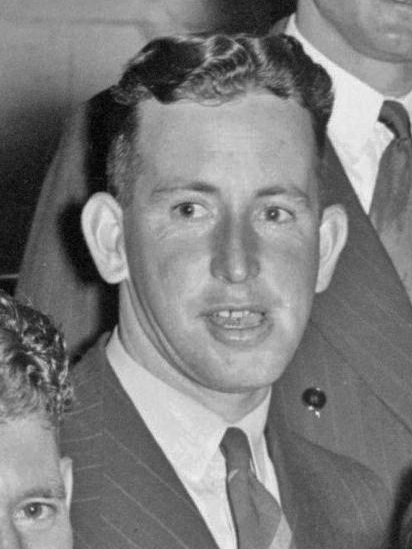
- Langdon in 1948

Personal information
- Full name: Christopher Walter Langdon
- Born: 4 July 1922 Boulder, Western Australia
- Died: 2 May 2004 (aged 81) Nedlands, Western Australia
- Years active: 1946–1947 (football); 1946–1956 (first-class cricket)

Sport
- Sport: Australian rules football, cricket
- Team: Claremont (football); Western Australia (cricket); Commonwealth XI (cricket)

Christopher Walter Langdon (4 July 1922 – 2 May 2004) was an Australian sportsman who played Australian rules football and cricket at high levels. He played two seasons of senior football for Claremont in the Western Australian National Football League (WANFL), and first-class cricket for Western Australia between 1946 and 1956.

Langdon was born in Boulder, Western Australia. After moving to Perth from the Eastern Goldfields, he played two seasons of senior WANFL football for Claremont, appearing in five games during the 1946 season and two during the 1947 season.

A left-handed middle-order batsman, Langdon made his first-class cricket debut for Western Australia in October 1946, playing against a touring English team. His Sheffield Shield debut came during the 1947–48 season, which was Western Australia's first in the competition. At the end of the season, he represented the state team against the Australian national team on its way to a tour of England, and scored a maiden first-class century, 112 runs. Langdon made his first Sheffield Shield century during the 1948–49 season, 138 against Queensland. He toured India, Pakistan, and Sri Lanka with a Commonwealth XI team during the 1949–50 season, and made fourteen first-class appearances on tour.

For the 1952–53 season, which turned out to be his last full season at first-class level, Langdon was appointed Western Australia's captain. He scored two centuries in six matches – 118 against Queensland and 120 not out against the touring South Africans. Langdon spent 1954 and 1955 in England, playing in the Lancashire League as a professional for Burnley. He returned to Western Australia for two final matches during the 1955–56 season. After finishing his playing career, Langdon remained involved in cricket as a coach and selector of the state team, as well as a commentator for ABC Radio.
