= William Crosskey =

American legal historian

- Born: William Winslow Crosskey; June 14, 1894; Chicago, Illinois, U.S.
- Died: January 6, 1968 (aged 73); New Haven, Connecticut, U.S.

Academic background
- Education: Yale University (BA, LLB)

Academic work
- Discipline: Law
- Sub-discipline: Constitutional law
- Institutions: University of Chicago School of Law

William Winslow Crosskey (June 14, 1894 – January 6, 1968) was an American legal historian who taught at the University of Chicago Law School from 1935 to 1962. He is primarily known for his three-volume series of books entitled Politics and the Constitution in the History of the United States, the first two volumes of which were published in 1953. The third volume was completed posthumously and published in 1980. In these books, Crosskey argued that the intention of the framers of the United States Constitution was to create a federal government with sufficient power to accomplish the goals laid out in the Preamble to the United States Constitution. This is in contrast to the conventional view that the framers intended to create a federal government with strict limitations on its powers. When the first two volumes of this series were published in 1953, they attracted considerable scholarly discussion, much of it harshly critical of Crosskey's arguments. Volume three, however, received far less scholarly attention when it was published in 1980.
