= Mervyn Waite =

Australian sportsman

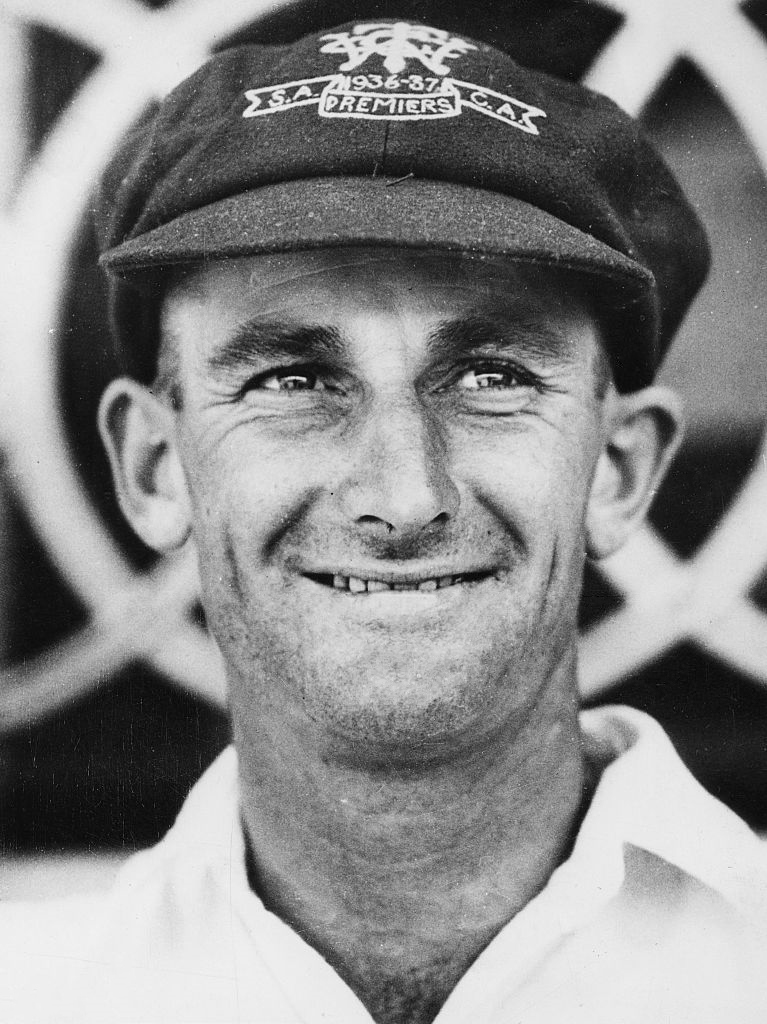
- Waite in 1938

Personal information
- Born: 7 January 1911; Kent Town, South Australia
- Died: 16 December 1985 (aged 74); Georgetown, South Australia
- Batting: Right-handed
- Bowling: Right-arm off-spin

International information
- National side: Australia
- Test debut (cap 162): 22 July 1938 v England
- Last Test: 20 August 1938 v England

Career statistics
Competition	Test	First-class
Matches	2	103
Runs scored	11	3,888
Batting average	3.66	27.77
100s/50s	0/0	1/23
Top score	8	137
Balls bowled	552	15,363
Wickets	1	192
Bowling average	190.00	31.61
5 wickets in innings	0	5
10 wickets in match	0	0
Best bowling	1/150	7/101
Catches/stumpings	1/–	66/–
- Source: Cricinfo, 14 October 2022

Mervyn George Waite (7 January 1911 – 16 December 1985) was an Australian cricketer who played in two Test matches during the 1938 Ashes Tour. During that tour he developed a reputation as something of a playboy, revealing in a 1985 interview that "Bradman got the runs, I got the roots". He played as an all-rounder for South Australia in the Sheffield Shield from 1930 to 1946.

Waite was also a leading Australian rules footballer in the South Australian National Football League (SANFL), first at West Torrens then Glenelg, the combined Glenelg/West Adelaide World War II side, and finally with South Adelaide. In total he played 142 league games, kicking 343 goals, and was the leading goalkicker at West Torrens in 1931, 1932 and 1934.

He set a record for the highest score in the Adelaide cricket competition in the 1935–36 final when he made 339 in 434 minutes out of West Torrens's total of 492.
