= Australian cricket team in England in 1938 =

International cricket tour

The five-Test 1938 Ashes series between Australia and England was drawn. England and Australia won a Test each, with two of the other Tests drawn and the third game of the series, scheduled for Manchester, abandoned without a ball being bowled, only the second instance of this in more than 60 years of Test cricket. The Australians retained The Ashes.

In all, 30 first-class matches were played, and the Australian team won 15 of them losing only to England and H. D. G. Leveson-Gower's XI. There were also six minor games, the Australians winning five of them.

== The touring team ==
- DG Bradman (captain - SA)
- SJ McCabe (vice-captain - NSW)
- CL Badcock (SA)
- SG Barnes (NSW)
- BA Barnett (VIC)
- WA Brown (QLD)
- AG Chipperfield (NSW)
- JHW Fingleton (NSW)
- LO Fleetwood-Smith (VIC)
- AL Hassett (VIC)
- EL McCormick (VIC)
- WJ O'Reilly (NSW)
- MG Waite (SA)
- CW Walker (SA)
- FA Ward (SA)
- ECS White (NSW)

Manager: WH Jeanes (SA)

The team travelled to England on the P&O liner RMS Strathmore.

== Test series summary ==
=== First Test ===
10, 11, 13, 14 June 1938
(4-day match)
Scorecard

England	v	Australia
658/8d (188 overs); E Paynter 216* (333); LO Fleetwood-Smith 4/153 (49 overs)		411 (130.3 overs); SJ McCabe 232 (277); K Farnes 4/106 (37 overs)
		427/6d (f/o) (188 overs); DG Bradman 144* (379); H Verity 3/102 (62 overs)

Match drawn
Trent Bridge, Nottingham
Umpires: F Chester and E Robinson

- England won the toss and elected to bat.
- 12 June was taken as a rest day.
- WJ Edrich, RA Sinfield and DVP Wright (all ENG), and AL Hassett and BA Barnett (both AUS) made their Test debuts.

=== Second Test ===
24, 25, 27, 28 June 1938
(4-day match)
Scorecard

England	v	Australia
494 (137.3 overs); WR Hammond 240 (394); WJ O'Reilly 4/93 (37 overs)		422 (121.4 overs); WA Brown 206* (370); H Verity 4/103 (35.4 overs)
242/8d (72 overs); DCS Compton 76* (137); EL McCormick 3/72 (24 overs)		204/6 (48.2 overs); DG Bradman 102* (135); WJ Edrich 2/27 (5.2 overs)

Match drawn
Lord's, London
Umpires: EJ Smith and FI Walden

- England won the toss and elected to bat.
- 26 June was taken as a rest day.

=== Third Test ===
8, 9, 11, 12 July 1938
(4-day match)
Scorecard

England	v	Australia

Match abandoned without a ball bowled
Old Trafford, Manchester
Umpires: A Dolphin and W Reeves

- No toss made.

=== Fourth Test ===
22, 23, 25 July 1938
(4-day match)
Scorecard

England	v	Australia
223 (98.1 overs); WR Hammond 76; WJ O'Reilly 5/66 (34.1 overs)		242 (98.4 overs); DG Bradman 103; K Farnes 4/77 (26 overs)
123 (50.5 overs); CJ Barnett 29; WJ O'Reilly 5/56 (21.5 overs)		107/5 (32.3 overs); AL Hassett 33; DVP Wright 3/26 (5 overs)

Australia won by 5 wickets
Headingley, Leeds
Umpires: F Chester and EJ Smith

- England won the toss and elected to bat.
- 24 July was taken as a rest day.
- The match was scheduled for four days but completed in three.
- WFF Price (ENG) and MG Waite (AUS) made their Test debuts.

=== Fifth Test ===
20, 22, 23, 24 August 1938
(Timeless Test)
Scorecard

England	v	Australia
903/7d (335.2 overs); L Hutton 364; WJ O'Reilly 3/178 (85 overs)		201 (52.1 overs); WA Brown 69; WE Bowes 5/49 (19 overs)
		123 (f/o) (34.1 overs); BA Barnett 46; K Farnes 4/63 (12.1 overs)

England won by an innings and 579 runs
The Oval, London
Umpires: F Chester and FI Walden

- England won the toss and elected to bat.
- 21 August was taken as a rest day.
- The match was completed in four days.
- A Wood (ENG) and SG Barnes (AUS) made their Test debuts.

The England total of 903/7d is the highest Test innings total to feature a duck – Eddie Paynter was dismissed for 0. The margin of an innings and 579 runs is the largest margin by an innings to date and the second by runs, beaten only by England's defeat of Australia by 675 runs in the first Test of the 1928–29 series.

== Ceylon ==
The Australians had a stopover in Colombo en route to England and played a one-day single-innings match there against the Ceylon national team, which at that time did not have Test status.

== Annual reviews ==
- Wisden Cricketers' Almanack 1939
