= Tom Crosskey =

Scottish footballer and cricketer

Thomas Roland Crosskey (4 July 1905 – 25 March 1971) was a Scottish cricketer and footballer. Though born in Hastings, Sussex, he played club cricket for Carlton, Edinburgh, Blyth, Ashington and Morpeth, as well as four first class matches for Scotland between 1949 and 1950. In football, he featured as a goalkeeper for Crystal Palace, Albion Rovers, Heart of Midlothian, Cowdenbeath, Raith Rovers, Morton and Montrose. In cricket, he was a right-hand batsman who made a best of 81 in his first-class career, but in a non-first class match against the Australian 1948 Invincibles he top-scored with 49 for Scotland. He died in Totnes, Devon.
