= Chappie Dwyer =

Australian cricketer and national selector

Personal information
- Full name: Edmund Alfred Dwyer
- Born: 19 October 1894; Mosman, Sydney, New South Wales
- Died: 10 October 1975 (aged 80); Mosman, Sydney, New South Wales
- Batting: Right-handed
- Role: Batsman

Domestic team information
- Years: Team
- 1918/19–1928/29: New South Wales
- FC debut: 26 December 1918 New South Wales v Victoria
- Last FC: 8 February 1929 New South Wales v Tasmania

Career statistics
Competition	First-class
Matches	3
Runs scored	65
Batting average	16.25
100s/50s	0/0
Top score	23*
Catches/stumpings	0/0
- Source: CricInfo, 28 February 2009

Edmund Alfred Dwyer (19 October 1894 – 10 September 1975), known as Chappie Dwyer, was an Australian cricketer and national selector. Dwyer was born in Mosman, Sydney and played for the New South Wales cricket team for three first-class cricket matches as a right-handed batsman.

== Career ==
Dwyer played his three matches for NSW sporadically between the end of the First World War and the year of the Wall Street crash. His first match took place on 26 December 1918 against Victoria at the Melbourne Cricket Ground. Winning the toss, NSW inserted Victoria in to bat, and dismissed them for 266, largely composed of a century by Frederick Baring. Dwyer, at number two, formed an opening partnership of 26 with Australian international Warren Bardsley before the latter fell lbw to Baring for 18 and Dwyer was dismissed by international Edgar McDonald. NSW fell to 123 all out, and were unable to stop Victoria from reaching 299 all out in their second innings, thanks to a century by Edgar Mayne. NSW notched up 226 in reply, Dwyer falling again to McDonald for nine.

Dwyer did not play again until 28 November 1925, against Queensland in Brisbane. Dwyer, now batting at number six, scored 20 runs before he was dismissed by Australian international Ron Oxenham, who went on to get a five-wicket-haul as NSW reached 287 all out. Oxenham then went on to score 96 as an opener in Queensland's reply total of 506, which also contained a century of 132 for Francis Thompson. Dwyer hit 23 not out as Queensland reached 77/4 before the three-day match ended as a draw.

Dwyer's last appearance in first-class cricket came on 8 February 1929, against Tasmania in Hobart. Winning the toss and with captain Charles Kelleway deciding to bat first, NSW reached 443 all out with Dwyer, now batting at number eight, being dismissed for two by Reginald Townley. NSW then quickly dismissed Tasmania for 158, with four wickets each for Ronald Eaton and Frank Jordan, who took a further two and four wickets respectively as Tasmania were dismissed for 102 in the follow-on to hand NSW victory by innings and 182 runs, the only victory Dwyer was to partake in.

Dwyer completed his three-match career with 65 runs at 16.25, and a highscore of 23* against Queensland in 1925. His son, Brian Eric Dwyer, who was born on 9 February 1925, would go on to play for New South Wales' Colts and Second XI across the winter of 1948/49, however neither ever represented Australia at- the international level.

Dwyer served as a selector for New South Wales from 1930 to 1954, and a national selector from 1930 to 1952. He managed the Australian team that toured South Africa in 1949–50. Jack Fingleton thought the combination of Dwyer and the captain, Lindsay Hassett, was the best an Australian touring team ever had.
