= List of alumni of Wesley College, Melbourne =

This is a list of notable Old Wesley Collegians, former students of Wesley College, Melbourne, Victoria, Australia.

Alumni of Wesley College are known as Old Collegians and are automatically members of the school's alumni association, the Old Wesley Collegians Association, which was founded in 1882.

== Academia, philosophy, religion and education ==
- Samuel Alexander OM, British philosopher and the first Jewish fellow of an Oxbridge College
- Waleed Aly, lecturer at Global Terrorism Research Centre, School of Political & Social Inquiry, and at the Monash University Faculty of Arts; spokesman for the Islamic Council of Victoria; presenter on Network Ten's The Project
- The Hon. Chief Justice Michael Black AC QC, Barrister, Chief Justice of the Federal Court of Australia, Foundation Chairman of the Victorian Bar’s Readers Course, chair of the Advisory Committee (Juris Doctor Degree at the Melbourne Law School)
- Professor Geoffrey Blainey AC, historian
- Dr Andrew Dent AC, associate professor of medicine (Melbourne University)
- Professor Brian Lewis, Dean of the Faculty of Architecture (University of Melbourne)
- Professor John Henry Michell, mathematician and Senior Wrangler (Cambridge University)
- Professor Graham Oppy, philosopher (Monash University)
- Joseph Lade Pawsey, pioneer of the study of radio astronomy in Australia
- Lawrence Pyke, Rhodes Scholar, Headmaster of Newington College
- Sir David Rivett KCMG, Rhodes Scholar and associate professor and professor of chemistry (University of Melbourne)
- Walter Rosenhain, metallurgist
- Professor Chris Silagy AO, leading pioneer in evidence-based medicine
- Andrew St. John, Assistant Bishop of Melbourne
- Professor Warren Thomson OAM, Music (University of Sydney)
- Sir Harold L. White CBE, Parliamentary Librarian of Australia and National Librarian
- Professor Carl Wood AC, CBE, FRCS, FRANZCOG; IVF pioneer (Monash University)

== Business and sports administration ==
- Sir Frank Beaurepaire, founder of Beaurepaires and Olympic Tyres
- Sir John Grice, director of National Australia Bank (first Wesley student to qualify for entrance to University of Melbourne)
- Daryl Jackson AM, architect; chairman of the Australian Film Institute; trustee of NGV; vice president of Melbourne Cricket Club
- Poppy King, businesswoman; Young Australian of the Year 1995 (also attended Lauriston Girls' School)
- Eric McCutchan, manager of the Victorian Football League; inducted into the AFL Hall of Fame in 1996
- Ross Oakley, chief executive officer of the Australian Football League, Victorian Rugby Union, Melbourne Rebels and Royal Insurance, director of Harris Scarfe (1997–2001); chairman of the Royal Australian Holdings Ltd, the Royal Life Insurance Australia Ltd, the State Training Board of Victoria, the Get Going Sport Foundation; director of AAMI and Tisdall Wines; inducted into the AFL Hall of Fame in 2009
- Wayne Reid OBE, president of Tennis Australia
- Graeme Samuel AC, former chairman of the Australian Competition & Consumer Commission

== Entertainment, media and the arts ==
=== Actors ===
- Laura Brent, actor
- Isabella Dunwill, actor
- William Franklyn, British actor
- Christopher Gabardi, actor
- Christopher "Kick" Gurry, Hollywood actor (star of Speed Racer, Looking for Alibrandi)
- Jane Harber, actor
- Alan Hopgood, actor and dramatist
- Lachy Hulme, actor
- Samuel Johnson, actor, AFI recipient and Logies nominee, radio host (Nova FM)
- Lloyd Lamble (1934–2008), Australian and British film, theatre, radio and television actor
- Kyal Marsh, actor
- Eloise Mignon, actor (also attended St Michael's Grammar School, St Kilda)
- Chris Scalzo, actor
- Jason Stephens, actor
- Ashley Zukerman, actor

=== Comedians ===
- Richard Stubbs, comedian

=== Musicians ===
- David Briggs, musician (Little River Band)
- Sophia Brous, musician, former program director of the Melbourne Jazz Festival and former curator of music at the Adelaide Festival
- Justine Electra, musician
- Paul Grabowsky, musician
- The Groop, 1960s rock band (original lineup)
- Louis Lavater (1867–1953), composer and author
- Ollie McGill, musician (keyboard player in The Cat Empire)
- The Temper Trap, band
- Bruce Watson, songwriter

=== Producers ===
- Malcolm Douglas, Australian wildlife documentary filmmaker and crocodile hunter

=== Radio and television ===
- Derek Guille, musician and radio host
- Lloyd Lamble, radio announcer (3DB)
- Pete Smith, radio and television announcer
- Richard Stubbs, Melbourne ABC radio host

=== Other ===
- Charles Baeyertz, publisher of The Triad, critic and broadcaster
- Margaret Jane Gurney, Australian artist (Methodist Ladies' College, Elsternwick)
- Barry Kay, stage and costume designer and photographer
- Frank Arthur Nankivell, artist
- Rohan Rivett, journalist and editor
- Athol Shmith, photographer
- John Spooner, political illustrator (The Age), 2002 winner of the Graham Perkin Award for the Australian Journalist of the Year
- Shura Taft, television and radio presenter
- Tom Wright, writer

== Military ==
Victoria Cross recipients

- Captain Robert Cuthbert Grieve VC

Australian Army

- Major General Herbert William Lloyd CB CMG CVO DSO
- Major General Edward Milford CB CBE DSO
- Major General George Vasey CB CBE DSO Bar
- Major General John Whitelaw AO CBE, son of Major General John Stewart Whitelaw
- Major General John Stewart Whitelaw CB CBE

== Politics and government ==
- Kenneth Bailey
- James Bennett
- Russell Broadbent, Federal MP
- Ian Castles, economist and Australian statistician
- Ian Cathie, Labor Victorian State Cabinet Minister
- Sam Cohen, Senator for Victoria
- Harold Edward Holt CH, Prime Minister of Australia
- Julian Hill, Federal MP
- Michael Kroger
- Major General Herbert William Lloyd CB, CMG, CVO, DSO
- Sam Loxton OBE
- Alexander Mair, Premier of New South Wales
- John Maynard Hedstrom, member of the Legislative Council of Fiji
- Andrew McCutcheon, Labor Victorian State Cabinet Minister
- Sir Robert Gordon Menzies KT CH AK PC KC, Prime Minister of Australia
- Peter Nixon, National Party politician, Federal cabinet minister
- Senator John Siddons, Australian Senator
- Bruce Arthur Smith
- Senator Reg Turnbull, Leader of the Australia Party
- William Henry Williams

== Law ==
- The Hon. Chief Justice Michael Black AC QC, Queen's Counsel
- The Hon. Philip Mandie QC, Justice of Victorian Court of Appeal (2009–2012) and of Supreme Court of Victoria (1994–2012)
- Sir Robert Gordon Menzies KT CH AK PC KC, King's Counsul
- Stuart Morris QC, Queen's Counsel
- The Hon. Justice Geoffrey Nettle QC, Queen's Counsel, current Justice of the High Court of Australia
- Fred Whitlam, Australian Commonwealth Crown Solicitor (1936–1949); father of former Prime Minister of Australia Gough Whitlam

== Sciences, medicine, architecture and engineering ==
- Doctor Tony Atkins AM, medical practitioner recognised for his work in famine relief and agricultural development in Africa
- Professor Sir Robert Chapman CMG, first Professor of Physics and Engineering at Adelaide University
- Herbert Dennis, architect
- Doctor Andrew Dent AM, medical doctor and humanitarian worker
- Professor Graham Farquhar AO, FAA, FRS
- Doctor Alan William Greenwood CBE FRSE, zoologist and geneticist
- Charles Hoadley, geologist and Antarctic explorer
- Doctor John Orchard AM, sports and exercise medicine physician recognised for his work in cricket
- Doctor Joseph Lade Pawsey, pioneer of the study of radio astronomy in Australia
- Sir David Rivett KCMG, chemist, chairman and chief executive officer of the CSIR and founder of the CSIRO
- Walter Rosenhain, metallurgist
- John Springthorpe, physician
- William Sutherland, physicist
- Sir William George Dismore Upjohn, surgeon and chancellor of Melbourne University
- Professor Carl Wood AC CBE FRCS FRANZCOG, IVF pioneer, Monash University

== Sport ==
=== Athletics ===
- Ted Best, Commonwealth Games track and field athlete (1938)
- Emma Carney, World Cross Country Championships distance runner (1993, 1994)
- Clare Carney, World Cross Country Championships distance runner (1994)
- Dean Kenneally, Commonwealth Games track and field athlete (1994)
- Jemima Montag (born 1998), Olympic racewalker, 3x Commonwealth Games champion

=== Australian rules football ===
- Ross Abbey, Footscray Football Club
- Ray Allsopp, Richmond Football Club
- Stuart Anderson, Fremantle Football Club and North Melbourne Football Club
- Simon Arnott, Geelong Football Club and Sydney Swans
- Darren Baxter, Hawthorn and Footscray
- James Bennett, Hawthorn Football Club
- Peter Bennett, St Kilda Football Club
- George Bickford, Melbourne Football Club
- Peter Box, Footscray Football Club and Brownlow Medalist
- Frank Boynton, Melbourne Football Club, Geelong Football Club and University Football Club
- Adam Cerra, Carlton Football Club
- Arch Corbett, Melbourne University Football Club (VFL)
- Harry Curtis, Collingwood Football Club and Carlton Football Club
- Kate Dempsey, Richmond AFLW
- Jasmine Fleming, Hawthorn Football Club
- Sam Frost, Greater Western Sydney Giants and Melbourne Football Club
- Warwick Green, St Kilda Football Club
- Toby Greene, Greater Western Sydney Giants
- Will Johnson, St Kilda Football Club
- Allan McKellar, Richmond and Sydney
- Stephen Mount, Richmond, 1980 premiership
- George Moysey, Melbourne (VFA), Melbourne (VFL), Perth, Subiaco
- Ross Oakley, St Kilda Football Club
- Roy Park, Melbourne Football Club and Melbourne University Football Club
- Arthur Pearce, St Kilda Football Club
- Pepa Randall, GWS AFLW
- Gordon Rattray, Fitzroy Football Club, Brighton Football Club; first to use the torpedo punt
- Les Reeves, North Melbourne Football Club
- Nick Ries, Hawthorn Football Club
- Elijah Tsatas, Essendon
- Ivor Warne-Smith, Melbourne Football Club, dual Brownlow Medallist
- Fergus Watts, Adelaide Crows Football Club

=== Baseball ===
- Michael Nakamura, Olympic athlete (1996, 2000) and Major League Baseball player

=== Basketball ===
- Alanna Smith, WNBA player and Olympic bronze medalist for the Australia women's national basketball team

=== Cricket ===
- Ross Gregory, First Class cricketer for Australia and Victoria
- Ian Johnson CBE, Australian Test Cricketer (Captain 1956) and member of "The Invincibles"
- Sam Loxton, Australian Test cricketer (1948–1951) and member of "The Invincibles"
- Dirk Nannes, First Class cricketer for Victoria
- Roy Park, First Class cricketer for Australia and Victoria
- Keith Rigg, First Class cricketer for Australia and Victoria
- Edward Rush, First Class cricketer for Victoria
- Carl Willis, First Class cricketer for Victoria

=== Cycling ===
- Robert Crowe, 2004 World Record 4000m tandem pursuit with Kieran Modra (4 mins 21.451)
- Katie Mactier, track cycling Olympic silver medalist (2004), Commonwealth Games gold medalist (2006), and World Champion (2005)

=== Netball ===
- Molly Jovic
- Sharelle McMahon, Australian netball Captain, world champion (1995, 1999) and Commonwealth Games netballer (1998, 2002, 2006, 2010)

=== Rowing ===
- Paul Guest, three time Olympian rower and Family Court of Australia judge
- Nicholas Lavery, Olympic men's eight Tokyo 2020

=== Sailing ===
- Jesse Martin, youngest person to have circumnavigated the globe solo, non-stop and unassisted (age 17); Ambassador of Reach Young & Young Endeavour

=== Swimming ===
- Michael Klim OAM, Olympic gold medallist (1996, 2000, 2004), world record holder (1996–2000), Commonwealth Games athlete (1998, 2006) and Australian Representative (1996, 1997, 1998, 1999, 2000, 2001, 2002)

=== Triathlon ===
- Emma Carney, Triathlon World Champion 1994, 1997 World Number 1 Triathlete (1995, 1996, 1997) Australian Representative (1994, 1995, 1996, 1997, 1998, 1999, 2000, 2001, 2002, 2003, 2004); also represented Australia in Athletics

=== Tennis ===
- Mark Philippoussis, professional tennis player, runner-up at Wimbledon and US Open and Olympic athlete for tennis (1996, 2000, 2004)
- Christina Wheeler, member of the Federation Cup team (2001)

=== Water polo ===
- Peter Bennett, Olympic athlete (1952, 1956) and Commonwealth Games athlete (1950)

=== Other ===
- Curtis Good, footballer for Newcastle United
- Jack Hingert, footballer for Brisbane Roar in the A-League
- Mick Parker, mountaineer

== Sources ==
- A brief history of Wesley College sport Wesley College, Melbourne (2006)
- Adamson Theatre Company Wesley College, Melbourne – Performing Arts, Season Brochures
