= John Whitelaw =

John Whitelaw may refer to:

- John Whitelaw (footballer), player in the 1947 Scottish League Cup Final (October)
- John Whitelaw (general, born 1894), Australian major general
- John Whitelaw (general, born 1921), Australian major general, son of the above
- John Whitelaw (harpsichord), American harpsichordist

== See also ==
- Whitelaw (surname)
