= Frank Boynton =

Frank Boynton may refer to:

- Frank Ellis Boynton (1859–1942), American botanist
- Frank Boynton (footballer) (1887–1946), player in the Australian Football League
- Frank Boynton (golfer) (born c.1936), American golfer
