= Sam Loxton =

Australian sportsman and politician (1921–2011)

Sam Loxton OBE
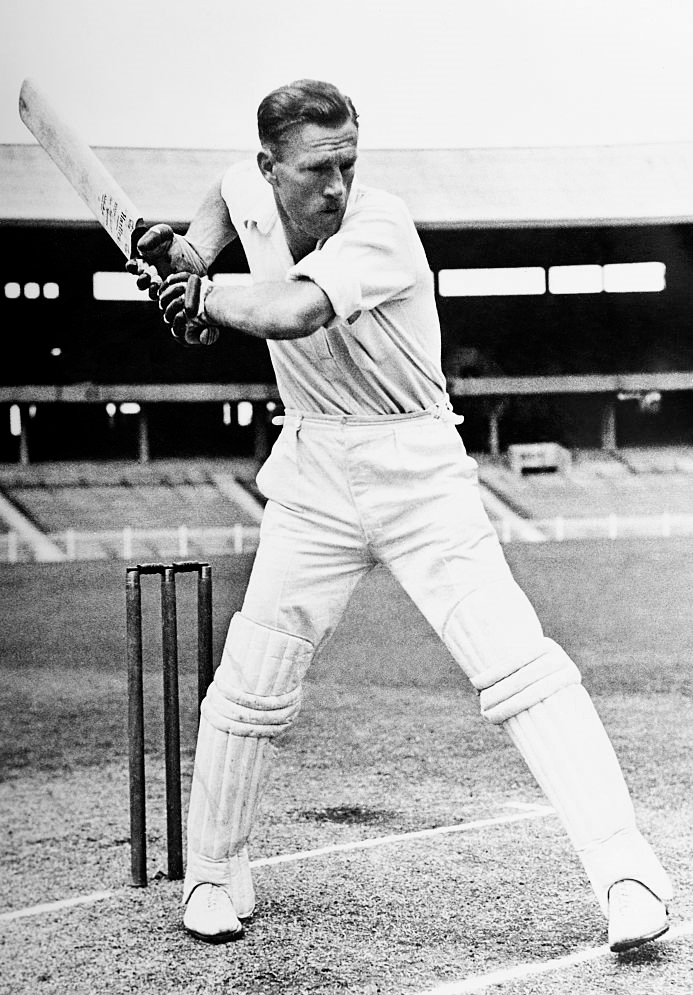
- Loxton c. 1948

Personal information
- Full name: Samuel John Everett Loxton
- Born: 29 March 1921; Albert Park, Victoria, Australia
- Died: 3 December 2011 (aged 90); Gold Coast, Queensland, Australia
- Batting: Right-handed
- Bowling: Right-arm fast-medium
- Role: All-rounder

International information
- National side: Australia
- Test debut (cap 180): 6 February 1948 v India
- Last Test: 9 January 1951 v England

Domestic team information
- Years: Team
- 1946/47–1957/58: Victoria

Career statistics
Competition	Test	First-class
Matches	12	140
Runs scored	554	6,249
Batting average	36.93	36.97
100s/50s	1/3	13/32
Top score	101	232*
Balls bowled	906	15,153
Wickets	8	232
Bowling average	43.62	25.73
5 wickets in innings	0	3
10 wickets in match	0	0
Best bowling	3/55	6/49
Catches/stumpings	7/–	84/–
- Source: CricketArchive, 22 December 2007

Samuel John Everett Loxton OBE (29 March 1921 – 3 December 2011) was an Australian cricketer, footballer and politician. As a cricket player he played in 12 Tests for Australia from 1948 to 1951. A right-handed all-rounder, Loxton was part of the Invincibles, who went through the 1948 tour of England undefeated, an unprecedented achievement that has never been matched. As well as being a hard-hitting batsman, Loxton was a right-arm swing bowler who liked to aim at the upper bodies of the opposition, and an outfielder with an accurate and powerful throw. After being dropped from the national team, Loxton represented Victoria for seven more seasons before retiring from first-class cricket. He served as an administrator after his playing days were over and spent 24 years as a Liberal Party member of the Victorian Legislative Assembly. Up until 1946, Loxton also played in the Victorian Football League (VFL) for St Kilda as a forward. In all three arenas, he was known for his energetic approach.

Educated at Wesley College, Melbourne, Loxton first gained prominence as an Australian rules football player. After debuting in 1942, he played 41 games in the VFL for St Kilda as a forward, kicking a total of 114 goals before retiring at the end of the 1946 season to concentrate on his cricket career. In 1944, he headed St Kilda's goal-kicking aggregate with 52 goals and placed second in the club's Best and Fairest. Loxton served in a tank division during World War II and made his first-class cricket debut in 1946–47. He scored 232 not out, which remains a record for any Australian player on his first-class debut. After a strong first season, Loxton was selected to make his Test debut in the final match of the 1947–48 home series against India. Australia had already won the series and used the last match to trial their young talent. Loxton seized his opportunity, scoring 80 and taking three wickets, securing himself a position on the 1948 England tour.

After a slow start to the historic campaign, Loxton struck form midway through the English summer and forced his way into the team for the last three Tests. He played a prominent role in the Fourth Test, scoring an aggressive and counterattacking 93 that helped Australia pry the initiative from England; the tourists eventually won the match. In 1949–50, Loxton cemented his position in the national team, playing in all five Tests in South Africa and scoring his only century at international level. He remained a regular member of the Test team until a form slump during the 1950–51 home season; he was dropped after three Tests against England and never played for Australia again. Loxton continued to play for Victoria in domestic competition until retiring at the end of the 1957–58 season.

A member of the Liberal Party, Loxton entered politics and was a member of the Victorian Legislative Assembly, representing the electoral district of Prahran from 1955 to 1979. During this time, Loxton was also active in cricket administration at club, state and international level. He was a state selector for over two decades, and served at national level for ten years, starting in 1970–71. He was also the team manager for Australia's tour of the subcontinent in 1959–60, overseeing a successful campaign despite a spate of serious illnesses to personnel. Loxton had to deal with a variety of tumultuous events on and off the field during his tenure, often relating to player misconduct, and retired from cricket administration in 1981 following the underarm incident.

== Early and war years ==
Loxton was born on 29 March 1921 at Albert Park, Victoria, the son of Sam Sr. and Annie. The elder Sam Loxton was an electrician who played second grade cricket for Collingwood. The younger Sam started his education at Yarra Park State School, where he learned to bat, using a pine tree in the schoolyard as the stumps; the same tree was used for the same purpose years earlier by Test players Vernon Ransford and Ernie McCormick, and long-serving Victorian batsman Jack Ledward. The family moved to Armadale, and young Loxton attended Armadale Public School before completing his secondary education at Wesley College, Melbourne, an elite private boys' school. One of his colleagues at Wesley College was Ian Johnson, a future teammate for Victoria and Australia. The boys' school coach was P. L. Williams, a renowned mentor of teenagers who had earlier coached Ross Gregory and future Test captain Lindsay Hassett. Away from his sporting commitments at school, Loxton played district cricket for Prahran's third grade team when he was just 12. The young cricketer's parents were stalwarts of the club; Sam Sr. was the scorer and served as a transport man, driving the matting and equipment to matches, while Annie made cucumber sandwiches for 25 years—due to the economic difficulties caused by the Great Depression and World War II, meat catering for players was a luxury even at first-class and international matches. The elder Sam was a member of the club committee from 1941 until his death in 1974, and was a vice-president for the last 17 years of his life. At the age of 16, the younger Loxton was selected in the Victorian Cricket Association Colts team that played in the first grade competition in 1937–38; he played three seasons with the outfit, which was effectively a state youth team. The squad was coached by Bert Cohen and former Test batsman and captain Jack Ryder, and Loxton credited the latter as the biggest influence on his career, saying

He was an inspiration so far as I was concerned. He had so much to do with my early grounding. Old Jack never had a drink and never smoked a cigarette in his life and nobody walked so tall as that man. He was my cricket father, no doubt about that at all.

Loxton improved significantly in his third season with the Colts, scoring his first century and taking 21 wickets, having managed only seven scalps in the two previous summers. In 1940–41, aged 19, he moved back to Prahran to play in their first grade team after the Colts were disbanded, and he became more productive over the next few years, taking 46 wickets in one season.

Loxton also played Australian rules football, and in 1942, he made his debut in the Victorian Football League (VFL)—the highest tier of competition at the time—playing for St Kilda. One of his teammates was Keith Miller, a future Invincibles colleague. Loxton played as both a forward and a defender, and the pair sometimes played together in attack. The recruit from Prahran played in only six matches in his first year, kicking 15 goals. Debuting in round six, he started his career brightly, kicking five and four goals in his first two matches against Melbourne and Collingwood respectively, helping his team to two victories. However, the goals and victories began to dry up and Loxton managed only six goals and one win in the remaining four matches. St Kilda came second to last and did not make the finals.

During World War II, Loxton served with the 2nd Armoured Division. He enlisted on 31 July 1942 at Oakleigh, Victoria and was discharged on 7 November 1945 with the rank of sergeant, having spent most of his time at the division headquarters. The war ended Loxton and Miller's partnership at St Kilda. Miller was deployed to South Australia for training before becoming a fighter pilot in England, while his St Kilda colleague served in a reserve unit in Melbourne, enabling him to continue his football career when granted leave. In 1943, Loxton played in only the last four matches of the season, all of which were lost, kicking seven goals, and St Kilda finished last with a solitary victory from ten games. He managed three goals each against Essendon and South Melbourne but was held goal-less against Melbourne. The following year, Loxton played in all 18 matches and topped St Kilda's goal-kicking aggregates with 52. After making a slow start to the season, aggregating only four goals in the first four matches, including two goal-less outings, he began to score more heavily. The St Kilda forward registered a six-goal haul against Geelong in round eight, helping to secure an away win, and scored 23 goals in the last six matches, including five in each of the last three matches. However, St Kilda won only one of these three matches. Loxton's efforts helped his club to finish ninth out of 12 teams, and he came second in the club Best and Fairest. He played a solitary match in 1945, which St Kilda lost, and went goal-less.

== First-class and Test debut ==
An attacking right-handed middle-order batsman and a right-arm fast-medium bowler, Loxton spent much of his cricket career in the shadow of Miller, who played the same type of role. Upon Miller's death in 2004, he said "I was in Keith's shadow all my career ... and it was a pretty big shadow." First-class cricket resumed in 1945–46 after the end of the war, but Loxton failed to gain state selection during the season. He played his final VFL season in 1946 and was chosen in 12 of St Kilda's 19 games, kicking 40 goals. However, his team won only two of these 12 matches, and finished second last. Loxton had a strong start to his final season, kicking 34 goals in the first 8 rounds. This included a career best of eight goals in another away win over Geelong. He also added six goals apiece against Footscray and Collingwood, but it was not enough to prevent defeats. However, Loxton missed three matches after the eighth round and upon his return, struggled and managed only six goals in his last four matches for St Kilda.

Having retired from top-tier football, Loxton soon broke into first-class cricket. He was selected for Victoria to make his debut in the match against Queensland in December 1946 because five players, including Miller, were playing in a Test match for Australia against England during their Test tour. The debutant scored 232 not out, sharing a Victorian record sixth-wicket partnership of 289 with Doug Ring, who made 145. When he had scored 183, Loxton hit himself on the head with his bat in attempting a hook shot, but continued batting until the end of Victoria's innings and then opened the bowling in Queensland's innings. He took the first wicket before going off to hospital with concussion. Recovering in time to bowl in the second innings, he took 2 wickets for 40 runs (2/40) in an innings win. Loxton's 232 not out remains a record debut score in Australian first-class cricket. His debut performance was enough for him to keep his place when the Test players returned, and he scored 73 and took a total of 3/17 in the next match against arch-rivals New South Wales, which Victoria won by an innings. He compiled 87 in the next match against Queensland, and Victoria won all but one of the five Sheffield Shield matches in which he played—the only draw was washed out—to claim the title. The all-rounder finished the season atop Victoria's batting averages, with 429 runs at a batting average of 143.00. He also headed the bowling averages with 8 wickets at 14.00 runs apiece.

The following season, Loxton's record was less spectacular despite playing in all but one of Victoria's matches. He hit 77 and 35 not out in the opening match of the summer against the Indian tourists, and was rewarded with selection in an Australian XI to play the visitors ahead of the Tests. In what was effectively a Test trial, the uncapped all-rounder failed to impress with the bat, making a duck and six. He bowled extensively, sending down 47 overs and taking a total of 4/113 as the Australians fell to a defeat. Loxton was passed over for Test selection and returned to domestic competition, scoring 53 and taking a total of 4/56 in the next match against New South Wales, which the Victorians won by nine wickets. He then went into an unproductive sequence, failing to pass 31 and taking only three wickets in his next four matches over a two-month period. His seven wickets in the Sheffield Shield games cost almost 49 runs each. Despite this, the Australian captain Don Bradman had been impressed by what he saw of Loxton at domestic level, and the Victorian all-rounder was chosen for the Fifth and final Test against India. With the series already convincingly won 3–0, Australia decided to rest several players in order to trial up and coming cricketers ahead of the 1948 tour of England. Len Johnson, Loxton and fellow Victorian Ring were thus given their Test debuts.

Australia batted first and Loxton came in to bat in front of a supportive home crowd at the Melbourne Cricket Ground. He made 80, putting on 159 with fellow Victorian Neil Harvey, who made his first Test century in his second international match, as Australia amassed 8/575. The debutant all-rounder said that he was nervous but Harvey "was going along merrily and he soon settled me down". Bradman fell ill and Bill Brown led the Australians in the field during the first innings. Understanding that one of the objectives was to give the new players an opportunity to show their talent, Brown threw the ball to his debutants. Johnson was given the ball first change, but failed to make an impact, so Loxton was handed his chance. He had a catch dropped early on but ended with 2/61 in the first innings, removing Hemu Adhikari and then Vinoo Mankad. In the words of Brown, the Victorian all-rounder "looked twice the bowler Johnson did". The Victorian debutant took the wicket of Adhikari in the second innings as Australia enforced the follow on and skittled India by 67 to win by an innings. The Test debut performance won Loxton a place on the Invincibles tour to England in 1948. He reflected that "It's not the fellow who gets the opportunity it's the fellow who puts his hands around it and grabs it. I just happened to be in the right place at the right time." After his position in the touring party was confirmed, he continued his late-season resurgence, scoring two fifties for the Australians in two matches against Tasmania before they departed for England.

== Invincibles tour ==
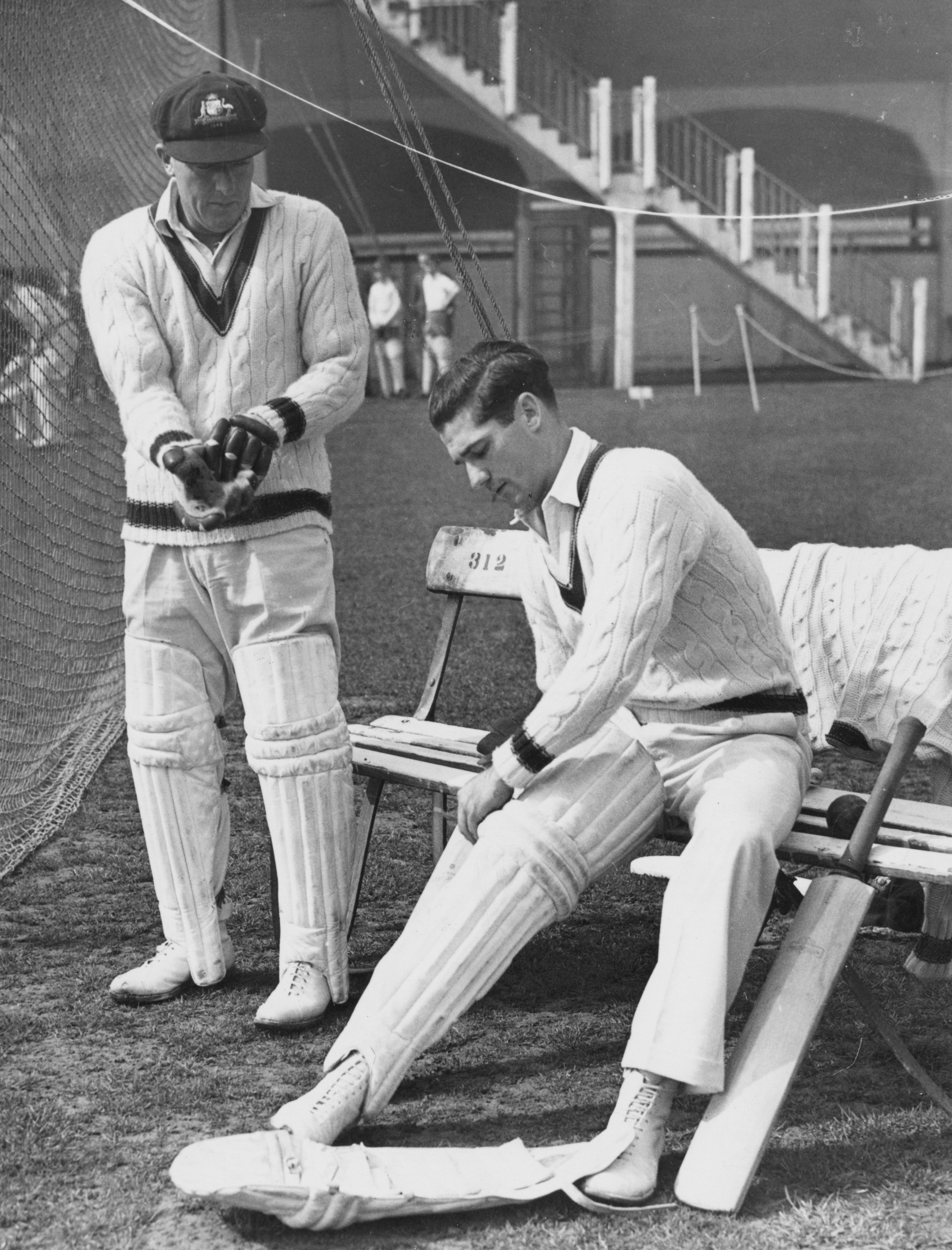
Loxton (left) congratulates Harvey with his first century in a Test against England

Loxton started his English campaign slowly. Australia typically selected their strongest team for the tour opener against Worcestershire, and the all-rounder was omitted as the visitors won by an innings. As the Australians often played six days a week, they employed a rotation policy in the county matches, and in the second game against Leicestershire, Loxton made his debut on English soil. He made only four, before opening the bowling in both innings and taking a total of 1/23 in an innings victory. His attempts to break into the first-choice team were hampered by a groin strain he suffered in the third match against Yorkshire when he was striving for extra pace in his only over in the first innings. As a result, he played no further part in the match. One man down, Australia came closest to losing for the whole tour. They fell to 6/31 in pursuit of 60—effectively seven down with Loxton unable to bat—before scraping home without further loss after Yorkshire dropped both batsmen.

The injured all-rounder missed two matches to recuperate before reappearing in mid-May, hitting 120 as the Australians posted a total of 721 against Essex in a single day at Southend, still the highest single day's total in first-class cricket. He put on 166 in 65 minutes with Ron Saggers, who, with Bill Brown and Donald Bradman, also scored centuries. Loxton's rapid innings was noted for its hooking and driving and took around 80 minutes. He followed up with an unbeaten 79 and two wickets in the match against Oxford University, but that failed to win him a place in the first set-piece battle of the summer, against the Marylebone Cricket Club at Lord's. The MCC fielded seven players who would represent England in the Tests, and were basically a full-strength Test outfit, while Australia fielded their strongest XI, so the fixture was effectively a dress rehearsal for the Tests. Bradman opted to play Brown out of the position in the middle-order, and Loxton missed out; Australia went on to win by an innings.

Loxton then played in each of Australia's four remaining tour games before the Tests, but was unable to do enough to force his way into the first-choice team. He made 39 and 52 against Lancashire, and 16 against Nottinghamshire, squandering his starts in the latter two innings to run outs. In the match against Hampshire, he made one in his only innings after Australia were caught on a damp pitch and took a solitary wicket. The Australian team's batting depth did not help Loxton's cause; in the final pre-Test match against Sussex, a match won by an innings and 325 runs, he was slated to bat at No. 9, but Australia's earlier batsmen were largely untroubled so Bradman declared at 5/549. The all-rounder's 3/13 in the first innings had the effect of removing him from the bowling line-up for the rest of the match, as Doug Ring, Ernie Toshack, Ron Hamence and Ian Johnson helped Ray Lindwall to bowl the touring team to an easy victory. Loxton had limited opportunities as those ahead of him tended to finish off the opposition before his turn, and did not score heavily enough when he had a chance, so he was overlooked for the First Test at Trent Bridge. Bradman again opted to use Brown out of position in the middle-order as Australia took an eight-wicket win.

There were only two matches between the First and Second Tests. Loxton took a total of 2/29 and scored only 17 against Northamptonshire, and was rested against Yorkshire. Brown made a century in the latter match, and Australia fielded an unchanged team for the Second Test at Lord's and completed another victory. As the tour reached its halfway point, the Victorian began to make an impression. In the next county game, his opening partnership with Neil Harvey scored the 122 runs needed to beat Surrey in only 58 minutes, Loxton making 47. He also took a total 3/90 for the match, bowling 43 overs as Bradman allowed his main bowlers to recuperate after the previous Test. In the following match against Gloucestershire he contributed an unbeaten 159 including four sixes, as Australia made their highest score for the summer, 7/774 declared. The all-rounder's innings involved a series of powerful strokes and he was particularly noted for using his feet to charge and attack the off spin of Tom Goddard. The Gloucestershire bowler had been touted as a possible Test selection, because the other England bowlers had failed to contain Australia's batsman in the first two matches, but his chances of selection were ended by the tourists' assault at Bristol.

These performances won Loxton selection for the Third Test, played at Old Trafford, where he replaced Brown, who had struggled in the middle-order, averaging less than 25 in the unfamiliar environment. The match was the most evenly contested Test of the series, with England in control before four sessions were lost to rain on the last two days, resulting in a draw. Loxton bowled 15 overs in all without success, and made 36 runs batting at No. 7 in the first innings, helping Australia to avoid the follow on. In the first innings, he ran out Alec Bedser, ending a 121-run partnership between Bedser and Denis Compton.

The Victorian all-rounder then top-scored with 123 and took a total of 4/48 in a nine-wicket win in the intervening county match against Middlesex at Lord's, and he retained his place in the side for the Fourth Test at Leeds. Loxton was not involved in the second inning effort in which the Australians scored 3/404 on the final day, a world record for a successful Test run-chase, but he had taken three of the last four wickets in England's first innings of 496 and scored a hard-hitting 93 in the first innings, putting on 105 in 95 minutes with Harvey. Their counterattacking partnership helped Australia to halt the English momentum after an early collapse; the score was still 4/189 when Loxton came in to bat. He was particularly severe on Jim Laker, lifting his off breaks into the crowd for four of his five sixes, mostly from lofted drives. With a maiden Test century beckoning, the Victorian swung wildly at a Norman Yardley ball and was bowled. In the dressing room, Sir Robert Menzies, a Prime Minister of Australia well known as a cricket-lover, upbraided him, saying "That was a pretty stupid thing to do. You could have made a century", to which the fallen batsman retorted, "Haven't you made a few mistakes in your time, too?" Nevertheless, Australia eventually proceeded from 6/329 at the time of Loxton's departure to end on 458, almost nullifying the effect of England's strong first innings total.

Immediately after the Fourth Test, Loxton scored 51 and took a total of 4/43 in an innings victory over Derbyshire, but was less productive in his remaining three matches before the Fifth Test, totaling only four wickets and 17 runs in three completed innings. He retained his position for the final Test of the series, but had little to do in an innings victory. He was required to bowl only two overs in the first innings as the frontline pacemen cut down the hosts for only 52, and then scored 15 in Australia's reply of 389. In the second innings he bowled ten overs without taking a wicket. The Victorian all-rounder was not prominent in his four matches after the Tests, totaling only 112 runs and five wickets. His most successful returns were four wickets for the match in an innings victory over Kent, and a quickfire 67 not out in 75 minutes against the South of England. In the final match of the England leg of the tour—there were two matches in Scotland afterwards—he hit a ball from Freddie Brown into his face, breaking his nose, thus forcing him to miss the final two matches in Scotland.

On the tour as a whole, Loxton scored 973 runs at an average of 57.23 and took 32 wickets at 21.71. Such was the strength of the team he was only fifth in the batting averages and eighth among the bowlers. Wisden Cricketers' Almanack summed up his contribution thus:

A fine driving batsman with a fierce square cut, Loxton achieved little as a bowler, but he played his part as an all-rounder, one of many in the team; in addition to his batting feats, he kept the game alive by his unlimited enthusiasm. Whether in stopping the ball or hurling down the wicket from almost any angle, he won the admiration of all who appreciated keenness in the field.

== Heading for South Africa ==
There were no Tests during the 1948–49 season in Australia, with only domestic matches scheduled. Loxton played regularly for Victoria, scoring 500 runs in the Sheffield Shield, compiling 135 against South Australia and 84 against Queensland. He scored 60 and took a total of 5/77 in one match against New South Wales, but Victoria was unable to win either match against their arch-rivals, who took the title.

Two big set-piece matches, a testimonial match for Bradman and a joint benefit for Alan Kippax and Bert Oldfield, were used by the selectors as a trial for the 1949–50 South African tour. Loxton played in both testimonial matches; he failed to pass 21 in the first match but took a total of 4/100. In the latter match he scored 93. The Victorian all-rounder ended the season with 634 runs at 42.26 and 16 wickets at 24.31 and was selected for the South African tour under the leadership of the newly appointed captain Lindsay Hassett.

Like the Invincibles tour, the 1949–50 Test series in South Africa was another triumph for the Australians. They won four of the five Tests and were undefeated in 21 first-class matches. Loxton started the tour strongly, making 117 in the opening match against Zululand, which was not first-class. He continued his productivity in the succeeding games, never failing to pass 40 in any completed innings in the first five first-class matches of the tour. This included an all-round effort of 76 not out and a total of 4/10 in an innings victory over Orange Free State. However, the Victorian's form slumped just before the Tests. He made single figure scores in his last three innings, including in the last match against a South African XI in what was effectively a dry run for the Tests. However, he did take 4/32 for the match.

Loxton played in all five Tests, and in the First Test at the Wanderers in Johannesburg, he scored his first Test century. He compiled 101 in 150 minutes, helping Australia to a total of 413 after both opening batsmen were out without scoring. Hassett's men went on to win the match by an innings. The Second Test was an eight-wicket victory for the Australians, this time dominated by Harvey's 178, with whom Loxton shared a 140-run stand for the fifth wicket, contributing 35 himself. He also took a wicket. The Third Test at Kingsmead in Durban was dramatic; batting first, South Africa made 311 and Hugh Tayfield then took 7/23 as Australia collapsed to 75 all out after the rain and sun had baked the playing surface into a sticky wicket. During the first innings, Hassett changed his batting order so that his better batsmen were low down in the order so that they could bat in better conditions as the pitch stabilised. Loxton batted at No. 10 and Harvey at No. 9, but the Australians collapsed before the pitch had changed measurably. Not enforcing the follow-on, the South Africans batted again and were themselves bowled out for 99, losing their last seven wickets for 14 runs. This left Australia to chase 336 runs for victory, highly unlikely as the last 28 wickets had fallen for only 245. The tourists were still more than 200 runs in arrears when Loxton came in to join Harvey. On Loxton's first ball, a delivery from Tayfield narrowly missed his edge. He survived to lunch after being caught from a no-ball on the long on boundary from a lofted drive. With an unbeaten 151, Harvey took Australia to an improbable five-wicket victory, supported by his fellow Victorian, who scored 54 in a century partnership.

The Fourth Test of the series was a high-scoring draw, Loxton making six in his only innings. His 43 in the final Test of the series was overshadowed by centuries for three of his teammates, in an innings win that sealed the series 4–0. In the Test series as a whole, the Victorian all-rounder made 255 runs at an average of 42.50, but bowled only 34 overs in taking two wickets. He made little impact on the tour matches after the start of the Tests, passing fifty twice and taking two wickets from 13 overs in five matches. For the entire tour, Loxton totaled 809 first-class runs at 40.45 and took 12 wickets.

== Final Tests ==
Loxton had an unproductive time during the 1950–51 Australian season. He lost his Test place after three matches, and in Sheffield Shield games his highest score for the season was just 62. In the first match of the season, he made four for Victoria against Freddie Brown's touring team, a portent of the coming season. However, he did bounce back in the final match before the Tests, scoring 62 and 37 and taking 3/24 against New South Wales. The First Test of the Ashes series at Brisbane was decided largely by a tropical storm that completely changed the nature of the pitch after the first day. The Australian all-rounder had by then been the victim of a spectacular catch by England wicket-keeper Godfrey Evans, making 24 in Australia's 228. He picked up five catches—his first Test catches in his tenth match—as the Australians surrounded the English batsmen, who made 7/68 on the sticky wicket before Brown declared to force the Australian batsmen to suffer on the treacherous surface. Loxton was out for a duck in the second innings, unable to cope with the conditions, as did most of his compatriots. Australia collapsed to 3/0 before reaching 7/32, at which point Hassett declared after 78 minutes of batting. England fell to 6/30 at stumps in pursuit of 193. Twenty wickets had fallen in four hours, while only 102 runs had been scored. Australia eventually won the match by 71 runs.

In the Second Test at the Melbourne Cricket Ground, his last at his home ground, Loxton's 32 formed part of a stand of 84 with Hassett, the highest partnership in a closely fought, low-scoring game in which no team passed 200. He again failed in the second innings, scoring two as Australia scraped home by 28 runs. After contributing 17 in a total of 426 in the Third Test at the Sydney Cricket Ground, which Australia won by an innings to take an unassailable 3–0 series lead, he was dropped in favour of Jim Burke, who scored a century on debut. The Victorian never played Test cricket again.

Loxton returned to play for Victoria, and although he struggled for runs, managing only three fifties for the season, wickets came regularly. He took match totals of 4/55 and 3/24 against Queensland, 4/55 against South Australia and 2/23 against Western Australia; Victoria won all four matches, and claimed the Sheffield Shield. Playing in seven of the eight matches, he scored 309 runs at 30.90 and taking 16 wickets at 12.56.

== Later cricket ==
Although his Test career had finished, Loxton continued to play for his state. He had another disappointing season with the bat in 1951–52, scoring only 322 runs at 24.76 in nine matches. After winning the opening match of the season against Western Australia, he did not taste victory again until the final fixture of the summer against South Australia, in which he scored 71—his only fifty of the season—and took a total of 4/37 in an innings victory. Victoria lost three times and would have suffered a fourth defeat but for Loxton's unbeaten 41 against Queensland, which helped them to hold on for a draw with one wicket intact. He continued to take regular wickets, ending with 21 scalps at 31.00 for the season, including an innings best of 4/56, but he managed a total of only 4/249 against New South Wales, who went on to win the competition.

Loxton had a more productive campaign during the 1952–53 season, scoring 470 runs at 33.57 and taking 23 wickets at 26.26 in nine matches. He broke through for his first first-class century in three years when he made 169 against New South Wales, but it was not enough to prevent an innings defeat. He scored 60 and took a match total of 5/102 in a match for Victoria against the touring South Africans early in the season, but this was not enough for him to regain his Test position. He bowled with steady results throughout the season, never taking more than three wickets in an innings and five in a match.

In 1953–54, Loxton was part of a Commonwealth team that toured India during the Australian season, playing in 15 first-class matches. He played in all five of the matches that were termed as "unofficial Tests" on this tour. The Victorian's first month on tour was keynoted by his bowling. He took 12 wickets at 19.75 but scored only 115 runs at 23.00 without passing 25 in the first four matches.

Loxton had no success in the first representative match, scoring 2 and 6 and taking 0/72 in an innings defeat. However, his fortunes turned in the next match against Bombay, when he took 5/92, the first five-wicket innings haul in his first-class career. He also scored 123, but was unable to force a victory. He carried the form into the next representative match, scoring 55 and taking a total of 3/99 in a drawn encounter. The Victorian continued his all-round form against Bengal, scoring 100 and taking 5/87 in an innings victory. His form tapered away thereafter and he failed to pass 40 and took a total of only four wickets in the three remaining representative matches. The Commonwealth outfit won the third match but lost the fourth, ceding the series 2–1. Loxton ended the tour with 647 runs at 35.94 and 33 wickets at 31.90, but struggled in the matches against India, scoring 148 runs at 21.14 and taking 7 wickets at 56.14.

After returning to Australia, Loxton had a torrid time with the bat in the 1954–55 season, scoring only 126 runs at 14.00 and failing to pass 30 in his six matches. He took 12 wickets at 32.41 for the season, the fewest wickets in any of his first-class seasons. The all-rounder's best effort was a 4/31 against New South Wales in a match that Victoria lost by nine wickets. Loxton had a more productive summer in 1955–56. In seven matches, he scored 286 runs at 40.85 including an unbeaten century against South Australia, and took 14 wickets at 20.07; his best was a 4/35 in the return match against South Australia. The Sheffield Shield was won by Victoria's bitter rivals New South Wales in both seasons.

In 1956–57, his penultimate season for Victoria, Loxton—aged nearly 36—scored 134 and took 2/30 to orchestrate an innings victory over South Australia in the second match of the summer. In the penultimate match of the season, which effectively determined the fate of the Sheffield Shield, the Victorian all-rounder took 4/44 to help dismiss New South Wales for 149 and take a 292-run first innings lead. However, the defending champions hung on for a draw to ensure the retention of their title. Loxton then surpassed his previous career best by taking 6/49 against Western Australia to set up a nine-wicket win in the last match of the season.

Loxton retired after playing in the 1957–58 season. With the Test players in South Africa, he made 331 runs at 41.37 including 2 centuries, and took 9 wickets at 26.33 in 8 matches. He made 107 in an innings triumph over Queensland and 106 in a drawn match against South Australia. It was not enough for him to win a third Sheffield Shield title; New South Wales won for the fifth successive time, defeating Victoria in both their matches. Loxton made little impact in his final match; although the Victorians defeated Queensland, his only participation was to score five runs in the first innings. His highest score remained the 232 not out he had made on his first-class debut.

Loxton continued to play for Prahran until 1962–63, and he topped the batting and bowling averages for the club on five and six occasions respectively. He topped both the batting and bowling averages in the same season on four occasions. The all-rounder scored a total of 6,038 runs at 31.3 and took 351 wickets at 18.4 during his first grade career between Prahran and Colts, and was named the captain of Prahran's honorary Team of the Century.

== Style ==
An aggressive right-handed all-rounder, Loxton tended to bat in the middle-order, and bowled after the new ball pacemen. As well as being a belligerent batsman, he was a right-arm fast-medium swing bowler known for his ability to move the ball, and a powerful outfielder. He had a strong arm and exploited his power frequently, to the extent that the Australian wicket-keeper Don Tallon complained about the jarring impact of his unnecessarily strong throws when the batsmen were already home and no run out was possible. Loxton was known for his energetic and aggressive approach to cricket, and liked to attack and intimidate opposition batsmen. In one match in the late-1950s, he bowled an eight-ball over at New South Welshman Norm O'Neill consisting entirely of bouncers aimed at the upper body. Loxton was not afraid of opposition bowlers doing the same to him; he had a penchant for trying to hook bouncers out of the ground. He was a predominantly back-foot player whose initial foot-movement tended to be back and towards and then across the stumps. When he committed to a back foot shot, Loxton often made such a decisive retreat that he almost stepped onto his stumps. One painter once captured the Victorian almost disturbing the woodwork with his right leg, leading Loxton to quip "That's what I call using the crease". Hassett said that his fellow Victorian "really used to give everything he had all the time... Put him on to bowl and he'd bowl his hardest, no matter how he felt." Bradman said that Loxton "never shirked the issue" and that "he'd throw himself into it with everything he had. This is one of the reasons he was a great team man. You could call on him at any stage and he'd give you his very best." Bradman said that the Victorian all-rounder "was never a great cricketer in the sense that some others were great, but he was a very good player and what he lacked in ability he made up for in effort". He further added that the Victorian was "the very essence of belligerence...His whole attitude suggests defiance and when he hits the ball it is the music of a sledgehammer." Former Test leg spinner Bill O'Reilly, while agreeing that Loxton was always energetic, regarded his bowling as being too dull and predictable to have any major impact at the highest level, and thought that the Victorian all-rounder's career would have been best served by saving his energy purely for batting.

As a footballer, Loxton usually played as a forward, but was also used as a full-back and alternated between the two positions. He was known for his physical strength; another VFL player who had a reputation as an "enforcer" tried to bump him and later said that the collision made him feel as though he had run into a goalpost. According to Robert Coleman, Loxton was "competitive, pugnacious and outspoken, with a doglike loyalty to everyone and everything he served, whether it was his captain, his team, his party, his premier or his constituents."

== Manager in 1959–60 ==
Loxton was the manager of the 1959–60 Australian team that toured Pakistan and India. By this time, only two colleagues from the 1948 Invincibles tour—Harvey and Ray Lindwall—remained. The Victorian was the first manager since World War II to not also be a member of the Australian Board of Control. It was widely believed that the high-ranking administrators saw the Indian subcontinent as an unenviable appointment; on past tours, many players had fallen seriously ill, suffered food poisoning, and found the oppressive heat and third world living conditions hard to bear. Some players were reluctant to tour and wanted to opt out. Loxton felt that his experience with the Commonwealth XI six years earlier was a factor in his selection and suspected that he was the only applicant, quipping "what board member would be silly enough to go there?"

Loxton was known for his blunt nature, and his appointment to a post that required him to liaise with cricket officials from opposing nations raised eyebrows. The cricket historian Gideon Haigh wrote "Thoughts of such a gruff, soldierly man acting the diplomat had caused great ribaldry". In a speech at a cricket dinner, his former captain Hassett joked "I would advise Mr [Prime Minister] Menzies to have army and navy standing by. A week after Sam gets to India, war is bound to break out."

On the field, the Australians—captained by Richie Benaud—were successful. They defeated Pakistan 2–0 in three Tests, and India 2–1 over five matches. Australia's only other Test win on Pakistani soil came in 1998 and they have won only two series in India since the Benaud-Loxton expedition. They also remained unbeaten outside the Test matches. Despite the success with bat and ball, the Australians were struck down by serious illness during the second part of their tour in India, despite taking Dr. Ian McDonald—a former Victorian first-class cricketer—with the travelling party. Gordon Rorke, Lindsay Kline and Gavin Stevens all contracted hepatitis; the former two were sent home, while the latter was too ill to fly back to Australia until the end of the tour. Harvey said that Stevens—who never played first-class cricket again after his illness—"could've been the first man to die on tour". Due to the bevy of unfit players, Loxton was forced to line up in one game, against Indian Universities in Bangalore, two years after playing his last first-class match. He scored 33 and bowled six overs without taking a wicket in a high-scoring draw.

There were several administrative difficulties during the tour. Bill Dowling—the chairman of the Australian Board of Control—had informed Loxton that no Test match was to begin until a receipt for 6,500 pounds had been handed over to Australian authorities. The Australian manager had also been told to rebuff any Pakistani overtures for a reciprocal tour, as it was feared that they lacked public appeal and would have caused financial losses due to a fall in ticket sales. Despite previous assurances to prepare turf pitches, the locals made a matting surface for the First Test. During the Second Test, when asked by General Ayub Khan—head of the ruling military junta—why Pakistan had not been invited to Australia, Loxton exploited the opportunity to complain about the wickets. When the tourists were greeted by another matting track in the Third Test, Ayub threatened to shoot the groundsmen if they prepared any more non-turf surfaces. The financial issue reared its head before the Second Test against India in Kanpur, when Loxton belligerently refused to start the match after the payment had failed to arrive on time. An Indian official asked the Australian manager to not "spoil a beautiful friendship over money", to which the Australian manager replied "Try me. I want it please...You know the rules." The match proceeded after the cheque was delivered, and India inflicted Australia's only defeat for the tour and their first Test win over the visitors. Another mishap occurred during the Fifth Test at Eden Gardens in Calcutta; the Australians left their hotel and took to the field with ten men, having failed to notice that Ian Meckiff had overslept and been left behind by the team bus. During the First Test against Pakistan in Dacca, one of the umpires took off his shoes and put them on the ground while play was in progress. Loxton took a photo of the scene and lodged it to cricket authorities, asking them to make a ruling on whether a batsman would be out if the ball struck the umpire's loose shoes and bounced up into a fielder's hands. However, he never received a reply.

== Political career ==
Loxton joined the Armadale branch of the Liberal Party in 1950. Henry Bolte, the Liberal leader in Victoria, was the state opposition leader at the time, and encouraged him to enter politics. The cricketer's entry into electoral politics came after he was involved in a debate at a cricket club meeting. A person at the gathering reported his argumentative performance to senior Liberal Party figures, and soon after, Bolte began actively courting the cricketer. On 28 September 1954, Loxton won pre-selection and was endorsed as the Liberal candidate for the electorate of Prahran. At the time, the seat was comfortably held by the ruling Labor Party (ALP), who had captured 61.59% of the vote at the previous election. The Liberals were not optimistic about their chances, and Bolte told his candidate "You won't win [the seat], but we'd like you to fly the flag".

The cricketer refused to think that his candidacy was simply there to make up the numbers, and he told Bolte as much. The start of the election campaign coincided with the 1954–55 grade cricket finals. Loxton took 7 wickets and scored 129 runs to help Prahran claim the title for the first time in 32 years, and was hailed as a local hero. It capped off a season in which he topped the competition batting averages and took the most wickets. In a close-run contest, the cricketer defeated the sitting ALP member Bob Pettiona by only 14 votes on the two party preferred count. He was aided by preferences from the Democratic Labor Party (DLP), which had broken away from the ALP during the 1950s, claiming that it was too soft towards communism; fears of left-wing influence was causing great concern in Australian society at the time. Loxton polled 35.70% of the first preferences, well behind Pettiona's 47.25%, but received almost all of the DLP's 13.66% of the vote as preferences to end with 50.04%. The result helped bring Bolte's Liberals to power, and they stayed in office until 1982, by which time Loxton had retired.

Loxton entered the Victorian parliament in 1955, and served as government whip from 1961 until his retirement in 1979. At the time of his election, he was the youngest member of parliament, and was given the honour of making the Address-in-Reply, the first speech after opening of the new sitting by the governor, using it to advocate increased lending from the government-owned banks to promote higher levels of home ownership. At the 1958 election, Loxton consolidated his hold on the seat, leading on first preferences (43.67%), and ending with 54.85% of the two party preferred vote to halt Pettiona's attempted comeback. During the election campaign in 1961, a campaign meeting in Prahran that was attended by Premier Bolte and Loxton drew several hundred people and descended into chaos; heckling and some scuffles broke out. At this election, the Liberals' primary vote fell to 41.69% behind the Labor Party's candidate George Gahan 45.29%, and he had to rely on DLP preferences to retain the seat with a reduced two party preferred vote of 52.71%. The Liberals may have been hindered by a how-to-vote card circulated on election day by a third party that had a pro-Liberal headline, but instructed the reader to mark the ALP candidate as their first preference. Loxton managed to secure a court injunction—believed to be the first of its kind in Victoria—prohibiting further distribution of the material, but not before hundreds of misleading instructions had been disseminated.

In 1964, Loxton increased his primary vote to 45.77% and defeated Pettiona for the third time, ending with a fairly safe 57.72% after the distribution of preferences. In 1967, the retired cricketer repelled a political challenge by Jack Dyer, an iconic former footballer of the Richmond Tigers famed as one of the toughest players in history, and retained his seat at further elections in 1970, 1973 and 1976 before opting to retire at the 1979 poll. Without Loxton's personal appeal, the Liberals lost the seat to the ALP upon his departure. As he continued to play first-class cricket for three years after his election to parliament, he was a busy man, and teammates described him as a hard-working representative, recalling that he often brought his political paperwork to the ground with him, going through the material while waiting in the dressing room for his turn to bat. Although he was a low-key presence in the parliamentary chambers, Loxton served on the library committee from 1958 to 1961, and he was known for his work ethic and thorough approach, as well as his "sporting charisma".

== Cricket administration ==
Loxton continued to involve himself in cricket administration after his retirement as a player. He was a Victorian selector from 1957 to 1980–81 and the Prahran delegate to the Victorian Cricket Association (VCA) from 1955–56 to 1979–80. Loxton was Prahran's vice president and was involved in coaching and selecting teams, and his service to the club was honoured with life membership. He served as a MCG trustee from 1962 to 1982. The Victorian was appointed as the manager for Australia's tour of India in 1969–70 but had to withdraw due to a clash of commitments. In his absence, the campaign hit rocky waters. Although Australia won 3–1, the players became disgruntled with the arrangements made by the administrators, while rancorous incidents leading to crowd riots were frequent.

He was a Test selector for the Australian team from 1970 to 1981, filling the vacancy left by the retirement of former Test captain Ryder. Loxton's tenure on the selection panel coincided with a period of great upheaval in Australian cricket, on and off the field. Up until 1965, Australia had never lost a Test series to any country other than England, and their bilateral contests were regarded as the de facto world championship. However, in the next five years, Australia lost away to the West Indies 2–1, and to South Africa twice, 3–1 and 4–0 respectively. The former all-rounder became a selector after the whitewash in South Africa, joining Bradman and Harvey on the panel. During the 1970–71 home series against England, which Australia lost 2–1, the trio made a raft of changes, handing debuts to nine players, the largest number in a season since 1945–46 when competition resumed after World War II. One of the new players that Harvey and Loxton recommended to Bradman was Dennis Lillee, who went on to become one of Australia's greatest fast bowlers and the world's leading wicket-taker. However, the season ended acrimoniously when captain Bill Lawry was sacked before the final Test without being informed of his fate; he learned of his omission only second hand.

In 1977, Loxton helped to select David Hookes to make his debut in the Centenary Test, after receiving a recommendation from Bradman, who had retired from the panel. Hookes famously struck five consecutive fours in one Tony Greig over in an Australian win. The later period of Loxton's tenure was thrown into chaos when most of the leading players abandoned the existing establishment to sign contracts with the breakaway World Series Cricket—which offered substantially more remuneration—meaning that an almost-entirely new team had to be cobbled together; the 42-year-old Bob Simpson was brought out of a decade of retirement to lead the outfit. During this time, Australia's depleted team suffered many heavy defeats.

During the 1970s, Loxton also became more disillusioned with cricket, as player behaviour deteriorated, and altercations and verbal hostility became more frequent. The former all-rounder was known for his vigorous advocacy of the more sedate and gentlemanly conduct that existed during his playing days and felt that he and his fellow administrators were losing control of the sport.

In February 1981, matters came to a head. Loxton, who was watching a one-day international between Australia and New Zealand at the MCG in his role as a selector, broke down and wept after Australian captain Greg Chappell ordered his younger brother Trevor to exploit a loophole and bowl underarm to eliminate the chance of a defeat. Loxton saw the Australian skipper's action as a "betrayal" of cricket. He turned to a fellow official and remarked "The game's gone! Money has become the god and winning is everything."

At a VCA meeting in April 1981, Loxton announced that he was severing all connections with organised cricket. He initially said that he was resigning for family reasons, as he would be moving to the Gold Coast in Queensland with his wife. However, he proceeded to give a blunt 15-minute speech, claiming that he had lost the art of communicating with the players and expressing his disenchantment with some aspects of the game, a reference to the declining player conduct. After relocating to the Gold Coast, he was unable to turn his back on cricket, and umpired matches at local level into his 70s. Although he became severely visually impaired, Loxton still attended matches and asked his companions to describe the proceedings for him; ever opinionated and blunt, he still offered advice to local cricketers.

== Other work and personal life ==
Prior to entering politics, Loxton worked as a bank teller. In 1956, television began in Australia, and he participated in the nation's first generation of sports telecasting. Loxton was a commentator on GTV-9 for the Melbourne Summer Olympics held in late 1956, and his co-commentators included American track and field icon Jesse Owens. After leaving parliament, the former politician joined the property developers Ellis, Sallmann and Seward.

Loxton served as an administrator with various local groups. He was vice-president of the Victorian School for Deaf Children, president of the Prahran Technical School Council and a member of the Prahran College of Advanced Education Council. With regards to housing and social inclusion issues, he served as a committee member of the Glen Loch Home for the Aged and chairman of the Deakin Co-operative Housing Society.

His opinions on contemporary cricket were frequently sought. "People get a bit worried about me", he told Cricinfo in 2008, "Shane Warne's been a fine bowler—no doubt about it, he's done some wonderful things—but Bill O'Reilly and Clarrie Grimmett, who have better strike-rates per match than Warne and never played against a 2nd XI [a reference to the likes of Bangladesh and Zimbabwe]—they played only against the best—had no rough to bowl at. I never had to bat to a leg-spinner who bowled into the rough outside my leg stump, and I played for a long time."

Loxton married three times. He divorced his first wife Hilda in February 1952 after a nine-year union that produced no children. The cricketer then wed Caryl Bond, whom he had met during the 1949–50 tour of South Africa, and the pair had two sons. Loxton later divorced Bond and wed his third wife Joan Shiels. In 2000, one of his sons and his third wife died on the same day, due to a shark attack in Fiji and drowning in the family swimming pool, respectively. In later life he lived alone and was still mobile despite being almost blind. Loxton died on 3 December 2011.

== Test match performance ==
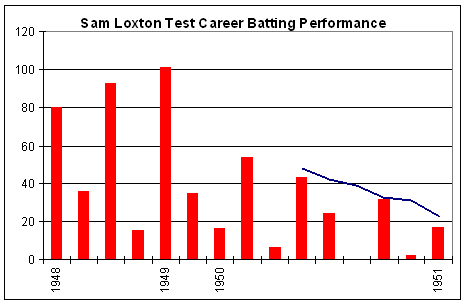
Sam Loxton's Test career batting performance. The red bars indicate the runs scored in a given innings. The blue line is the batting average of the last 10 innings.

		Batting				Bowling			
Opposition	Matches	Runs	Average	High Score	100 / 50	Runs	Wickets	Average	Best (Inns)
England	6	219	27.37	93	0/1	174	3	58.00	3/55
India	1	80	80.00	80	0/1	71	3	23.66	2/61
South Africa	5	255	42.50	101	1/1	104	2	51.00	1/7
Overall	12	554	36.93	101	1/3	349	8	43.62	3/5
