= Thomas Rush (disambiguation) =

Thomas Rush (1490–1560) was an English serjeant-at-arms who served Henry VII and Henry VIII.

Thomas Rush may also refer to:

- Thomas Rush (cricketer) (1874–1926), Australian cricketer
- Tom Rush (born 1941), American singer, songwriter and musician
- Tom Rush (1970 album)
