= Whitelaw =

Whitelaw may refer to:

== Places ==
- Whitelaw, Wisconsin, a village
- Whitelaw, Alberta, a hamlet in Canada

== Other ==
- Whitelaw (surname)
- Whitelaw Hotel, an historic building in Washington, DC
- Whitelaw Reid, American politician and newspaper editor
- Whitelaw Reid, American journalist
