= Arthur Pearce =

Australian rules footballer (1881–1902)

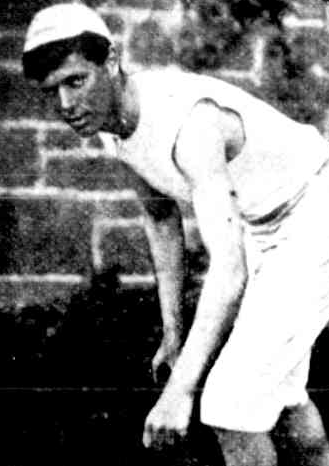

Personal information
- Full name: Arthur John Pearce
- Born: 1 January 1881; Bacchus Marsh, Victoria
- Died: 8 March 1902 (aged 21); St Kilda East, Victoria
- Original team: Wesley College
- Height: 179 cm (5 ft 10 in)
- Weight: 66 kg (146 lb)

Playing career^{1}
Years	Club	Games (Goals)
1900–1901	St Kilda	27 (6)
- ^{1} Playing statistics correct to the end of 1901.

Arthur John "Doc" Pearce (1 January 1881 – 8 March 1902) was an Australian rules footballer who played with St Kilda in the Victorian Football League (VFL).

== Biography ==
Born on 1 January 1881, Pearce was the youngest son of Mr Thos G. Pearce and Mrs M. J. Pearce, from Bacchus Marsh.

Pearce, known to everyone as "Doc", was educated at Wesley College where he was a leading schoolboy athlete. He was captain of the school's boats, cricket and football teams in the period from 1898 to 1900.

=== Athletics ===
Pearce won the Victorian Public Schools Mile Championship in 1900. His time remained Wesley College's one mile record for many years.

In January 1901 he won the one mile cross country race at a "Commonwealth Celebration" championship competition on the Sydney Cricket Ground, held to mark the proclamation of the Federation of Australia.

=== Football career ===
Pearce was one of five new players introduced by St Kilda in the opening round of the 1901 VFL season, a historic and controversial win over Melbourne at Junction Oval. Initially finishing as a draw, St Kilda lodged a protest as a behind scored by Melbourne's Dick Wardill had come after the three quarter time bell had sounded, which was not heard by the umpire. The protest was successful and St Kilda, after 48 losses, won for the first time in the VFL. Pearce was noted by The Argus as having played the best of all St Kilda players.

For the remainder of the season he was a regular fixture in the team and ended the year with a total of 15 appearances.

He played a further 12 games for St Kilda in the 1901 VFL season.

In August 1901 he was an emergency in the Victorian side which played an interstate match against South Australia in Adelaide.

=== Death ===
Pearce died at his home in East St Kilda of typhoid fever on 8 March 1902, aged 21.
