= Tony Atkins =

Australian medical doctor (born 1943)

Anthony Michael "Tony" Atkins AM (born 4 February 1943 in Elwood, Victoria) is an Australian medical doctor. He was awarded Member of the Order of Australia in 1987 in recognition of service to international relations, particularly in the field of famine relief and agricultural development in Africa.

== Early life and education ==
Atkins attended Elwood Central School and after receiving the Albert Jacka Scholarship, he completed his secondary education at Wesley College, Melbourne in 1959 aged sixteen. He then graduated MBBS, University of Melbourne, in 1965 and PhD, Monash University, in 1972, also completing Graduate Diploma in International Health, Monash University, 2002.

== Career ==
In 1966/67 he was Resident Medical Officer at the Alfred Hospital in Melbourne. From 1968 to 1974 he was employed at the Monash University Medical School. From 1973 to 1980 he served with the Africa Committee for the Rehabilitation of Southern Sudan in Juba and Darfur. Between 1980 and 1987 he worked for World Vision International, based in California and East Africa. Throughout this period he oversaw many major relief and rehabilitation programs in various countries. During the severe famine of 1984-85 in Ethiopia, Dr Atkins was Director of the relief program provided by World Vision International, based in Addis Ababa.

In recent years, Atkins has worked in Aboriginal Health Services in Western Australia and Queensland as well as a continuing role as a general medical practitioner in Berwick, Victoria.
