= Stuart Morris =

Australian judge

Stuart Morris KC is an Australian lawyer. He served as a Justice of the Supreme Court of Victoria and as President of the Victorian Civil and Administrative Tribunal (VCAT) from 2003 until 2007. Former Chairman of the Victorian Government's Local Government Commission, 1986 under the Cain Government. Stuart Morris worked as a barrister, and was one of Australia's leading lawyers in planning law. He was appointed a Queen's Counsel in 1991.

He is credited with having driven major improvements at VCAT. However, the position of VCAT President typically attracts criticism from some local municipalities unhappy with planning decisions.

He presided over some of the most famous cases to come before Australian courts in recent years, including the guardianship of the body of Maria Korp, granting access to Victorian Government legal advice to Heather Osland, and was the first Victorian judge to order planning authorities to take into account greenhouse pollution before extending coal mining licences.

He surprised many in the legal profession by resigning four years into his five-year term as President of VCAT. He has now returned to practice as a barrister at the Victorian Bar.

Morris holds a Bachelor of Laws and a Bachelor of Economics from Monash University. He was educated at Wesley College, Melbourne.
