= Chris Scalzo =

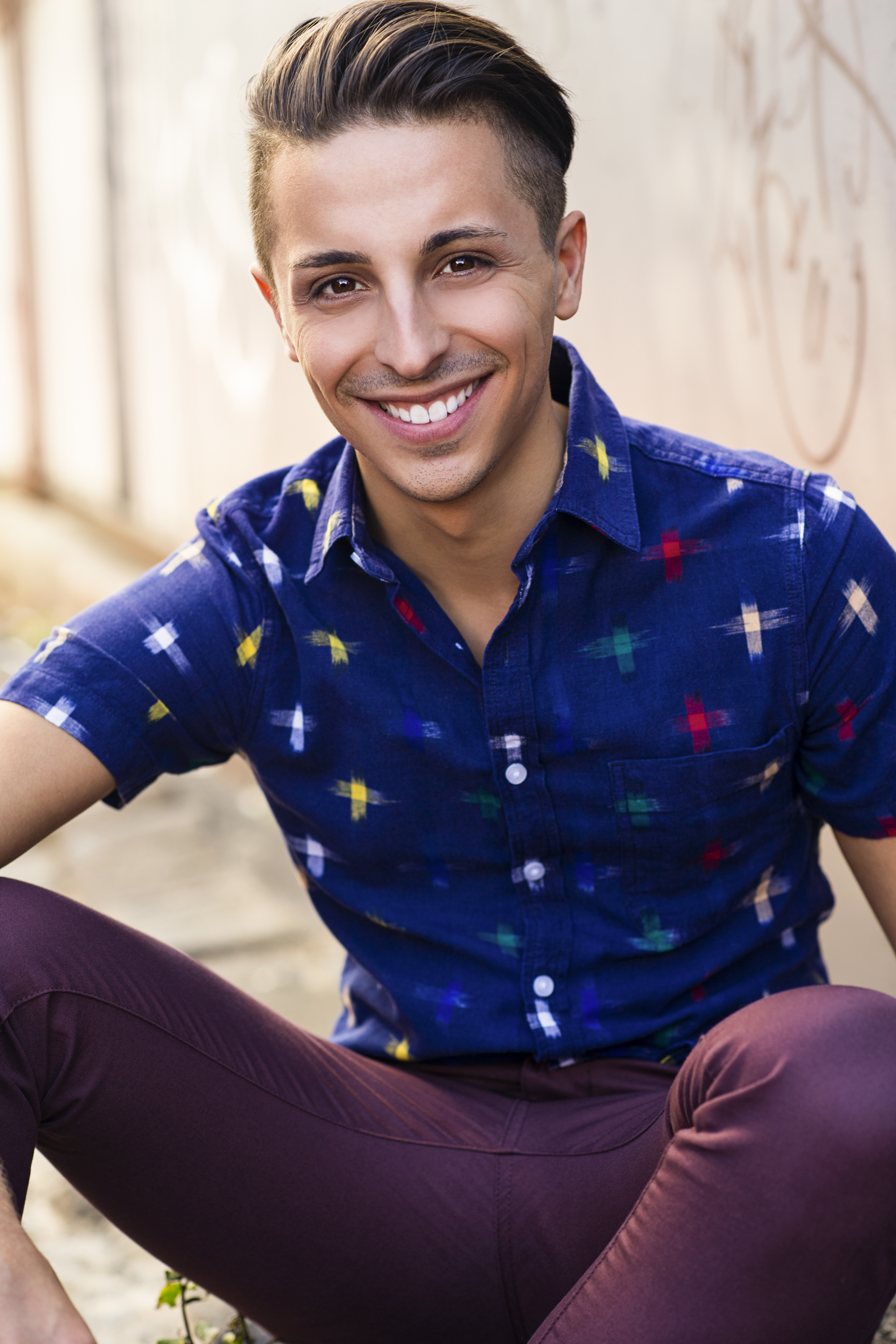

Background information
- Born: 13 March 1990 (age 36); Melbourne, Australia
- Genres: Musical theatre
- Occupations: Singer, actor
- Years active: 2015–present

Christopher Scalzo (born 13 March 1990) is an Australian-born actor, singer and musical theater performer. He has been part of many major national and international musicals.

In 2021, Scalzo was cast as Baby Doll in the Australian production of Moulin Rouge, directed by Alex Timbers and produced by Global Creatures. The production is set to open in September 2021 at the Regent Theatre, Melbourne. Scalzo was also cast in The Music of the Night alongside Debra Byrne showcasing the music of Andrew Lloyd Webber – a newly conceived concert production of Lloyd Webber's greatest hits, performed at Chapel Off Chapel.

2018 Australian Cast of Evita starring Tina Arena produced by Opera Australia at The Sydney Opera House. This production was a revival of the Original Broadway and Original West End Theatre Productions and was directed by Harold Prince, with music by Andrew Lloyd Webber and lyrics by Tim Rice.

2017 saw Scalzo touring Australia in Original Australian Cast of Green Day's American Idiot musical directed by Craig Illot.

In 2016, Scalzo performed at The Hayes Theatre in Sydney in the role of Man 1 in Jason Robert Brown's Songs for a New World. The production was directed by Luke Joslin, and also starred Cameron Macdonald, Sophie Carter and Teagan Wouters.

== Personal life ==
Born in Melbourne, Australia, Scalzo attended Wesley College and went on to study at The University of Melbourne. He left his studies at the university to accept at place at the NIDA (National Institute of Dramatic Art) in Sydney, Australia. He has also been a regular column writer on the Australian theatre website Aussie Theatre.

== Theatre ==
In 2015, Scalzo was cast in the role of Angel Dumott Schunard in RENT. The production was directed by Shaun Rennie and co-produced by The Hayes Theatre Company and Highway Run Productions. The critically acclaimed production played an extended season. RENT also starred Casey Donovan, Laura Bunting, Loren Hunter as Mimi and Linden Furnell and Roger. In 2016, RENT played a return season, again selling out. Scalzo reprised the role of Angel, with new cast members included Angelique Cassimatis as Mimi and Chloe Zuel as Joanne.

Scalzo also appeared in the international touring cast of the Tony Award-winning musical WICKED, The Untold Story of the Witches of Oz. Scalzo was heavily featured in the ensemble, as well as having understudied and performed the role of Boq.

Scalzo was also in the World premiere and Australian tour of the Des McAnuff-directed stage adaptation of Boris Pasternak's novel Doctor Zhivago, with a score by Lucy Simon.

In 2015, Scalzo was cast and set to appear in the Opera Australia/Gordon Frost Organization co-production of Jekyll & Hyde – The Musical starring Teddy Tahu Rhodes, Lucy Maunder and Jemma Rix. The production was postponed and its future remains uncertain.

His other stage credits include the international tour of Jekyll & Hyde which starred Brad Little in the title role, Opera Australia's The Pirates of Penzance starring Anthony Warlow as The Pirate King at the Sydney Opera House and Adam Guettel's Floyd Collins. He was the inspiration for a show based on a young boy triumphing over adversity and finding his voice through the power of his imagination in a play workshopped and staged at Monkey Baa Theatre in 2013 directed by Australian comedic actor Darren Gilshenan.

== Other performances ==
Scalzo has also worked in television on Australian shows Neighbours and Blue Heelers. He can be heard on numerous CDs and cast albums, including The Silver Donkey (Original Studio Cast Recording) and The Chaos Fairy (Original Cast Recording).
