= Andrew Dent =

Australian doctor and humanitarian worker

Prof Andrew Dent AM
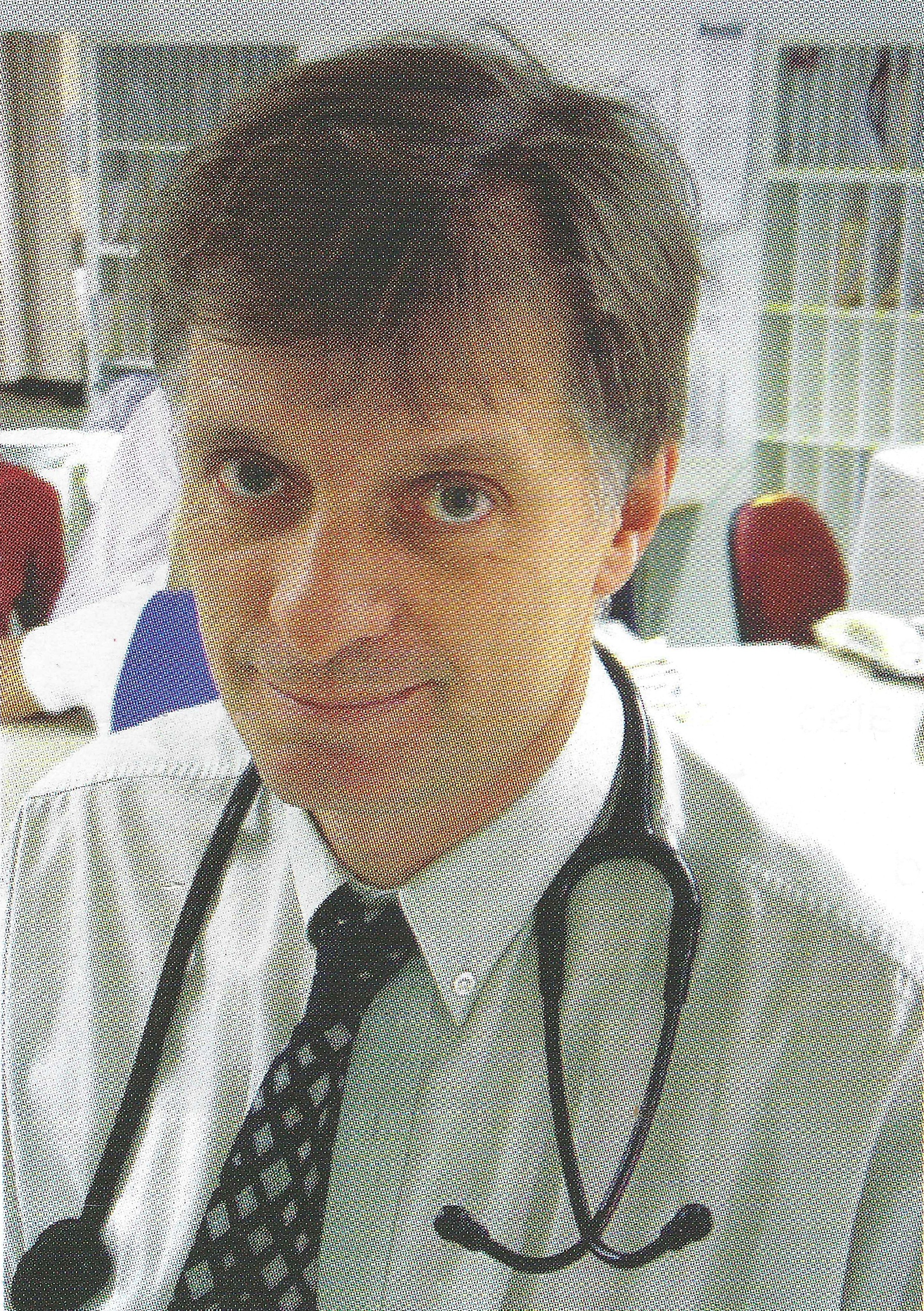
- Born: February 1, 1955; Warragul, Victoria, Australia
- Died: June 10, 2008 (aged 53); Melbourne, Victoria, Australia
- Known for: Humanitarian medical work
- Medical career
- Profession: Emergency Surgeon
- Institutions: St Vincent's Hospital, Melbourne
- Awards: Order of Australia

Andrew Wesley Dent AM (1 February 1955 – 10 June 2008) was an Australian doctor and humanitarian worker.

== Early life ==
Dent was born in Warragul, Victoria, and educated at Warragul High School and Wesley College, Melbourne, before being admitted to study Medicine at Melbourne University, initially at Queen's College.

== Career ==
Graduating in Medicine with first class honours in 1979, in 1980 Dent undertook a placement with Mother Teresa at the Missionaries of Charity in Calcutta, the commencement of a lifelong commitment to medical care in developing nations.

Dent completed his surgical training in the United Kingdom, being admitted to the Royal College of Surgeons in 1985. Following this, he spent many years at a mission hospital at Shishong in Cameroon, where he was the only qualified surgeon in a small team of doctors. He helped bring modern medical and surgical methods to a chronically under-resourced hospital, and his surgical training was invaluable in helping people in hundreds of local villages. His fundraising efforts help upgrade the very basic equipment, and he was the first doctor on-scene with medical aid at the 1986 Lake Nyos disaster, the eruption of a cloud of volcanic gases which killed almost 2000 people and sparked a major international aid effort.

Leaving Cameroon for the birth of his first son, Dent worked briefly in Australia before taking up a hospital role in Rabaul, New Guinea. His work on tropical medicine in New Guinea was cut short by the 1994 double volcanic eruption which almost completely destroyed the city. Although his wife and children were evacuated by the RAAF, Dent stayed on in New Guinea after the eruption, attending to the medical needs of many of the tens of thousands of displaced people.

Returning to Australia in 1995, he became a member of the Australasian College of Tropical Medicine, was admitted as a fellow of the Australasian College for Emergency Medicine and became Director of Emergency at St Vincent's Hospital, Melbourne.

At St Vincent's, he instituted wide-ranging changes, increasing the number of patients seen each year from 24,000 to over 40,000, ensuring a very low rate of ambulance by-pass, advocating for a specialist mental health emergency centre, establishing the Emergency Practice Innovation Centre, and helping ensure that emergency medical services were provided with "compassion, justice, and a respect for human dignity". He had a particular focus on ensuring that homeless people received good medical care.

Earning a master's degree in Public Health and appointed as an associate professor at Melbourne University, he published many dozens of research papers and developed practice manuals used globally. He was active in the development and education of young doctors in Australia and internationally.

Dent continued visiting New Guinea frequently, working for improved public health, particularly in the Southern Highlands and Gulf provinces. In order to ensure that this important public health work continued, he helped establish the Pacific Health Foundation. In 2008, Dent was admitted to the Order of the International Federation for Emergency Medicine.

Dent was diagnosed with cancer in June 2007. In 2008, his contributions were recognized with an Order of Australia on the Queen's Birthday, one day before his death.

== Personal life ==
Born one of five siblings, Dent met Blandine Janot (daughter of French constitutional lawyer and statesman Raymond Janot) while living as a guest worker on a kibbutz in Israel in 1977. They married in 1978, and had two sons. Dent joined the Catholic Church in 2007 and is interred at St Ignatius, Richmond, Victoria.
