= Arch Corbett =

Australian rules footballer

Personal information
- Full name: Archibald Gladstone Corbett
- Born: 18 October 1883; Fitzroy, Victoria
- Died: 25 June 1920 (aged 36) near Toulon, France
- Original team: Wesley College

Playing career^{1}
Years	Club	Games (Goals)
1912–1913	University	7 (0)
- ^{1} Playing statistics correct to the end of 1913.

Archibald Gladstone Corbett (18 October 1883 – 25 June 1920) was an Australian rules footballer who played for the University Football Club in the Victorian Football League.

== Family ==
The son of Charles William Corbett (1852–1915), and Emma Corbett (1851–1897), née Foyle, Archibald Gladstone Corbett was born on 18 August 1883.

He was lost overboard on 25 June 1920 while travelling back to Australia following his service in the First AIF.

== Education ==
He attended Wesley College, Melbourne; and, on leaving school, he worked with his older brother, Charles William Corbett (1876–1947), for the Australian Mutual Provident Society for ten years.

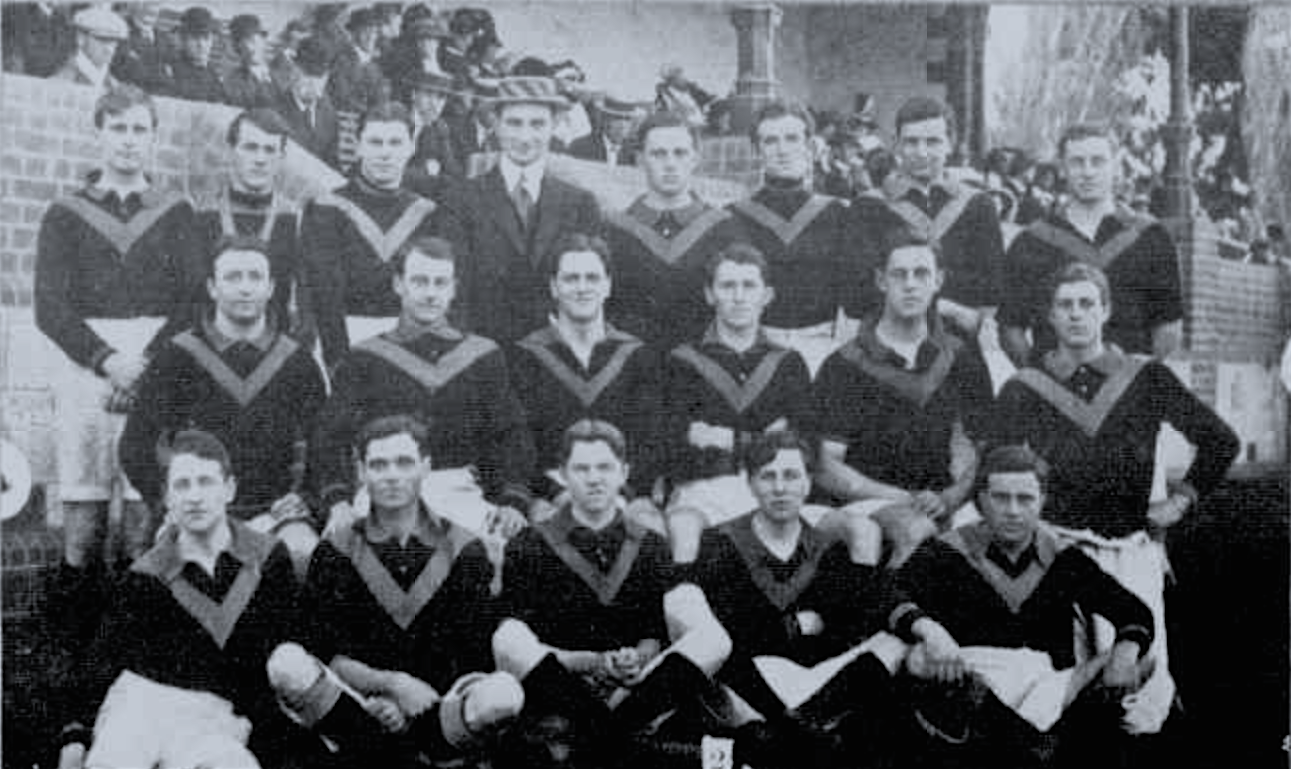
Melbourne University's's football team for the annual (inter-varsity) match against University of Adelaide, played in Adelaide on 12 August 1914 (Corbett is at the far left of second row).

At the age of 28, he enrolled in medicine at University of Melbourne, and entered Ormond College, graduating Bachelor of Medicine, Bachelor of Surgery (M.B.B.S.) in September 1917.

== Football ==
While at Ormond, he was a prominent footballer. He played with the university's team in the Metropolitan Amateur Football Association; and, as well, he played seven senior games with the university's team in the VFL competition: four games in 1912 (rounds 5, 6, 7, and 8), and three games in 1913 (rounds 2, 15, and 17).

He was a member of the university's inter-state team in 1914; and was awarded a blue for football.

== Rowing ==
He was also an oarsman.

== Military ==
Enlisting in the First A.I.F. immediately on graduating, at the age of 34, he served as a medical officer during World War I with the Australian Army Medical Corps (A.A.M.C.), and remained in England after the war to work in London hospitals.

== Death ==
He died at sea in 1920 after "disappearing" from his cabin on the night of 25/26 June 1920 – he was last seen around 12:30 in the early morning of 26 June 1920, near the coast of Toulon – while returning to Australia from England on the RMS Orontes.

According to the documents contained within his Service Record, and a search of the ship revealed that no trace of him was found. On the basis of the evidence given to the military Court of Inquiry conducted on 26 June 1920 – by five witnesses, two of whom had known him at Melbourne University – combined with the contents of a note left at the head of his bed, the concluded three things:

(a) he had been seen, alive and in person, on the vessel on the previous evening;
(b) a thorough search had revealed that he was no longer on the vessel,
(c) that he was dead, and nothing else.

Documents contained within his Service Record (p. 60) show that the Officer-in-Charge of Base Records of the Defence Department, one Major J. M. Lean, as part of the routine bureaucratic process, submitted the following (on 6 August 1920) to his superiors:

"The evidence discloses that Captain A.G. Corbett, A.A.M.C., disappeared from the transport "Orontes" on the night of the 25th./26th. June 1920, when that vessel was at sea, 130 miles from Toulon, France, so he can only reasonably be presumed to have thrown himself overboard —this is borne out by the letter he left before disappearing – and is dead.
Recommend that he be recorded as "drowned at sea – suicide".

The superior officer to whom Major Lean's (idiosyncratic and unsubstantiated by any of the documentary evidence) version of the Court's findings were referred was Brigadier General Cecil Henry Foott, the Deputy Adjutant General. Foott approved the findings, with the single, hand-written proviso that Corbett's death was "to be recorded as drowned at sea", dated 12 August 1920 (at p. 60; and at p. 92 "suicide" has been crossed out, with the annotation "Deleted D.A.G. ruling").

== See also ==
- List of Victorian Football League players who died on active service
