= Edward Rush (cricketer) =

Australian cricketer

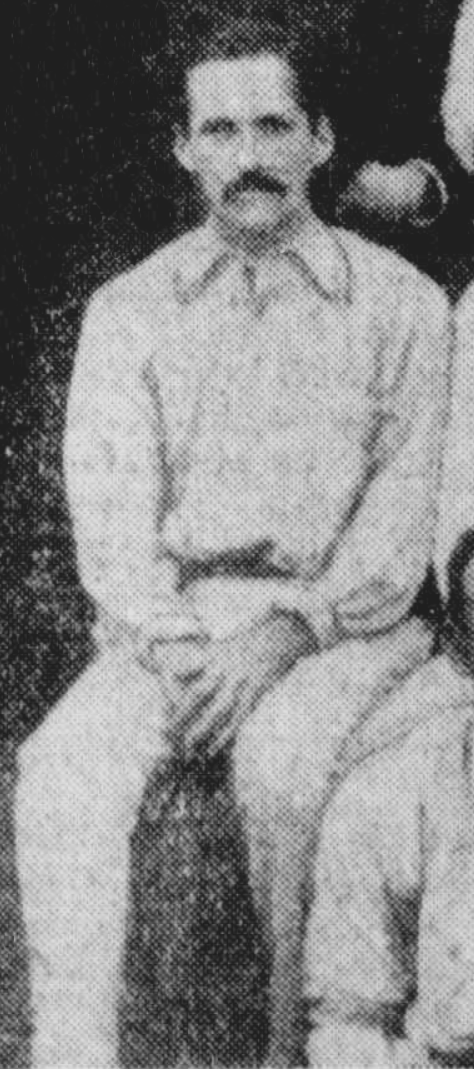

Personal information
- Born: 29 March 1868; Melbourne, Australia
- Died: 6 May 1936 (aged 68); Melbourne, Australia

Domestic team information
- Years: Team
- 1897-1898: Victoria
- Source: Cricinfo, 26 July 2015

Edward Rush (29 March 1868 – 6 May 1936) was an Australian cricketer. He played three first-class cricket matches for Victoria between 1897 and 1898. His brother, Thomas, also played for Victoria.

Rush began his cricket career while attending Wesley College and became captain of the College cricket team in 1883. In district cricket he played for the Hawksburn Cricket Club which became Prahran and he was named a life member of the Prahran Cricket Club.

In his professional career Rush was a grain broker. In his personal life he attended Glendeargrove Methodist Church in Malvern, serving as a trustee of the Church, and he had seven sons.

== See also ==
- List of Victoria first-class cricketers
