= Chris Silagy =

Australian academic (1960 – 2001)

Christopher Allen Silagy AO (14 September 1960 – 13 December 2001) was an advocate of evidence-based medicine and an evaluator of health care programs. He was Professor of Public Health and Foundation Director of the Monash Institute of Health Services Research at Monash Medical School and he was also founder of the Australasian Cochrane Centre.

Silagy was the son of Hungarian-born parents and went to school at Wesley College, Melbourne, where he was involved in debating, dramatic productions, and served as editor of the School Magazine in 1977. He then studied medicine at the University of Melbourne. During this time he was also actively involved within the Scout Association of Australia, later becoming a Commissioner. Silagy spent two years at Oxford University as Sir Robert Menzies Memorial Scholar in medicine before returning to Australia in 1993 to take up the foundation chair of general practice at Flinders University at the age of 33. He was actively involved in supporting the development of the Cochrane Collaboration both in Australia (where he was director of the Australasian Cochrane Centre from 1994 to 2001) and internationally (where he was chair of the international steering group from 1996 to 1998).

In the 2000 Queen's Birthday honours list he was made an Officer in the Order of Australia for service to medicine, particularly in the areas of research and education, and in developments in the field of evidence-based medicine.

Silagy died at the age of 41 of Non-Hodgkin lymphoma leaving his wife – Jane, and four children – Andrew, Michael, Nicholas and Benjamin. The Medical Journal of Australia published his self-written obituary.
