= John Whitelaw (general, born 1894) =

Australian general (1894–1964)

John Stewart Whitelaw
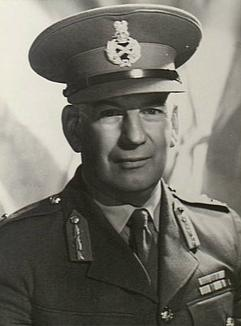
- Portrait of Whitelaw taken in 1944
- Born: 26 August 1894; Hawthorn, Victoria
- Died: 21 April 1964 (aged 69); Berwick, Victoria
- Relatives: John Whitelaw (son)
- Military career
- Allegiance: Australia
- Branch: Australian Army
- Service years: 1911–1951
- Rank: Major General
- Commands: Western Command (1946–51); 5th Military District (1946–51); Victoria Lines of Communication Area (1945–46); Coast Defences, Eastern Command (1939–42)
- Conflicts: First World War; Second World War
- Awards: Companion of the Order of the Bath; Commander of the Order of the British Empire
- Other work: Colonel Commandant, Royal Australian Artillery (1955–61)

Major General John Stewart Whitelaw, CB, CBE (26 August 1894 – 21 April 1964) was a senior officer in the Australian Army. Whitelaw was a graduate of the first intake of the Royal Military College, Duntroon and served briefly at Gallipoli with an infantry battalion during the First World War. His war service was, however, cut short by a bullet wound suffered during the landing on 25 April 1915 and he returned to Australia where, during the interwar years, he transferred to the artillery and undertook a number of staff and instructional postings. During the Second World War, although he did not serve overseas in an operational role, in his capacity as a senior artillery officer Whitelaw had responsibility for all matters relating to the development of artillery in the Australian Army and in this role he championed the introduction of new technologies and weaponry into the corps and the development of Australian defence industries.

Following the end of hostilities Whitelaw served as general officer commanding of the Army's Western Command as well presiding over the war crimes tribunals held at Rabaul, New Guinea in 1947. He retired from the military in 1951 with a number of high honours, nevertheless he continued his links with the Army and in 1955 he accepted the ceremonial role of Colonel Commandant of the Royal Australian Artillery, a post he held until 1961. He died in 1964, aged 69.

== Early life ==
Whitelaw was born on 26 August 1894 at Hawthorn, Victoria. He was oldest of three children, born to ironmonger Thomas Whitelaw and his wife Margaret (née Hunter). In his formative years he attended Wesley College before being accepted into the first intake of the newly established Royal Military College, Duntroon where he undertook training to be commissioned as an officer in the Australian Army.

== Military career ==
=== First World War ===
The outbreak of the First World War interrupted Whitelaw's studies at the college before he could complete the full four-year course as the Army decided to graduate the first class early so that they could be sent over to the Middle East with the Australian Imperial Force that was being raised for overseas service. As a result, shortly after the declaration of war Whitelaw was commissioned as a lieutenant in the AIF and posted to the 7th Battalion, a volunteer infantry unit being raised in Melbourne.

After only a short period of training, Whitelaw departed Australia on the transport Hororata on 19 October 1914 along with the first contingent of Australians bound for Egypt, arriving there in December 1914. On 25 April 1915 the battalion took part in the Landing at Anzac Cove as part of the second wave. Whitelaw disembarked with the battalion's machine gun section, but his time ashore was cut short when as he was evacuated later that day with a bullet wound to his foot. He spent a number of months recuperating in Egypt and in the United Kingdom before being repatriated to Australia in November 1915 whereupon his service in the AIF ceased and he returned to the Permanent Force, assigned to an administrative and instructional role in the 3rd Military District (Victoria).

In late 1917 Whitelaw had transferred to the Royal Australian Garrison Artillery, which had responsibility for all coastal artillery batteries around Australia. Undertaking various staff and regimental appointments he served in this capacity until the end of the war, seeing no further overseas service.

=== Inter war years ===
In October 1920 Whitelaw was transferred to the Staff Corps with the rank of captain. Following this he undertook further artillery officers' training at the School of Gunnery before taking a post there as an instructor in 1927. An appointment to the United Kingdom followed next, lasting from 1928 until early 1931 when he returned to Australia to take up the post of chief instructor at the School of Artillery, marching-in in January. In October he received news of his promotion to major. In July 1937 he was promoted again, this time to lieutenant colonel following a stint on the general staff at Army Headquarters in Melbourne.

=== Second World War ===
Whitelaw was promoted to colonel a month after the outbreak of the Second World War and took on the important role of the commander of all coastal defences in New South Wales. During this time he championed the transfer of technologies such as radar from the United Kingdom and advocated their development in Australia. During this time he undertook a couple of overseas study tours in his official capacity, first to the Netherlands East Indies and then to Singapore to investigate the development of coastal artillery in Allied forces. In 1941, while serving as the aide-de-camp to Alexander Hore-Ruthven, 1st Earl of Gowrie in his capacity of governor general, Whitelaw received a temporary promotion to brigadier and the following year was invested as a Commander of the Order of the British Empire.

In April 1942 he was promoted to the rank of major general and posted to Land Headquarters in Melbourne where he was placed in charge of all artillery matters in the Australian Army, a task that encompassed a multitude of responsibilities including dealing with issues of supply to forward artillery units serving in the South West Pacific Area and the development of new weapons such as the Ordnance QF 25-pounder Short, which was designed specifically for the harsh conditions that the Army faced in the jungles of New Guinea and elsewhere. Late in the war, Whitelaw took command of all support units in Victoria as General Officer Commanding Victoria Lines of Communication Area.

=== Postwar career ===
In early 1946, after the end of hostilities, Whitelaw took over responsibility for Western Command, with his headquarters in Perth, Western Australia. The following year he served as president to the Rabaul war crimes tribunal which heard allegations of mistreatment of Australian prisoners of war by the Japanese during the war. In June 1947 he returned to Australia and resumed his duties in Perth until his retirement from the military on 27 August 1951. For his contributions to the Army in his 40 years of service, Whitelaw was invested as a Companion of the Order of the Bath.

== Retirement ==
In his retirement Whitelaw undertook volunteer work with Legacy, a charitable organisation that cares for the dependents of deceased servicemen and women, and also the Victorian Country Fire Authority. Living in Upper Beaconsfield, Victoria he kept himself active through attending church and pursuing his interests in gardening, history and carpentry. But he was a gunner at heart and in 1955 he was offered the role of Colonel Commandant of the Royal Australian Artillery. He accepted and held this post until 1961. On 21 April 1964 he died of a heart attack while at Berwick, Victoria. He was 69 years of age and left behind his wife, Esther, and their three sons.

== Family ==
On 27 December 1915 he married Esther August Norman at St Mark's, Camberwell, Victoria. They had three sons, Fred, John, and Norman, all of whom followed in their father's footsteps and pursued careers as artillery officers in the Australian Army.

=== Price Stewart (Norman) ===
Major Price Stewart (Norman) Whitelaw, ED (born 1918), served in the Second World War with the 2/2nd Field Regiment. He married in January 1943, and was President of the Royal Australian Artillery Association (Victoria) Inc. from 1984 to 1987.

=== Frederick Thomas ===
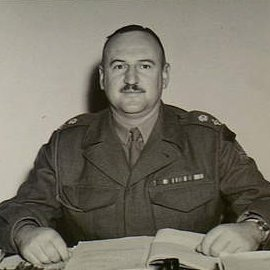
Fred Whitelaw in Japan, 1951

Brigadier Frederick Thomas (Fred) Whitelaw, CBE, (born 1919) entered the Royal Military College, Duntroon in 1937 and graduated in 1940. By the end of the war, he was in command of the 53rd Anti-Aircraft Regiment (Heavy). In 1951, Lieutenant Colonel Whitelaw was General Staff Officer Grade 1 in the British Commonwealth Occupation Force in Kure, Japan, returning to Australia with his wife and son in April 1952. In 1961, Colonel Whitelaw was commander of the Royal Tasmania Regiment. After a period as Commander of the Australian Army Force, Far East Land Forces, in November 1971 Brigadier Whitelaw became ANZUK commander in Singapore. On completion of his 2-year term, he returned to a staff appointment at Army Headquarters in Canberra.

=== John ===
Major General John Whitelaw, AO, CBE (1921–2010) enlisted in the Militia in 1939 and served in New Guinea and Bouganville during the Second World War. When the Citizen Military Force (CMF) was restructured, Captain Whitelaw returned to the Active List with Headquarters Western Command on 4 July 1948. He applied for a commission in the Interim Army, and on 1 July 1949 began a full-time army career which consumed him for the next 29 years during which he rose to become a major general and Deputy Chief of the General Staff.
