= Frank Boynton (footballer) =

Australian rules footballer (1887–1946)

Personal information
- Full name: Frank Audley Henry Boynton
- Born: 1 January 1887; Prahran, Victoria
- Died: 3 March 1946 (aged 59); Northam, Western Australia
- Original team: Wesley College

Playing career^{1}
Years	Club	Games (Goals)
1906	Melbourne	1 (0)
1907	Geelong	13 (2)
1908–10	University	25 (12)
Total		39 (14)
- ^{1} Playing statistics correct to the end of 1910.

Frank Audley Henry Boynton (1 January 1887 – 3 March 1946) was an Australian rules footballer who played with Melbourne, Geelong and University in the Victorian Football League (VFL).

Boynton was born in Prahran, Victoria, the eldest child of Thomas Henry Boynton and Agnes Amelia Dawes. The family lived in Balranald where Boynton and Dawes was a major grocery shop. He was educated at Wesley College, Melbourne, where he was a prefect and champion athlete, cricketer, footballer and rower. He was a notable athlete while studying medicine at the University of Melbourne, being awarded four sporting blues and playing VFL football for five seasons. After one game with Melbourne in 1906, he played most games in Geelong's 1907 season. He then played intermittently for University during their first three seasons in the VFL.

Boynton left Melbourne to continue to study medicine in Adelaide but did not finish the course. He later moved to Perth where he sold farm machinery. In 1925 he married Mary Elizabeth Smith and they lived in Northam, Western Australia until his death in 1946.
