= Ross Gregory =

Australian cricketer (1916 – 1942)

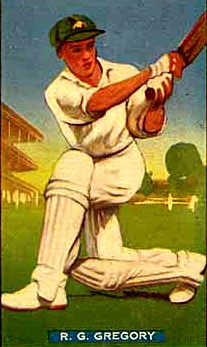

Personal information
- Full name: Ross Gerald Gregory
- Born: 27 February 1916; Malvern, Victoria, Australia
- Died: 10 June 1942 (aged 26); Gaffargaon, Bengal, British India
- Batting: Right-handed
- Bowling: Right-arm legbreak
- Role: Batsman

International information
- National side: Australia
- Test debut (cap 159): 29 January 1937 v England
- Last Test: 3 March 1937 v England

Domestic team information
- Years: Team
- 1933/34–1938/39: Victoria

Career statistics
Competition	Test	First-class
Matches	2	24
Runs scored	153	1,874
Batting average	51.00	38.24
100s/50s	0/2	1/17
Top score	80	128
Balls bowled	24	3,709
Wickets	0	50
Bowling average	–	35.34
5 wickets in innings	–	1
10 wickets in match	–	0
Best bowling	–	5/69
Catches/stumpings	1/–	20/–
- Source: CricketArchive, 3 August 2009

Ross Gerald Gregory (27 February 1916 – 10 June 1942) was an Australian Test cricketer.

Gregory, a diminutive gifted right-hand batsman, was a precocious batting talent, making his debut for Victoria while still at school and his Test cricket debut before the age of 21 in the 1936–37 season, after scoring 128 for his state against Gubby Allen's MCC tourists. Although this was his only first-class century, he scored 17 fifties in his 33 games and took 50 wickets with his leg breaks and googlies. He compiled 23, 50 and 80 in his three Test innings, making a major contribution as Australia came back from 2–0 down to win the Ashes 3–2.

During the Second World War, Gregory enlisted in the Royal Australian Air Force and attained the rank of Pilot Officer. He was killed in action near the town of Gaffargaon, East Bengal (now Bangladesh) in 1942 (aged 26) when his bomber crashed on operations to bomb Japanese in Burma.

Born in Malvern, a suburb of Melbourne, he was educated at Wesley College, Melbourne.
