= John Whitelaw (general, born 1921) =

Australian general (1921–2010)

- Born: 11 June 1921; Hawthorn, Victoria
- Died: 18 June 2010 (aged 89); Canberra, Australian Capital Territory
- Relatives: Major General John Whitelaw (father)
- Military career
- Allegiance: Australia
- Branch: Australian Army
- Service years: 1939–1978
- Rank: Major General
- Commands: Deputy Chief of the General Staff (1977–78)
- Conflicts: Second World War; Indonesia–Malaysia confrontation Vietnam War
- Awards: Officer of the Order of Australia; Commander of the Order of the British Empire; Mentioned in Despatches; Bronze Star Medal (United States)

Note that his father was also Major General John Whitelaw

Major General John Whitelaw, AO, CBE (11 June 1921 – 18 June 2010) was a career officer in the Australian Army who rose to the position of Deputy Chief of the General Staff (1977–78). Joining the army in mid-1939, as a part-time soldier in the Royal Australian Artillery, Whitelaw was later commissioned and served in the Second Australian Imperial Force during the Second World War, seeing action in New Guinea and Bougainville. After the war, he briefly returned to a career as a clerk, before taking up a Regular Army commission in the post war years, which saw him rise to the rank of major general. In retirement he was active on many councils and committees.

== Early years ==
Whitelaw was born on 11 June 1921 in Hawthorn, Victoria, into the military family of Major General John Whitelaw and his wife Esther Augusta née Norman. His brothers Frederick Thomas and Price Stewart (Norman) also served as artillery officers, Frederick as a brigadier and Price as a major. Whitelaw attended schools in both rural and urban Victoria and from an early age displayed a penchant for mathematics. He attended Sydney Boys High School and Wesley College, Melbourne. In 1937, he commenced working as an indentured clerk with the paper merchants Spicers & Detmold Ltd in Melbourne.

== Military service ==
=== Second World War ===
Having served in the cadets as a youth, following his 18th birthday, Whitelaw enlisted in the Militia – Australia's part-time military force – on 11 June 1939. Assigned to the Royal Australian Artillery, he was posted to the 10th Field Brigade, Royal Australian Artillery. He was rapidly promoted, rising to the rank of sergeant within a year. Based on his abilities and education, he was appointed provisionally as a lieutenant on 15 March 1940, and subsequently undertook full-time duty from 1 May 1940 to 25 September 1941, when he transferred to the Second Australian Imperial Force (2nd AIF).

Whitelaw was subsequently posted to the 2/1st Field Regiment, and then later the 4th Field Regiment, seeing active service in New Guinea and Bougainville. Promoted to captain, he was wounded in action on Bougainville; however, he remained on duty and subsequently earned a mention in despatches on 6 June 1945 while serving as an artillery forward observer during an amphibious assault at Porton Plantation to cut off the withdrawing Japanese.

=== Interbellum and senior command ===
Following the cessation of hostilities, Whitelaw undertook a posting with a movements control unit based around Rabaul, until September 1946 when Whitelaw's commission in the 2nd AIF was terminated and he returned to his job with Spicers in Melbourne. In December 1947, he married Nancy Bogle, and in 1948 he was transferred to Perth. The same year, Australia's part-time military forces were re-raised under the title of the Citizen Military Force, and Whitelaw was appointed to Headquarters Western Command in July 1948 after returning to full-time service.

Whitelaw subsequently served in a range of staff positions until his first regimental posting as adjutant of the 1st Field Regiment at Georges Heights in Sydney. In 1955, Whitelaw, then a major, moved with his wife, Nancy and their three young daughters to the Canadian Staff College at Kingston. He was subsequently appointed as the Exchange Instructor in Canada for the following two years.

Whitelaw continued to serve in various staff positions, which included: Headquarters Australian Army Force, Far East Land Force in Singapore in 1966 as the assistant adjutant and quartermaster general, and later as deputy commander. He was subsequently posted to Army Headquarters, Canberra as Director Equipment Policy in 1968.

Promoted to colonel in 1970, Whitelaw was appointed the Chief of Staff at Headquarters Australian Army Forces Vietnam. For his achievements in this role he was later appointed a Commander of the Order of the British Empire in September 1971, and awarded the United States Bronze Star Medal.

After returning to Australia in 1971 Whitelaw was promoted to brigadier and was appointed Director Military Operations and Plans. Following promotion to major general his postings included Chief of Operations and Chief of Personnel. In 1977, Whitelaw assumed the position of Deputy Chief of the General Staff (DCGS) and in June that year was appointed as an Officer of the Order of Australia. He served as DCGS until his retirement in 1978.

== Retirement ==
In retirement, Whitelaw and his wife continued to reside in Canberra. He subsequently worked on the Council of the National Heart Foundation, as the founding executive director of the National Farmers' Federation and finally with Greening Australia. Meanwhile, he also maintained close ties with veteran and Service organisations, serving as national president of the Regular Defence Force Welfare Association and vice-president of the Australian Veterans and Defence Services Council. He also served as Colonel Commandant of the Royal Regiment of Australian Artillery in New South Wales from 1978 to 1984.

Whitelaw died on 18 June 2010. A military funeral was held at the Anzac Memorial Chapel, Duntroon. He was survived by his wife, their three daughters, and grandchildren.
