= Thomas Rush (cricketer) =

Australian cricketer

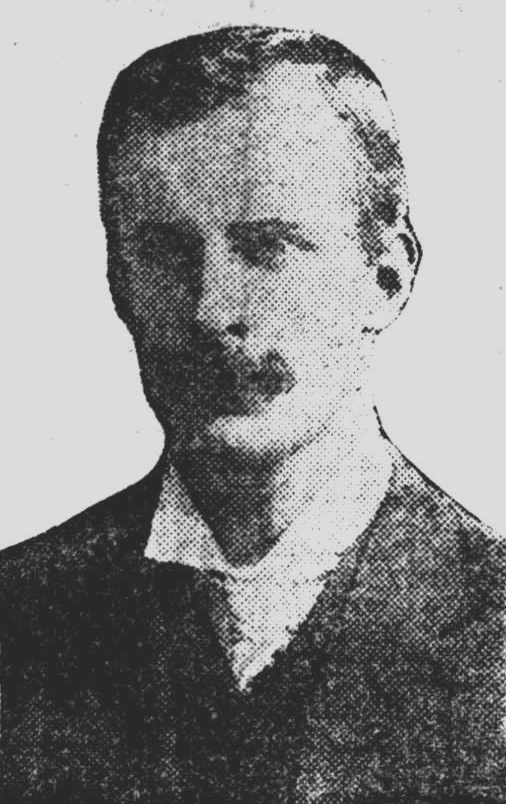

Personal information
- Born: 7 December 1874; Melbourne, Australia
- Died: 29 October 1926 (aged 51); Melbourne, Australia

Domestic team information
- Years: Team
- 1906-1908: Victoria
- Source: Cricinfo, 15 November 2015

Thomas Rush (7 December 1874 – 29 October 1926) was an Australian cricketer. He played eight first-class cricket matches for Victoria between 1906 and 1908. His brother, Edward, also played for Victoria.

== See also ==
- List of Victoria first-class cricketers
