= International cricket in 1947–48 =

International cricket season

The 1947–48 international cricket season was from September 1947 to April 1948.

== Season overview ==
International tours
Start date	Home team	Away team	Results [Matches]			
Start date	Home team	Away team	Test	ODI	FC	LA
28 November 1947	Australia	India	4–0 [5]	—	—	—
21 January 1948	West Indies	England	2–0 [4]	—	—	—
13 March 1948	New Zealand	Fiji	—	—	1–0 [1]	—
27 March 1948	Ceylon	Australia	—	—	—	0–0 [1]
16 April 1949	Ceylon	India	—	—	0–0 [1]	—

== November ==
=== India in Australia ===
Test series
No.	Date	Home captain	Away captain	Venue	Result
Test 290	28 Nov–4 December	Donald Bradman	Lala Amarnath	The Gabba, Brisbane	Australia by an innings and 226 runs
Test 291	12–18 December	Donald Bradman	Lala Amarnath	Sydney Cricket Ground, Sydney	Match drawn
Test 292	1–5 January	Donald Bradman	Lala Amarnath	Melbourne Cricket Ground, Melbourne	Australia by 233 runs
Test 294	23–28 January	Donald Bradman	Lala Amarnath	Adelaide Oval, Adelaide	Australia by an innings and 16 runs
Test 295	6–10 February	Donald Bradman	Lala Amarnath	Melbourne Cricket Ground, Melbourne	Australia by an innings and 177 runs

== January ==
=== England in the West Indies ===
Test Series
No.	Date	Home captain	Away captain	Venue	Result
Test 293	21–26 January	George Headley	Ken Cranston	Kensington Oval, Bridgetown	Match drawn
Test 296	11–16 February	Gerry Gomez	Gubby Allen	Queen's Park Oval, Port of Spain	Match drawn
Test 297	3–6 March	John Goddard	Gubby Allen	Bourda, Georgetown	West Indies by 7 wickets
Test 298	27 Mar–1 April	John Goddard	Gubby Allen	Sabina Park, Kingston	West Indies by 10 wickets

== March ==
=== Fiji in New Zealand ===
First-class Match
No.	Date	Home captain	Away captain	Venue	Result
FC Match	13–16 March	Lankford Smith	Philip Snow	Carisbrook, Dunedin	Otago by 46 runs

=== Australia in Ceylon ===
One-day Match
No.	Date	Home captain	Away captain	Venue	Result
Match	27 March	Mahadevan Sathasivam	Donald Bradman	Colombo Cricket Club Ground, Colombo	Match drawn

== April ==
=== India in Ceylon ===
Three-day Match
No.	Date	Home captain	Away captain	Venue	Result
Match	16–18 March	Mahadevan Sathasivam	C. K. Nayudu	P Saravanamuttu Stadium, Colombo	Match drawn
