= Whitelaw (surname) =

Whitelaw is a surname. Notable people with the surname include:

- Alexander Whitelaw (1823–1879), Scottish Conservative MP
- Billie Whitelaw, actress
- David Whitelaw, writer
- Graeme Whitelaw, politician
- Paul Whitelaw, cricketer
- Reid Whitelaw, American music producer and songwriter
- Sonny Whitelaw, novelist, photographer and freelance journalist
- Vicki Whitelaw (born 1977), Australian road cyclist
- William Whitelaw, 1st Viscount Whitelaw, politician
