= Wesley College, Melbourne =

Independent school in Victoria, Australia

Wesley College

Location
- Melbourne, Victoria; Australia; 37°50′57″S 144°58′55″E

Information
- Type: private school, co-educational, day & boarding school
- Motto: Latin: Sapere Aude (Dare To Be Wise)
- Denomination: Uniting Church
- Established: 11 January 1866
- Principal: Nicholas Evans
- Chaplain: Rev. Peter Burnham
- Staff: 564 (full-time)
- Gender: Co-educational
- Enrolment: 3,370 (K–12) (2018)
- Campuses: St Kilda Road; Glen Waverley; Elsternwick
- Colours: Purple and gold
- Slogan: A True Education (2010–present)
- Affiliations: Associated Public Schools of Victoria; Independent Primary School Heads of Australia
- Alumni: Old Wesley Collegians
- Website: www.wesleycollege.edu.au

Wesley College is a co-educational, open-entry private school in Melbourne, Australia. Established in 1866, the college is the only school in Victoria to offer the International Baccalaureate (IB) from early childhood to Year 12.

The college consists of three main metropolitan campuses in Melbourne, St Kilda Road, Glen Waverley and Elsternwick, residential/boarding facilities (Glen Waverley), three outdoor education sites (Mallana, Chum Creek, & Lochend), a year 9 residential learning campus in Clunes and the Yiramalay/Wesley Studio School (Yiramalay) in the Kimberley Region.

Wesley was the first registered school in Australia and is a founding member of the Associated Public Schools of Victoria (APS). It is affiliated with the Independent Primary School Heads of Australia, the Association of Independent Schools of Victoria, the Association of Heads of Independent Schools of Australia and the Headmasters' and Headmistresses' Conference.

== Overview ==
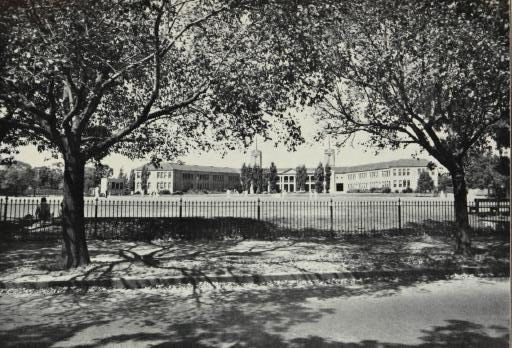
St Kilda Road Campus (1930s)

Wesley College operates in a three mini-school structure (Junior, Middle & Senior Schools), which caters for students from early childhood through to Year 12. In the Junior Schools (3 Year olds to Year 4), students from the Early Childhood Learning Centre to Year 4 are taught within the framework of the IB Primary Years Programme (PYP). In Middle School (Year 5 to Year 9), students continue to learn within the framework of the IB Primary Years Programme before transitioning into the IB Middle Years Programme (MYP) in Year 7. In the Senior Schools (Years 11 to 12), Wesley offers the Victorian Certificate of Education, IB Diploma Programme and Vocational Education and Training.

Wesley enrolment is not subject to entrance examinations or other requirements although some preference is given to female students in order to achieve gender balance. A report in 2019 cited Wesley's fees as among the highest of any school in Victoria.

== Campuses ==
=== St Kilda Road ===
Established in 1866, the St Kilda Road campus has approximately 1,500 students from early childhood through to Year 11. The campus is around four kilometres from the Melbourne city centre. The campus comprises two sites, with the Middle and Senior Schools located on St Kilda Road and the Junior School in close proximity to High Street and St Kilda Road.

=== Glen Waverley ===
The Glen Waverley campus, established in 1966, has over 1,200 students from early childhood through to Year 12. The campus is home to Wesley's boarding facility.

In 2012, parts of the Middle School were burned down during a fire, which led to the construction of the new Drennen centre.

=== Elsternwick ===
The Elsternwick campus, established in late 1988 (formerly Methodist Ladies' College and Cato College), has over 420 students from early childhood through to Year 9.

=== Clunes ===
The Clunes residential campus was established in 1999. Year 9 students spend eight weeks living with one another as part of a unique residential program, where they learn with and contribute to the local community. Girls and boys live separately in 15 residential houses designed by award-winning architect, Daryl Jackson AO. Each house accommodates up to eight students, with adult House Leaders supporting the overall wellbeing of students and house logistics.

=== Yiramalay/Wesley Studio School ===
Established in 2088, Yiramalay was born out of a partnership between Wesley College and the Bunuba community of the Kimberley in Western Australia.

=== Outdoor Education Sites ===
Wesley has three outdoor education camp sites in Victoria. Wesley's 130 hectare outdoor education camp at Chum Creek, near Healesville, commenced in 1952, coinciding with the establishment of Timbertop by Geelong Grammar School. The original 200 acres (81 hectares) site was donated in 1952 by Alfred Wall, a parent whose family still owns land adjacent to the camp. One of the buildings was commemorated with a sign dedicated to Alfred Wall which has since fallen off and not been returned to its location. The remaining 100 acres (40 hectares) was purchased in late 1999. Camp Mallana is located on 5 hectares (12 acres) on the Banksia Peninsula, between Bairnsdale and Paynesville, with frontage to Lake Victoria and the Duck Arm shoreline. Camp Lochend, purchased in 1988, is located on 80 hectares (200 acres) near Portland.

== Child sex abuse ==
In 2021, Wesley College's administration was successfully sued for failing to protect students from child sexual abuse. Lawyers accused the private school's administration of allowing abuse to flourish and failing to protect students. A former student at Wesley College was awarded a record settlement of $3 million as compensation for institutional child abuse, after the court ruled that he was sexually assaulted by two former teachers at the school in the 1970s. The abuse was perpetrated by former staff members John McMillan, who sexually abused the boy at Wesley College leadership camps in the years between 1972 and 1974, and Stewart Heywood a former school counselor and long-time teacher, who then repeatedly abused the boy from 1976 until 1979. A number of other victims of McMillan and Heywood have come forward and accused Wesley College of putting "whatever legal obstacles they could" in order to prevent victims receiving proper compensation.

== History ==
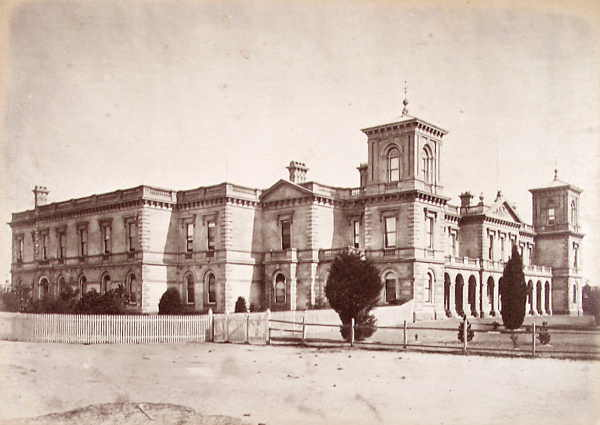
St Kilda Road Campus (1800s)

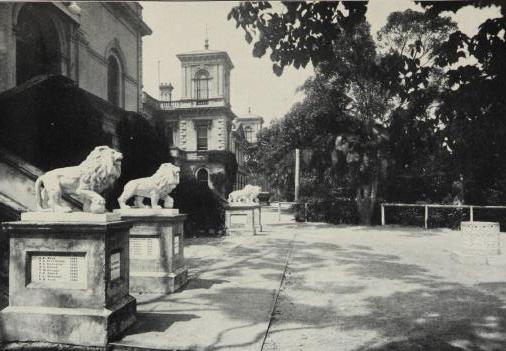
War Memorial Lions & Grey Towers

The beginnings of Wesley College came from a decision of the colonial government of Victoria in the wake of the Victorian gold rush to grant land and funds to four religious groups, including the Wesleyan Methodist Church, for the purpose of establishing colleges in Melbourne. In 1854, the government offered the Wesleyans 10 acres (40,000 m^{2}) facing St Kilda Road. Major benefactor Walter Powell encouraged other Wesleyan Methodists to bridge the gap in funds between the government grant and that required to build the school. Daniel Draper and others subsequently contributed sufficient funds. The foundation stone was laid at the present site of the St Kilda Road campus on 4 January 1865. Draper drowned at sea on the day of the school's official opening on 11 January 1866. The first student, Frederick Binks, arrived on 18 January.

James Waugh was chairman of the school committee from foundation until 1883. James Corrigan was the first of seven Headmasters in Wesley's first 35 years. The school struggled for numbers over some of this period. The Depression of the 1890s provided a particular challenge when Arthur Way was Headmaster, and came to a head in 1896 under Arthur Stephenson when enrolment dropped to 90 boys and closure was threatened. Thomas Palmer's tenure as headmaster was curtailed early in 1902 after he was found to have embezzled more than £1,000 of the school's funds.

The colours purple and gold were first chosen when the school was established in 1866. In 1875, they were changed to light blue and white (after Cambridge University and University of Melbourne), but reverted to purple and gold in 1902.

Lawrence Adamson is generally regarded as the single most important figure in the school's history. Adamson was Headmaster from 1902 to 1932 after beginning his teaching career there in 1887. His influence on Wesley survived well into the latter part of the 20th century from staff who were either appointed or were students during his tenure. A recent history of the school defined his contribution as giving Wesley "prosperity, direction and reputation". He personally contributed thousands of pounds of his personal fortune to the school. Adamson was considered less effective in his last decade as headmaster, with the centenary history published in 1967 providing the first overt criticism of him.

The St Kilda Road campus was substantially rebuilt and expanded between 1933 and 1939 following a bequest from philanthropists Alfred and George Nicholas. The gift of around £200,000 ($16 million in 2008) funded twin double-storey buildings, science laboratories, a Junior School building, swimming pool, gymnasium, chapel and other facilities. In 1942 the Australian Government requisitioned the school's campus for the Australian Army, resulting in Wesley being accommodated at Scotch College from 1942 to 1943. The college was running out of space at St Kilda Road and as early as 1937 had secured an option to purchase the land and buildings of Box Hill Grammar School (now Kingswood College). Headmaster Neil MacNeil advanced this option, opening negotiations in 1946. Commercial agreement was reached in 1947 following McNeil's death in office but was never acted on and finally abandoned in 1955.

Thomas Coates (1957–1971) and David Prest (1972–1991) were long-serving headmasters during a period of substantial change, particularly during Prest's tenure. The school purchased land at Syndal in 1955, and for the next few years considered selling the St Kilda Road campus to fund building at its new location. However, by 1959 it had decided to retain its St Kilda Road location, move the Junior School and establish playing fields at Syndal. Following a period of fund-raising, the new campus (renamed Glen Waverley campus in 1978) opened in 1966.

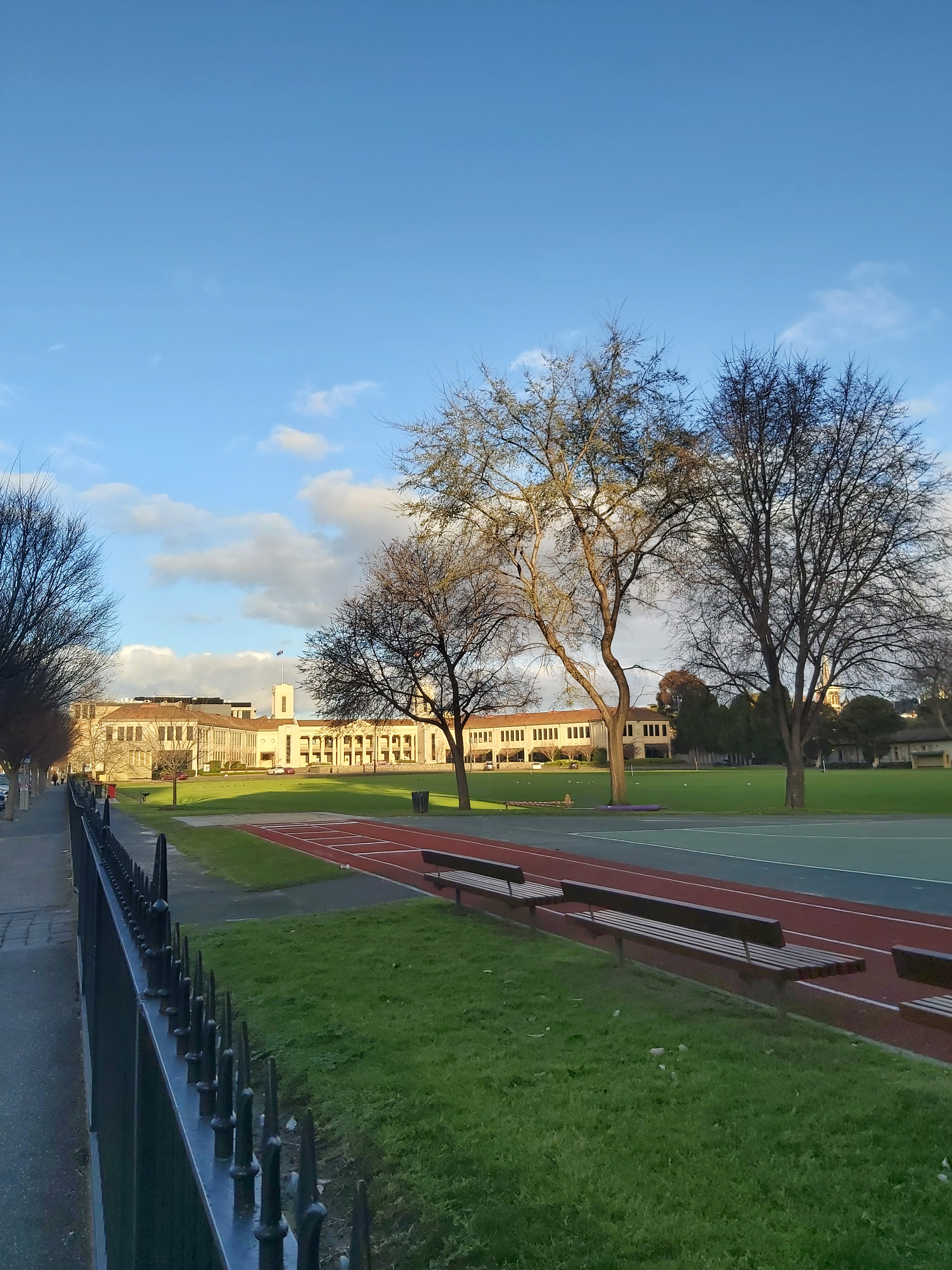
Wesley College, St Kilda Road

The school opened enrolment to girls in 1978. Boarding was discontinued in 1980, in order to accommodate more students at St Kilda Road. Wesley first approached Cato College, Elsternwick in the late 1970s regarding amalgamation. Struggling financially, Cato agreed to this in 1986, with integration into Wesley completed by 1989. In November 1989, a fire substantially damaged the St Kilda Road campus. Significant archival material was lost with the virtual destruction of the school library. The damaged areas were rebuilt by 1991.

Historian Andrew Lemon characterised Glen McArthur's tenure as headmaster (1992–1996) as leaving a sense of "unease".

With the two larger campuses becoming more autonomous and competitive, McArthur was encouraged by the school council to engender a greater sense of a single school, but in doing so he challenged the positions of both campus heads, who left during his tenure. Ill-health affected McArthur's incumbency, and he died in 1998. David Loader became principal of Wesley in 1997 after 18 years as head of Methodist Ladies' College, Melbourne and brought to fruition the country-based year 9 learning campus at Clunes in 2000. Former Glen Waverley campus head Helen Drennen became Wesley College's first female principal in June 2003.

In April 2016, a fire at the Glen Waverley campus destroyed ten years 5 and 6 classrooms.

=== Headmasters and principals ===
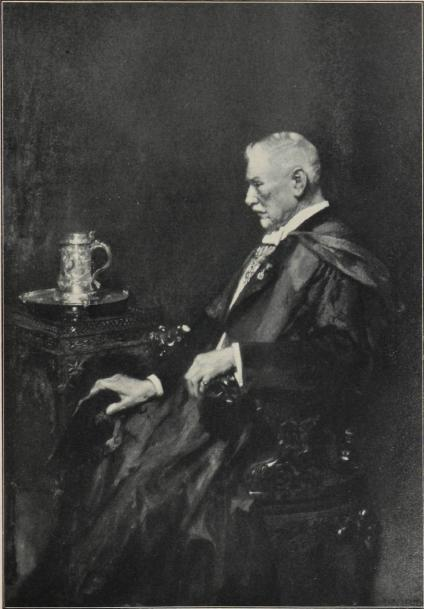
L.A Adamson (former Headmaster)

| Years | Name | Years | Name |
|---|---|---|---|
| 1866–1870 | James Corrigan | 1940–1946 | Neil McNeil |
| 1871–1875 | Martin Irving | 1947–1956 | Wilfred Frederick |
| 1876–1881 | Henry Andrew | 1957–1971 | Thomas Coates |
| 1882–1892 | Arthur Way | 1972–1991 | David Prest |
| 1893–1895 | Frank Goldstraw | 1992–1996 | Glen McArthur |
| 1896–1897 | Arthur Stephenson | 1997–2002 | David Loader |
| 1898–1901 | Thomas Palmer | 2003–2018 | Helen Drennen |
| 1902–1932 | Lawrence Adamson | 2019–present | Nicholas Evans |
| 1933–1939 | Harold Stewart | | |

=== Crest and motto ===
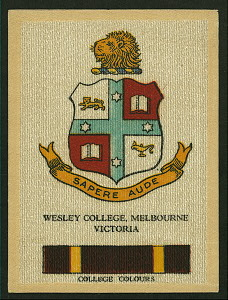
A cigarette card featuring the Wesley College's colours and crest (c. 1920s)

The Wesley College crest, designed by Frank Goldstraw, later headmaster from 1893 to 1895, first appeared in 1877. It acknowledges the Southern Cross in the cross quarters of the shield and visualises the college's motto. The lion passant, or standing, in the first quarter symbolises courage, vigilance and readiness to act in the daring pursuit of wisdom; the books in the second and third quarters symbolise the wisdom to be gained from learning; and the lamp in the fourth quarter symbolises the light of wisdom.

The Wesley College motto, Sapere Aude, appeared in the first College Prospectus of 1866. The words occur in the Epistles of Horace (I.ii.40): ‘Dimidium facti, qui coepit, habet. Sapere aude: Incipe’ or translated to ‘Well begun is half done. Dare to be Wise: make a beginning.

== Curriculum ==
Wesley begins its curriculum structure with the International Baccalaureate Primary Years Program (IB PYP) for 3 y/o to Year 6.

Students then commence the IB Middle Years Program (IB MYP) in Year 7 through to Year 10.

In Years 11 and 12, students select from two distinct pathways – the Victorian Certificate of Education (VCE) or the IB Diploma Program (IB DP).

Wesley College (Melbourne) VCE results 2012-2020
| Year | Rank | Median study score | Scores of 40+ (%) | Cohort size |
|---|---|---|---|---|
| 2012 | 66 | 33 | 15.2 | 232 |
| 2013 | 68 | 33 | 15.5 | 231 |
| 2014 | 78 | 33 | 13.0 | 206 |
| 2015 | 76 | 33 | 12.6 | 171 |
| 2016 | | | | |
| 2017 | 84 | 33 | 12.1 | 173 |
| 2018 | | | | |
| 2019 | 62 | 33 | 15.1 | 174 |
| 2020 | 99 | 32 | 10.0 | 168 |

Wesley College (Glen Waverley) VCE results 2012-2015
| Year | Rank | Median study score | Scores of 40+ (%) | Cohort size |
|---|---|---|---|---|
| 2012 | 102 | 32 | 9.7 | 196 |
| 2013 | 115 | 32 | 6.7 | 185 |
| 2014 | 115 | 32 | 6.9 | 183 |
| 2015 | 99 | 32 | 9.1 | 126 |

== Student life ==
=== Sport ===
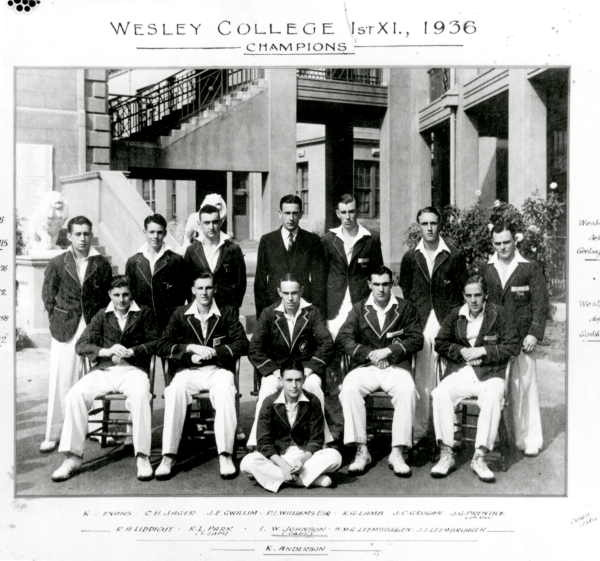
Wesley College Cricket – First XI, 1936, including Ian Johnson

Wesley was one of six founding members of the Associated Public Schools (APS). Lawrence Adamson's tenure as headmaster was Wesley's most successful period in APS competition. Between 1901 and 1915, the college won multiple premierships (first team titles) – rowing (12), football (9), athletics (4) and one for cricket. Since then, notable achievements have been consecutive football premierships between 1959 and 1962, with similar success in cricket between 1933 and 1936, and five cricket titles in six years between 1949 and 1954. Success has largely eluded Wesley in boys' athletics, with only one title since 1911, while the last boys' rowing title was in 1984.

In girls' sport Wesley has won seven athletics premierships in a row stretching from 2012 to 2018. Wesley has been successful in girls' sport, particularly in netball, softball and cross country, with over 30 premierships since 1981. Since 2000, Wesley girls have competed against schools from the Associated Grammar Schools of Victoria in addition to APS schools.

Wesley has over 120 teams competing in 19 sports from Year 5 to Year 12 level. Sport is compulsory at varying levels for students in Years 7 to 12.

==== APS & AGSV/APS Premierships ====
Wesley has won the following APS and AGSV/APS premierships.

Boys:

- Athletics (7) – 1906, 1907, 1910, 1911, 1944, 1945, 1947
- Basketball (4) – 1998, 1999, 2010, 2023
- Cricket (18) – 1894, 1902, 1910, 1919, 1933, 1934, 1935, 1936, 1939, 1949, 1950, 1951, 1953, 1954, 1960, 1969, 1993, 1999
- Cross Country (5) – 2016, 2017, 2018, 2019, 2021
- Football (22) – 1899, 1900, 1901, 1903, 1904, 1906, 1907, 1908, 1909, 1911, 1914, 1915, 1918, 1922, 1932, 1959, 1960, 1961, 1962, 1972, 1979, 2010
- Hockey (4) – 1993, 1994, 2010, 2019
- Rowing (24) – 1874, 1896, 1901, 1902, 1903, 1904, 1905, 1906, 1909, 1910, 1911, 1912, 1913, 1915, 1933, 1942, 1947, 1961, 1962, 1965, 1970, 1972, 1977, 1984
- Soccer – 2001
- Tennis (2) – 1990, 2006
- Water Polo – 1999, 2010

Girls:

- Athletics (10) – 1989, 1994, 2004, 2012, 2013, 2014, 2015, 2016, 2017, 2018
- Badminton (7) – 2004, 2005, 2006, 2011, 2013, 2014, 2019
- Basketball (6) – 2004, 2007, 2008, 2009, 2014, 2021
- Diving (2) – 2015, 2016
- Cross Country (18) – 1993, 1994, 1997, 1998, 1999, 2001, 2002, 2003, 2004, 2012, 2013, 2014, 2015, 2016, 2017, 2018, 2019, 2021
- Hockey (3) – 1998, 2006, 2014
- Netball (9) – 2000, 2001, 2002, 2007, 2008, 2009, 2010, 2013, 2019
- Rowing (2) – 1987, 2021
- Softball (11) – 1998, 1999, 2000, 2003, 2004, 2005, 2006, 2008, 2009, 2016, 2021
- Swimming (10) – 1989, 1990, 1991, 1992, 1993, 1994, 1995, 1997, 2014, 2015
- Swimming & Diving* (2) – 2012, 2013
- Tennis (12) – 1998, 2001, 2003, 2009, 2010, 2011, 2012, 2013, 2014, 2016, 2019, 2021
- Water Polo (7) – 2005, 2006, 2011, 2012, 2013, 2015, 2016

*From 1998 until 2013, swimming and diving events were awarded as a single premiership.

=== Drama ===
The St Kilda Road, Glen Waverley and Elsternwick campuses have separate student theatre companies. The Adamson Theatre Company, named after its principal performance venue was established by Tony Conabere at St Kilda Road campus in 1988. Theatrical performances at Glen Waverley and Elsternwick campuses are both performed under the name Wesley Student Theatre. Various facilities across the campuses are used as well as public venues such as BMW Edge at Federation Square and venues within the Arts Centre Melbourne.

The Glen Waverley campus has performed in New Zealand, Hong Kong, Thailand, Japan, Canada, America, England, Ireland, France, Italy and Germany since 1987.

=== Music ===
Glen Waverley & St Kilda Road campuses participate in the Generations in Jazz competition hosted by James Morrison with success achieved by St Kilda Rd (1st in Div 1 1999, 2002, 2004, 2007, 2010 and 2nd in 2008, 2009) and Glen Waverley (2nd in Div 2 2010, 1st in Div 3 2005, 2010).

The college has a long-standing singing tradition, with the first edition of its Wesley College Song Book published in 1893. The fourteenth edition was published in 2009 and over 140 tunes with lyrics have been included in the song book throughout the school's existence. The Wesley College Song Book is traditionally presented to all new students at the commencement of each school year and in turn the Wesley College Gift Book is presented when students leave the college.

=== Debating ===
Wesley College participates in the Debaters Association of Victoria (DAV) Schools' Competition and other debating & public speaking tournaments organised by Rotary, the RSL and the United Nations Youth Association of Australia. In 2006, Wesley won the DAV's Schools British Parliamentary debating competition, competing against Scotch College, Sydney Grammar School, and Melbourne Grammar School.

=== Public Questions Society ===
The Public Questions Society (PQS) was established at Wesley College in May 1924 and was instituted to provide a forum in which contemporary and controversial issues could be discussed. In the 1970s, College Headmaster, David Prest convinced the school council to provide funds to increase the supply of controversial figures to address the college on topics of the hour. Subjects in 1972, for example, included 'Black Power', 'Women's Liberation' and 'Legalisation of Marijuana'. Past speakers have included: Bob Hawke, Dick Hamer, Neale Fraser, Al Grassby, Lou Richards, Keith Dunstan, Ivan Southall, Geoffrey Blainey, Andrew Lemon and Wade Davis.

=== Other ===
The college also offers inter-school activities such as the Tournament of Minds competition, Alliance française competitions, the Duke of Edinburgh Award and other local competitions.

== Facilities ==
=== Structural ===
Original interior of Adamson Hall

Wesley College and the City of Port Phillip are joint owners of the Albert Park Tennis and Hockey Centre, a facility used by a number of schools, community groups and the general public.

The college's performing arts facilities include keyboard computer music laboratories, music rooms, private music lesson rooms, orchestra rooms, theatres for music, dance and drama, drama and communication studies rooms, performing arts studios, dance studios, recording studios and other recital rooms. Notable halls of Wesley College include Adamson Hall at the St Kilda Road campus (capacity 580), Cato Hall at Glen Waverley campus (600) and Fitchett Hall at Elsternwick (350).

The Coates Pavilion at Glen Waverley was reopened in 2009 following redevelopment. Stage 2 of the 2016 College Sport Facilities master-plan was completed in 2011 when the construction of a new indoor sport complex with associated amenities (including: a weights and conditioning facilities, health and wellbeing centre and staff offices) at the Glen Waverley campus was completed. At the Clunes campus the internal works of the heritage-listed Wesleyan Church were completed in 2010 with new heritage walls, flooring, ceiling and lighting installed; the historic pipe organ was also refurbished and rebuilt.

From 2011 to 2013 the St Kilda Road campus underwent its largest single redevelopment since the 1930s. The music school was completely rebuilt as a state-of-the-art music and drama facility and the adjacent Adamson Hall, the campus's primary dramatic theatre, was extensively refurbished with an expanded capacity of 580 seated, a fly tower, a hydraulic thrust stage, and a revamped sound and lighting rig.

=== Technology ===
Wesley was one of the first Australian schools to integrate laptop computers into its curriculum and according to its network provider in 2008, it operated Australia's largest school notebook PC program. Wesley's IT infrastructure includes over 4,000 notebook, 1,000 desktop computers and 850 network printers. In 2005 wireless internet was launched college-wide. In 2007 Wesley introduced tablet styled notebook computers and was the first educational institution in Australia to do so, but by 2010 were no longer being issued. In 2008, Art students were using Wacom pen-tablets for drawing use. Wesley introduced interactive whiteboards across all classrooms and some lecture theatres in 2008, allowing notes to be printed to a nearby printer or emailed to students. The college also began trialling electronic reading devices in 2008.

== Sustainability ==
In 2008, "green" guidelines were set for staff and students. At Glen Waverley, a desalination plant with four 260,000 litre tanks was installed in 2008 to treat water sourced from a bore originally installed in 1996. It is planned to recycle storm water and run-off irrigation water via storage in 15 additional 110,000 litre tanks to be installed by the end of June 2008. The Glen Waverley campus has 22 worm farms to recycle food scraps. At the St Kilda Road campus, a joint venture with the college's neighbour, Deaf Children Australia, is in place to drill a bore and two 55,000 litre tanks have been installed. At the Elsternwick campus, an artificial turf surface has been installed on the ovals. In maintaining with the college's environmental commitment, the lawn will be a carbon neutral project with additional landscaping to be undertaken around the perimeter to maximize rain catchment. As a result of a successful trial last year using bio-diesel in some of the college's buses, bio-diesel is being implemented for all suitable vehicles across the college. The college's electricity is now supplied from 25% green power sources.

In 2007 the Glen Waverley Junior School became the first independent school in Australia to receive a five-star energy rating from the Australian Government Sustainable Schools Program and by 2008 all campuses had received five-star energy ratings. Sustainability is now part of the college curriculum. In December 2007, Wesley was recognised by Yarra Valley Water in its advertising material for its sustainable water usage, its major water management policy and for reducing its water consumption by 68%.

== Wesley College Institute for Innovation in education ==
The Wesley College Institute for Innovation in Education was launched in 2005. Since 2007, the Wesley College Institute has been working with the Australian Council for Educational Research and the Australian Government's Education Department to develop the Australian Certificate of Education – Vocational. To this end, a pilot vocational program is being considered within the cattle industry in northern Western Australia, as part of the partnership Wesley has with the community at Fitzroy River. The institute is currently working on a project to establish studio colleges across remote outback Australia. The first studio college is located on Leopold Downs station about 80 km from Fitzroy Crossing.

In April 2010, the Wesley College Institute hosted the 2010 Global Language Convention at Glen Waverley, with delegates attending from 17 universities and over 140 schools.

== Notable alumni ==
Among the most notable Old Wesley Collegians are former Australian Prime Ministers Sir Robert Menzies and Harold Holt, historian Professor Geoffrey Blainey AC, cricketers Sam Loxton and Ian Johnson (both members of The Invincibles), AFL player and dual Brownlow Medallist Ivor Warne-Smith and politician, businessman and Olympian Sir Frank Beaurepaire, multiple Olympic and World Championship gold medallist Michael Klim, multiple world champion Emma Carney, tennis player Mark Philippoussis, netballer Sharelle McMahon and multiple knights of the realm.

== See also ==
- International Baccalaureate
- List of high schools in Victoria
- List of schools in Victoria, Australia
- Victorian Certificate of Education

== Sources ==
- Adamson of Wesley: the story of a Great Headmaster. Lawrence Arthur Adamson & Felix Meyer (1932) Robertson & Mullens BRN 155
- Wesley College: The First Hundred Years. Geoffrey Blainey, James Morrissey and S. E. K. Hulme (1967). Melbourne: Robertson & Mullens.
- A Great Australian School: Wesley College Examined. Andrew Lemon (2004) Helicon Press ISBN 0-9586785-8-8
- Wesley College Chronicle 2007. Wesley College Community (2007) Wesley College, Melbourne OCLC 748308469
- Lion Magazine August 2007 Edition. Wesley College Community (2007) Wesley College, Melbourne
- Cisco Systems Case study – Wesley College. Cisco Systems (2007) Cisco Australia
- Wesley College Technology 2008. Wesley College, Melbourne (2008) Wesley College, Melbourne
