= Hartley (surname) =

Hartley is a surname. Notable people with the surname include:

- Adele Hartley, Edinburgh film festival organiser
- Aidan Hartley (born 1965), British journalist
- A. J. Hartley (born 1964), British-born New York Times-bestselling author and Shakespearean dramaturg
- Al Hartley (1921–2003), American comic book writer
- Sir Andreas de Harcla, or Andrew Harclay, 1st Earl of Carlisle (c. 1270 – 1323)
- A. N. Hartley (1902–1994), English dog breeder
- Alex Hartley (born 1963), British artist
- Alfred Hartley (1879–1918), English cricketer
- Ann Hartley (1942–2024), New Zealand member of parliament
- Anne Jane Hartley, birth name of the actress Ann Gilbert (1821–1904)
- Anthony Hartley (1925–2000), British writer and critic
- Arthur Hartley (1889–1960), British civil engineer
- Bill Hartley (activist) (1930–2006), Australian political activist
- Bill Hartley (athlete) (born 1950), English athlete
- Blythe Hartley (born 1982), Canadian Olympic diver
- Bob Hartley (born 1960), Canadian National Hockey League coach
- Brendon Hartley (born 1989), New Zealand racing car driver
- Bria Hartley (born 1992), American basketball player
- Charles Hartley (disambiguation), several people, including

- Charles Augustus Hartley (1825–1915), British engineer
- Charles Hartley (educationist) (1865–1935), British educationist

- Charlie Hartley (Lancashire cricketer) (1873–1927), American-born English cricketer
- Charlie Hartley (Kent cricketer) (born 1994), English cricketer
- David Hartley (disambiguation)
- David Hartley (computer scientist), (born 1937)
- David Hartley (cricketer) (born 1963), English cricketer
- David Hartley (figure skater), British figure skater
- David Hartley (musician), known for working with Sting
- David Hartley (philosopher) (1705–1757), English philosopher and psychologist
- David Hartley (politician), member of the Ohio House of Representatives
- David Hartley (rugby league), English rugby league footballer of the 1960s and 1970s
- David Hartley (the Younger) (1731–1813), Member of Parliament and son of the English philosopher
- Dylan Hartley (born 1986), England rugby union player
- Edmund Barron Hartley (1847–1919), British Victoria Cross recipient
- Elizabeth Hartley (disambiguation) several people, including

- Elizabeth Hartley (Girl Guides) (1906–1996), English Girl Guide and author
- Elizabeth Hartley (actress) (1751–1824), English actress
- Elizabeth Hartley (archaeologist) (1947–2018), American archaeologist and museum curator

- Fergal Hartley (born 1973), Irish hurler
- F. J. Hartley (Rev. Francis John "Frank" Hartley, 1909–1971), Australian peace activist
- Fred A. Hartley, Jr. (1902–1969), U.S. politician, known for sponsoring the Taft-Hartley Act
- Gene Hartley (1926–1993), American racecar driver
- Grover Hartley (1888–1964), American baseball player
- Hal Hartley (born 1959), American film director
- Harry J. Hartley (born 1938), American academic administrator
- Herman Otto Hartley (1912–1980), German-American statistician
- J. R. Hartley, a fictional character and an author's pseudonym
- Jane D. Hartley, American politician
- Janet W. Hartley (born 1928), American virologist
- Jean Hartley (1933–2011), English autobiographer and publisher
- Jess Hartley (born 1967), American author and writer
- Jesse Hartley (1780–1860), British civil engineer
- Jo Hartley (born 1972), English actress
- John Hartley (disambiguation), several people including:
  - John Hartley (poet) (1839–1915), English poet
  - John Anderson Hartley (1844–1896), Australian educationalist
  - John Hartley (tennis) (1849–1935), English clergyman who won Wimbledon
  - John Hartley (cricketer) (1874–1963), English cricketer, played for Oxford and Sussex
- Jonathan Scott Hartley (1845–1912), American sculptor
- Julia Hartley-Brewer, British journalist
- Justin Hartley (born 1977), American actor
- Keef Hartley (1944–2011), British musician
- L. P. Hartley (1895–1972), British author
- Linda Hartley-Clark (born 1966), Australian actress
- Lindsay Hartley (born 1978), American singer and actress
- Mariette Hartley (born 1940), American actress
- Marsden Hartley (1877–1943), American artist
- Matthieu Hartley (born 1960), English musician
- Mike Hartley (baseball) (born 1961), American baseball player
- Nina Hartley (born 1959), adult-film actress
- Oliver C. Hartley (1823–1859), American lawyer
- Paul Hartley (born 1976), Scottish footballer
- Peter Hartley (cricketer) (born 1960), English cricketer
- Peter Hartley (footballer) (born 1988), English footballer
- Ralph Hartley (1888–1970), American electronics researcher
- Richard Hartley (disambiguation)
- Robert Hartley (1915–1998), British stage, film and television actor
- Roland H. Hartley (1864–1952), American politician
- Steven Hartley (born 1960), British actor
- Sue Hartley, British ecologist
- Ted Hartley (1924–2025), American U.S. Navy fighter pilot, investment banker, actor, film and stage producer
- Thomas Hartley (1748–1800), American lawyer
- Todd Hartley (born 1985), American football coach
- Vivian Hartley (1913–1963), birth name of the actress Vivien Leigh
- Wallace Hartley (1878–1912), English violinist and band leader who died on the Titanic
- Walter Hartley (disambiguation) several people, including

- Walter Hartley (organist) (1879–1969), British organist and composer
- Walter S. Hartley (1927–2016), American composer
- Walter Noel Hartley (1845–1913), British chemist and spectroscopy pioneer

- William Hartley (disambiguation) several people, including

- William Hartley (martyr) (1557–1588), English Roman Catholic priest and martyr
- William Hartley (politician) (1868–1950), Australian politician
- William G. Hartley (1942–2018), American historian and author
- William James Hartley (born 1945), political figure in British Columbia, Canada
- William Leonard Hartley (1916–2003), insurance salesman and politician in British Columbia, Canada
- William Pickles Hartley (1846–1922), jam manufacturer and philanthropist
