= Charles Hartley =

Charles Hartley may refer to:

- Charles Augustus Hartley (1825–1915), British engineer
- Charles Hartley (educationist) (1865–1935), British educationist
- Charlie Hartley (Lancashire cricketer) (1873–1927), American-born English cricketer
- Charlie Hartley (Kent cricketer) (born 1994), English cricketer

== See also ==
- Hartley (disambiguation)
