= David Hartley =

David Hartley may refer to:

- David Hartley (philosopher) (1705–1757), English philosopher
- David Hartley (the Younger) (1732–1813), son of the philosopher and signatory to the Treaty of Paris
- David Hartley (computer scientist) (born 1937), British computer scientist
- David Hartley (cricketer) (born 1963), English cricketer
- David Hartley (rugby league), rugby league footballer in the 1960s and 1970s
- David Hartley (figure skater), British figure skater
- David Hartley (musician), songwriter and arranger who collaborated with Sting
- David Hartley (politician), former member of the Ohio House of Representatives
- David Hartley (died 1770), leader of English counterfeiting gang Cragg Vale Coiners

== See also ==
- Hartley (disambiguation)
