= Hartley =

Hartley may refer to:

== Places ==
=== Australia ===
- Hartley, New South Wales
- Hartley, South Australia
  - Electoral district of Hartley, a state electoral district

=== Canada ===
- Hartley Bay, British Columbia

=== United Kingdom ===
- Hartley, Cumbria
- Hartley, Plymouth, Devon
- Hartley Wespall, Hampshire
- Hartley, Sevenoaks, Kent
- Hartley, Tunbridge Wells, Kent
- Hartley, Northumberland (Old Hartley), part of Seaton Sluice
- New Hartley, Northumberland

=== United States ===
- Hartley, California
- Hartley, Iowa
- Hartley, Michigan
- Hartley, South Dakota
- Hartley, Texas
- Hartley County, Texas
- Hartley Township (disambiguation)
- Brohard, West Virginia, also Hartley

=== Zimbabwe ===
- Chegutu, formerly Hartley

== People ==
- Hartley (surname)
- Hartley Burr Alexander, (1873–1939), American philosopher
- Hartley Alleyne (born 1957), Barbadian cricketer
- Hartley Booth (born 1946), British politician
- Hartley Coleridge (1796–1849), English writer
- Hartley Craig (1917–2007), Australian cricketer
- Hartley Douglas Dent (1929–1993), Canadian politician
- Hartley Dewart (1861–1924), Canadian lawyer and politician
- Hartley T. Ferrar (1879–1932), Irish geologist
- Hartley Gladstone Hawkins (1877–1939), Australian pastoralist and politician
- Hartley Hansen (born 1942), Australian jurist
- Hartley Hartley-Smith (1852–1905), English cricketer
- Hartley Heard (born 1947), English cricketer
- Hartley Jackson (born 1980), Australian professional wrestler
- Hartley Joynt (1938–2021), Australian cricketer
- Hartley Lobban (1926–2004), Jamaican-born cricketer
- Hartley Peavey (born 1941), American businessman
- Hartley Power (1894–1966), American-born British actor
- Hartley Pullan (1899–1968), British World War I flying ace
- Hartley Rogers Jr. (1926–2015), American mathematician
- Hartley Sawyer (born 1985), American actor
- Hartley Shawcross (1902–2003), British barrister and politician
- Hartley Teakle (1901–1979), Australian conservationist
- Hartley Williams (1843–1929), Australian jurist
- Hartley Williams (priest) (1844–1927), Australian Anglican priest
- Hartley Withers (1867–1950), English journalist and editor of The Economist

== Other uses ==
- Hartley (unit), a unit of information or entropy named after Ralph Hartley
- Hartley College, Point Pedro, Sri Lanka
- Hartley's, a UK jam and marmalade manufacturer
- USS Hartley (DE-1029), a Dealey class Destroyer Escort in the US Navy from 1957 to 1972
- Hartley, a fictional town in Lancashire in the BBC series Juliet Bravo
- J. R. Hartley, a fictional character in a 1983 Yellow Pages advert

== See also ==
- Comet Hartley (disambiguation)
- Hartley House (disambiguation)
