= Movement No. 5, Provincetown Houses =

1916 painting by Marsden Hartley

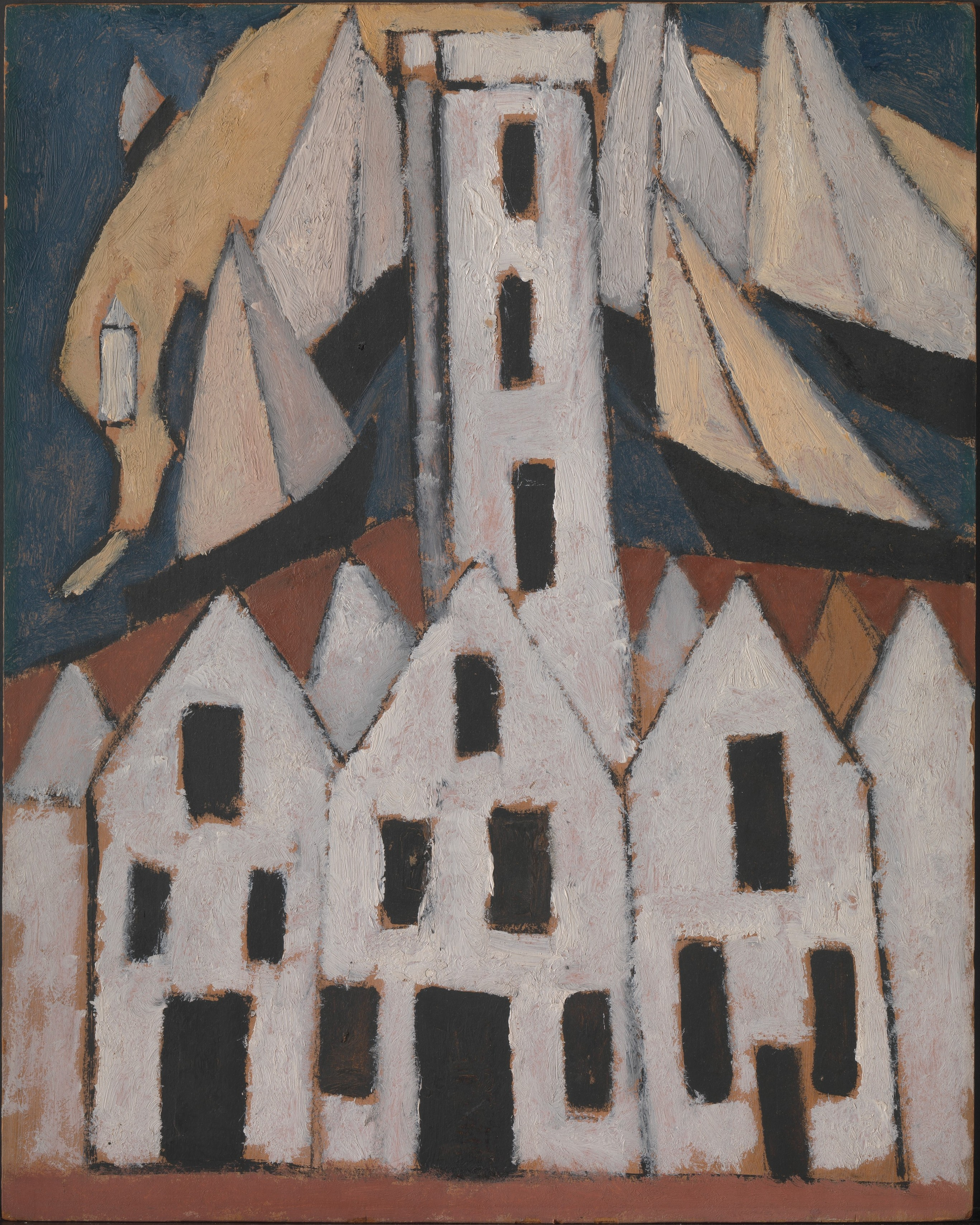
- Artist: Marsden Hartley
- Year: 1916
- Dimensions: 50.8 cm (20.0 in) × 40.6 cm (16.0 in)
- Location: Metropolitan Museum of Art
- Accession no.: 49.70.43
- Identifiers: The Met object ID: 488487

Movement No. 5, Provincetown Houses is a 1916 painting by Marsden Hartley. It is in the collection of the Metropolitan Museum of Art.

== Early history and creation ==
Hartley spent the summer of 1916 with watercolorist Charles Demith and playwright Eugene O'Neill in Provincetown, Massachusetts, following time spent in Berlin focusing on portraits of German officers. His return to America was marked by an embrace of representational painting and landscape. Hartley engaged in the art movement Regionalism, which championed realism and straightforward depictions of everyday life.
