= William Hartley =

William Hartley may refer to:

- William Hartley (martyr) (1557–1588), English Roman Catholic priest and martyr
- William Hartley (politician) (1868–1950), Australian politician
- William G. Hartley (born 1942), American historian and author
- William James Hartley (born 1945), Canadian political figure in British Columbia
- William Leonard Hartley (1916–2003), Canadian insurance salesman and politician in British Columbia
- Sir William Pickles Hartley (1846–1922), English jam manufacturer and philanthropist
- Bill Hartley (activist) (1930–2006), Australian political activist
- Bill Hartley (athlete) (born 1950), English former athlete

== See also ==
- Hartley (disambiguation)
