= Banquet in Silence (Marsden Hartley) =

Painting by Marsden Hartley

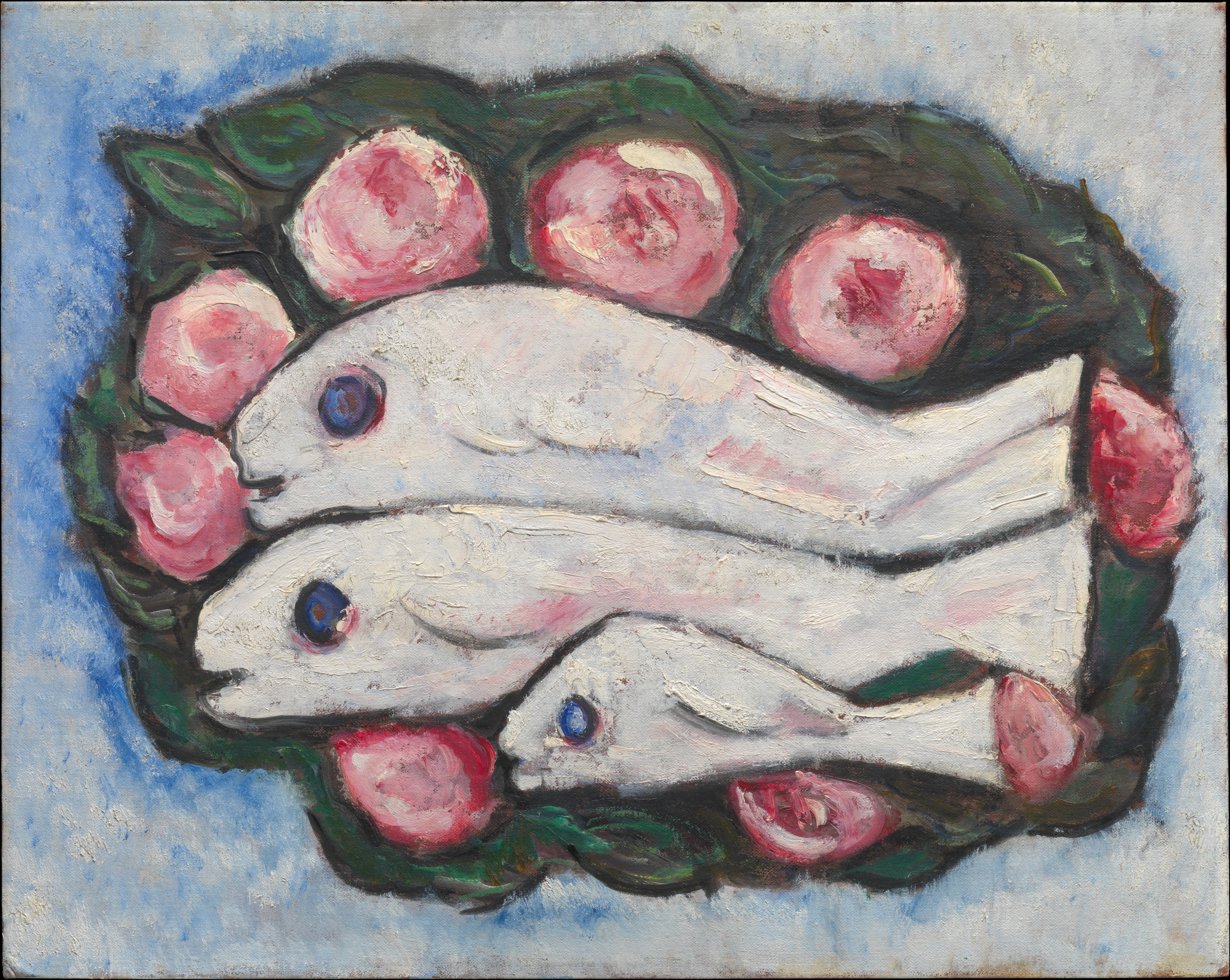
- Artist: Marsden Hartley
- Year: 1930s
- Dimensions: 40.3 cm (15.9 in) × 50.8 cm (20.0 in)
- Location: Metropolitan Museum of Art
- Accession No.: 49.92.1
- Identifiers: The Met object ID: 488563

"Banquet in Silence" is a 1930s painting by Marsden Hartley. It is in the collection of the Metropolitan Museum of Art.

== Early history and creation ==
The painting was created in 1935–1936 and is composed of oil paint on canvas board.

== Later history and display ==
The artwork was given by Marsden Hartley to Georgia O'Keeffe who then donated it to the Metropolitan Museum of Art.

== Description ==
The work depicts a banquet plate with fish and unidentified fruit on it.
