= Hartley House =

Hartley House may refer to:

- Hartley House, Palm Harbor, Florida, home of the North Pinellas Historical Museum
- Hartley Farms, Morristown, New Jersey, listed on the National Register of Historic Places
- Hartley House Settlement, community center in New York City
- Bollinger-Hartley House, Blowing Rock, North Carolina, listed on the National Register of Historic Places
- Orrin B. Hartley House, Hood River, Oregon
- Hartley House (Batesburg, South Carolina)
- Hartley House (Batesburg-Leesville, South Carolina), also known as the Bond-Bates-Hartley House
- Hartley House (Houston, Texas), listed on the National Register of Historic Places
- Roland Hartley House, Everett, Washington

== See also ==
- Hartley (disambiguation)
