= Charlie Hartley =

Charlie Hartley may refer to:

- Charlie Hartley (Lancashire cricketer) (1873–1927), cricketer for Lancashire
- Charlie Hartley (Kent cricketer) (born 1994), English cricketer for Kent
