= Lobban =

Lobban is a surname. Notable people with the name include:

- Donna Lobban (born 1986), Australian squash player
- Greg Lobban (born 1992), British squash player
- Hartley Lobban (1926–2004), Jamaican-born English cricketer
- Iain Lobban (born 1960), director of British signals intelligence agency GCHQ
- Mary C. Lobban (1922–1982), British physiologist
- Michael Lobban (born 1962), British legal scholar
- Richard Lobban (born 1943), American anthropologist and archaeologist
