= Jack Davies (cricketer, born 1911) =

English psychologist and sportsman (1911–1992)

Personal information
- Full name: Jack Gale Wilmot Davies
- Born: 10 September 1911; Broad Clyst, Devon
- Died: 5 November 1992 (aged 81); Cambridge
- Batting: Right-handed
- Bowling: Right arm off spin

Domestic team information
- Years: Team
- 1931–1934: Cambridge University
- 1934–1951: Kent

Career statistics
Competition	First-class
Matches	153
Runs scored	5,982
Batting average	23.92
100s/50s	4/30
Top score	168
Balls bowled	18,292
Wickets	258
Bowling average	30.41
5 wickets in innings	6
10 wickets in match	1
Best bowling	7/20
Catches/stumpings	87/–
- Source: CricInfo, 20 July 2009

Jack Gale Wilmot Davies OBE (10 September 1911 – 5 November 1992) was an English psychologist and sportsman who played first-class cricket and top-level rugby union. He served in the War Office during World War II and was a noted academic psychologist. He served as the President of MCC in 1985–1986 and was the tenth person elected an Honorary Life Vice-president of the club.

== Early life and education ==
Davies was born in Broad Clyst in Devon in 1911. He attended Tonbridge School in Kent where he was in the Cricket XI for four years, captaining the team in 1930, his final year. He was strong academically and won a scholarship to study classics at St John's College, Cambridge. He won a cricket Blue in 1933 and 1934 after an ankle injury forced him to pull out of the University Match in 1931. Davies made his first-class cricket debut whilst at University. Academically he was awarded a first-class honours degree in classics, graduating in 1934.

== Sporting career ==
Davies made his first-class cricket debut for Cambridge University in 1931 in a match against Yorkshire at Fenner's. He played 38 first-class matches for the university team, including against touring teams from New Zealand, West Indies and Australia. It was against Australia in 1934 that he achieved his most notable feat when he bowled Don Bradman for a duck, the first time Bradman had made nought in England.

Davies, who bowled off-spin, went on to play 99 times for Kent County Cricket Club, making his debut in July 1934 after graduating from Cambridge. He had first played for the county's Second XI in 1932 in the Minor Counties Championship and played in the First XI as an amateur until 1951, primarily during his summer holidays. He won his county cap in 1936 when he took 7/20 against Essex at the Nevill Ground in Tunbridge Wells. He was described in his Wisden obituary as a "stylish and dashing right-hand batsman" who usually batted in the middle order, although he opened the batting for Kent successfully for a time in 1946, scoring three of his four centuries and scoring 1,000 runs for the only time in his career during the season. He was an effective bowler who took 258 wickets in his first-class career and a "brilliant cover point" in the field.

After retiring from county cricket he played for MCC in the annual first-class match against Cambridge University from 1953 to 1961, captaining the team on the last seven occasions and playing his final first-class match aged 49. He had played in a match for an England team against the Dominions in 1945 and was mentioned in a list of potential England batsmen and captains in the 1945 edition of Wisden. He also made one appearance in the Gentlemen v Players fixture in 1946. He played club cricket for Blackheath after the Second World War and was a member of the wandering Buccaneers Cricket Club.

Away from cricket, Davies played rugby union for Blackheath F.C. and for Kent in the winter months. He captained Blackheath in 1938–39 and in 1945–46. Davies won the Rugby fives national singles title three times between 1936 and 1939, having finished as runner-up in 1935. He was a runner-up in the Cyriax Cup, the Rugby Fives pairs competition, in 1939.

== War service and later life ==
In 1939 Davies took a second degree in psychology from the National Institute of Industrial Psychology. He served in the War Office in World War II, becoming Chief Psychologist in the Directorate for the Selection of Personnel and rising to the rank of Colonel. He was awarded an OBE in the 1946 Birthday Honours. He went on to work at the United Nations and was appointed as Secretary of the University Appointments Board at Cambridge University in 1952.

Davies was elected Treasurer of Cambridge University Cricket Club in 1958 and was a member of the MCC Committee, becoming Treasurer from 1976 to 1980 and President in 1985–1986. He was later elected one of MCC's Honorary Life Vice-presidents in 1988, only the tenth person to be honoured in this way. He was elected in the same year as Bradman.

He was an executive director of the Bank of England and an occasional journalist with the Daily Telegraph and in 1990 was made an Honorary Fellow of the British Psychological Society. Davies died in 1992 in Cambridge aged 81.
