= Colin Bremner =

Australian cricketer

Personal information
- Full name: Colin David Bremner
- Born: 29 January 1920; Hawthorn, Victoria, Australia
- Died: 13 June 2002 (aged 82); Canberra, Australian Capital Territory, Australia
- Batting: Right-handed
- Role: Wicket-keeper

Career statistics
Competition	First-class
Matches	7
Runs scored	8
Batting average	2.66
100s/50s	–/–
Top score	4*
Catches/stumpings	4/6
- Source: Cricinfo, 2 February 2022

Colin David Bremner (20 January 1920 – 13 June 2002) was an Australian first-class cricketer and Royal Australian Air Force officer.

Bremner was born in the Melbourne suburb of Hawthorn in January 1920. He served in the Australian Army during the Second World War, enlisting as a private in August 1940. He remained as a private in the army until his discharge in August 1941. He re-enlisted as a flight lieutenant in the Royal Australian Air Force in January 1942, serving in the maritime patrol No. 461 Squadron RAAF in Europe. Following the end of the war in Europe, Bremner represented the Dominions cricket team in a first-class cricket match against England at Lord's in August 1945; he notably twice stumped Wally Hammond in the match, but only after he had reached a century in each innings. He returned home to Australia with the Australian Services cricket team following the war, stopping off in Ceylon and British India on the homeward journey, where he appeared in three first-class matches for the team. Arriving in Australia in December 1945, Bremner represented the Australian Services in three further first-class matches against Western Australia, Victoria and Tasmania. Playing in seven first-class matches in all as a wicket-keeper, Bremner took 4 catches and made 6 stumpings, in addition to scoring 8 runs with the bat. Bremner later served in the Korean War, during which he was mentioned in dispatches in October 1952 for valuable service in the air. He died at Canberra in June 2002.
