= Cemetery, New Mexico (Marsden Hartley) =

1924 painting by Marsden Hartley

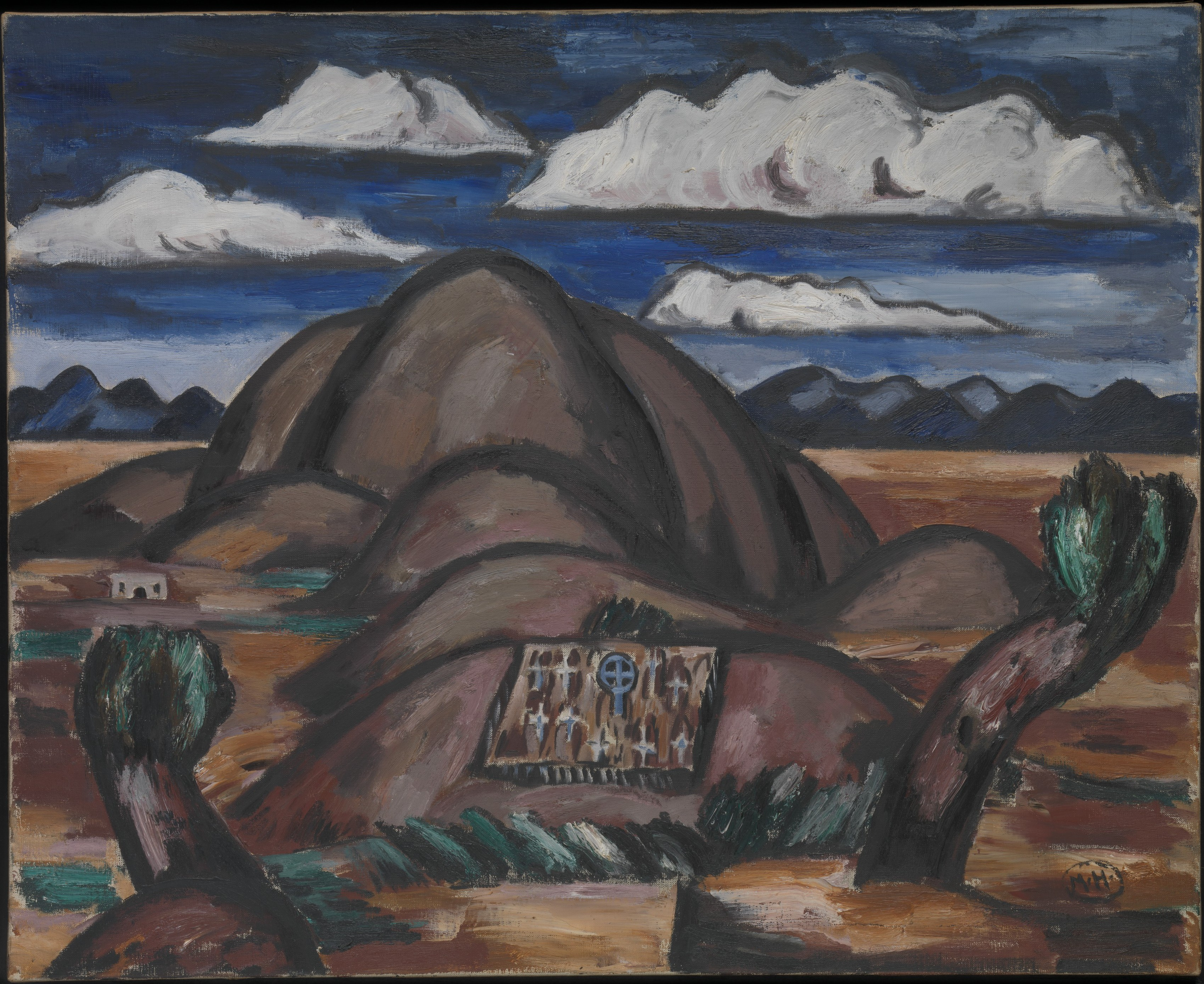
- Artist: Marsden Hartley
- Year: 1924
- Medium: Oil on canvas
- Dimensions: 80.3 cm × 99.7 cm (31.6 in × 39.3 in)
- Location: Metropolitan Museum of Art; New York

Cemetery, New Mexico is an early 20th century painting by American artist Marsden Hartley. Done in oil on canvas, the painting depicts a cemetery in Taos Pueblo, New Mexico. The work is in the collection of the Metropolitan Museum of Art.

== Description ==
=== History ===
In 1918–1919, Marsden Hartley and a group of artists visited the American Southwest. One destination on this trip was the state of New Mexico, specifically the town of Taos, the nearby Taos Pueblo Reservation (which housed a resident group of artists known as the Taos art colony) and Santa Fe. Hartley and his fellow travelers lived in the art colony for 18 months. During this period of habitation, Hartley made a mental note of the area's topography, sky, and a small cemetery nearby. However, he was unable to render the scene into a painting at the time.

While visiting Europe (in a trip from 1923 to 1924), Hartley began painting a series of works he called "recollections". The works Hartley produced in this series were painted from memory, with one such work being Cemetery, New Mexico, a Modernist painting depicting a small cemetery in Taos Pueblo. As noted in the Met's profile of Cemetery, Hartley painted from memory to emulate American artist Albert Pinkham Ryder, who the former admired.

=== Painting ===
Cemetery itself depicts a cemetery set before a mountain in Taos Pueblo, New Mexico. As noted in the Met's profile of Cemetery, the work exhibits signs of being painted in an exaggerated, abstract, lazy-like way, likely a result of being painted from Hartley's memory.
