= Elizabeth Hartley =

Elizabeth Hartley may refer to:

- Elizabeth Hartley (actress) (1751–1824), English actress
- Elizabeth Hartley (Girl Guides) (1906–1996), active in the Girl Guiding movement
- Elizabeth Hartley (archaeologist) (1947–2018), archaeologist and museum curator

== See also ==
- Elizabeth Hartley Winthrop (born 1979), American writer
