= John Hartley =

John Hartley may refer to:

- John Anderson Hartley (1844–1896), Australian educator
- John Hartley (academic), Australian academic, professor of cultural studies
- Jock Hartley (John Cabourn Hartley, 1874–1963), cricketer played for Oxford University, Sussex CCC and England
- John Hartley (general), Australian major general
- John Hartley, one half of Nottinghamshire musical duo Phil and John
- John Hartley (poet) (1839–1915), Yorkshire
- John Hartley (tennis) (1849–1935), English clergyman who won Wimbledon
