= Dominions cricket team =

World War II cricket team

A Dominions cricket team, representing the Dominions of the British Empire, played nine cricket matches, all in England during wartime. The team was formed in June 1918 and played three matches against an England XI that summer, two at Lord's and one at Kennington Oval but these were not first-class. The team was revived in May 1943 and played six matches between then and August 1945. The team's sole first-class match was against England at Lord's in late August 1945. This was the seventh match of first-class status to be played in England since 1939.

== Representative match ==
All but two of the England team either already had, or would later gain, Test caps, and the other two (Eddie Phillipson and Jack Davies) would play over 150 first-class matches each, but the Dominions side was far more uneven in this regard. Cricketers including Learie Constantine (captaining the team in his final first-class match) and Keith Miller played with Hartley Craig for whom this was his only first-class game.

The Dominions won the toss and batted, and Donnelly's 133 helped them to 307 all out; Wright took 5–90. England's reply started badly as they fell to 96/6, but a stand of 177 between captain Hammond (121) and Edrich (78) saw them to 287. In their second innings, the Dominions' total of 336 was massively helped by Miller's 185; Wright claimed 5–105. Chasing 357 to win, 102 from Hammond and 56 from Davies were not enough and they were dismissed for 311; the Dominions thus won by 45 runs.

25–28 August 1945
Scorecard

Dominions	v	England
307 (103.2 overs); MP Donnelly 133; DVP Wright 5/90 (30 overs)		287 (88.3 overs); WR Hammond 121; CG Pepper 4/57 (18 overs)
336 (85.1 overs); KR Miller 185; DVP Wright 5/105 (30.1 overs)		311 (101.3 overs); WR Hammond 102; CG Pepper 3/67 (33 overs)

Dominions won by 45 runs
Lord's, London

- Dominions won the toss and elected to bat.
- 26 August was taken as a rest day
- HS Craig and CD Bremner (both Dominions) made their first-class debuts.

== England team ==
- Jack Robertson
- Laurie Fishlock
- James Langridge
- Eddie Phillipson
- Billy Griffith (wicket-keeper)
- Wally Hammond (captain)
- Harold Gimblett
- Bill Edrich
- Jack Davies
- Doug Wright
- Eric Hollies

== Dominions team ==
- Hartley Craig ( (Australia) )
- Desmond Fell ( (South Africa) )
- Jack Pettiford ( (Australia) )
- Keith Miller ( (Australia) )
- Martin Donnelly ( (New Zealand) )
- Learie Constantine ( (Trinidad and Tobago) ) (captain)
- Cec Pepper ( (Australia) )
- Bob Cristofani ( (Australia) )
- Graham Williams ( (Australia) )
- Reginald Ellis ( (Australia) )
- Colin Bremner ( (Australia) ) (wicket-keeper)
