= Martin Donnelly (sportsman) =

New Zealand sportsman (1917–1999)

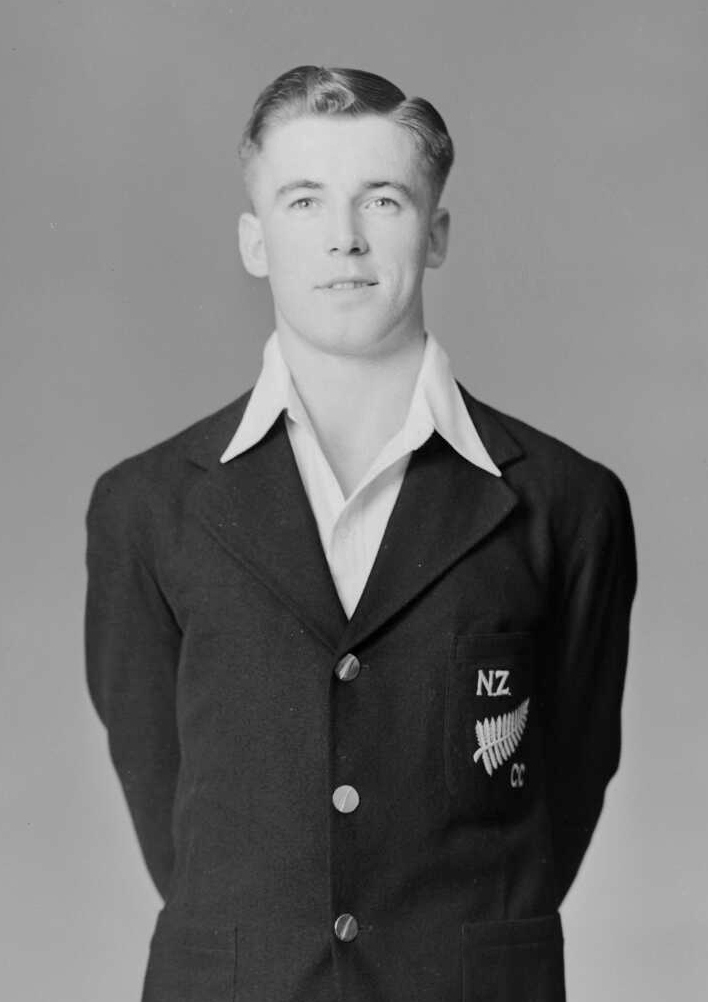
- Donnelly in 1937

Personal information
- Born: 17 October 1917; Ngāruawāhia, New Zealand
- Died: 22 October 1999 (aged 82); Sydney, New South Wales, Australia
- Nickname: Squib
- Batting: Left-handed
- Bowling: Slow left-arm orthodox

International information
- National side: New Zealand (1937–1949)
- Test debut (cap 28): 26 June 1937 v England
- Last Test: 13 August 1949 v England

Career statistics
Competition	Test	First-class
Matches	7	131
Runs scored	582	9,250
Batting average	52.90	47.43
100s/50s	1/4	23/46
Top score	206	208*
Balls bowled	30	3,484
Wickets	0	43
Bowling average	–	39.13
5 wickets in innings	–	0
10 wickets in match	–	0
Best bowling	–	4/32
Catches/stumpings	7/–	76/–
- Source: Cricinfo, 1 April 2017

Martin Paterson Donnelly (17 October 1917 – 22 October 1999) was a New Zealand-born sportsman who played Test cricket for New Zealand and rugby union for England. He worked for Courtaulds in England and Sydney.

== Personal life ==
Born in Ngāruawāhia, New Zealand, Donnelly's twin brother Maurice died in the Spanish flu epidemic in 1918. Donnelly's maternal great-grandfather, William Butler was a British Army veteran in the 20th Regiment of Foot later renamed the Lancashire Fusiliers and settled in Howick, New Zealand in 1847 as part of the Royal New Zealand Fencible Corps.

== Cricket career ==
=== 1930s ===
Donnelly's sporting talent emerged quickly and Donnelly became known for his batting and fielding skills, as well as his prowess at Rugby Union. He attended New Plymouth Boys' High School, and quickly made an impact- recording 187 for NPBHS in a club match in 1934 which stood as a school record for 76 years. Donnelly made 49 for Taranaki against the touring MCC side in January 1936. This led to his first-class debut in January 1936 for Wellington in a Plunket Shield match against Auckland, in which he made 22 and 38.

Aged only 19, Donnelly was a surprise selection for the 1937 New Zealand tour of England, having played only one first-class match. After showing more promise than results in the warm up matches, the selectors showed patience and Donnelly made his Test debut in the 1st Test at Lord's. He made a duck and 21, but remained in the team to make 4 and 37*, and 58 and 0 in the following two Tests. He achieved greater success against the county sides, finishing second in the batting averages, and earned praise from Wisden, which called him "a star in the making".

Returning to New Zealand, Donnelly moved to Christchurch in 1938 to attend the University of Canterbury and play for Canterbury. While there, he won the Redpath Cup as the best batsman in the Plunket Shield in 1939. He also played rugby for Canterbury University, the Canterbury Provincial XV, and for New Zealand Universities.

=== 1940s ===
At the completion of his degree, Donnelly returned to Wellington but played only one more first-class match before enlisting in the New Zealand Army in 1940. Commissioned in 1941, he served as a tank commander in northern Africa and Italy, rising to the rank of Major. While in Cairo, he purchased what would become his lucky cap, an old multi-striped number, that he would wear whenever he took the field in his post-war cricketing career.

At war's end, Donnelly was a member of the Dominions side that played an England XI at Lord's in 1945, making 133, including a six hit onto the roof of the pavilion, before going up to Worcester College, Oxford, to read history. He played cricket for Oxford University in 1946, scoring six centuries, and then as captain in 1947. He headed the Oxford batting averages each year, gained a reputation as the best left-hander in the world, and won selection as Wisden Cricketer of the Year in 1948.

Following his graduation from Oxford, Donnelly commenced working as a manager for textile manufacturing company Courtaulds while playing cricket for Warwickshire. In 1948, playing for Warwickshire against Middlesex, he was bowled by left-arm spinner Jack Young from the wrong side of the stumps, the ball having bounced off his foot and over his head before landing behind the stumps and spinning back to dislodge the bails.

He continued to impress observers with his attacking style of play, including former champion C B Fry, who believed Donnelly to be the best left-handed batsman he had seen. On this form, Donnelly was chosen for the 1949 New Zealand tour of England, where he continued to enhance his reputation, making 462 runs in the Test series at 77.00, including scores of 64, 206, 75 and 80. Donnelly's 206 at Lord's was the first Test double century by a New Zealander and remained the highest New Zealand Test score until Bert Sutcliffe's 230 not out against India at Delhi in 1955–56.

The 1949 series would prove to be the end of Donnelly's Test career. In all, Donnelly played just seven Tests, all in England, making 582 runs at 52.90.

A short man (his nickname was "Squib"), Donnelly is one of only two cricketers (along with Percy Chapman) to have scored centuries at Lord's in each of the three "classic matches": Test matches (206 for New Zealand against England in 1949), Gentlemen versus Players (scoring 162 for the Gentlemen in 1947) and the University Match (scoring 142 for Oxford against Cambridge in 1946).

In 1960, Neville Cardus expressed the opinion that Donnelly was the finest left-handed foreign batsman to play in England since World War II. Donnelly's favourite shot, a legside flick off the pads, often had spectators gasping in admiration, while some commentators suggested he was the best cover-point of all time.

== Rugby career ==
Donnelly also played rugby for the Oxford University team, achieving success as a fly half, and, less successfully, as centre in the English national rugby side for their match against Ireland at Lansdowne Road in Dublin in 1947.

== Later life ==
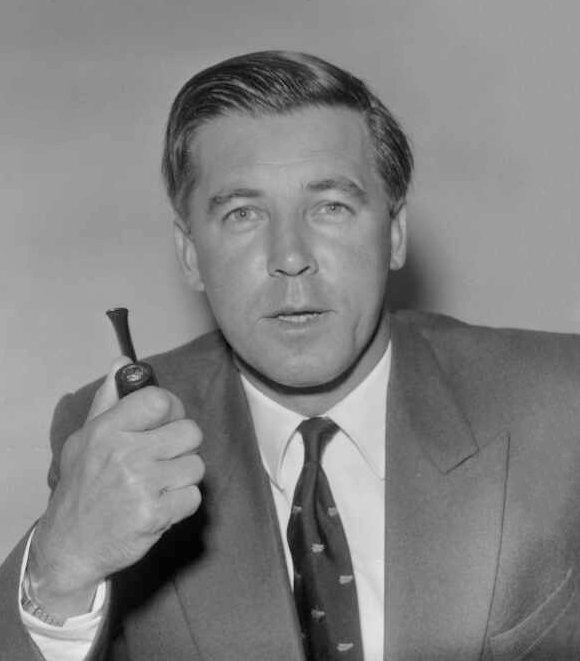
Donnelly in 1956

After four first-class matches in 1950, Courtaulds transferred the newly married Donnelly to their Sydney office to assume a managerial role. He left soon after settling in Sydney where he owned a news agency. He developed a preference for fishing over cricket.

Despite having played only 13 of his 131 first-class matches in New Zealand, and in only seven Test matches, none of which were in New Zealand, he was elevated to the New Zealand Sports Hall of Fame in 1990. He died in Sydney on 22 October 1999, survived by his wife, three sons and one daughter.

Donnelly House, one of four houses at New Plymouth Boys' High School, is named in his honour.

Wesley Harte wrote Martin Donnelly: His Record-By-Innings in 1990. A biography titled Martin Donnelly: New Zealand Cricket's Master Craftsman was written by Rod Nye and published in 1999.
