= Ron Rhine =

American politician (1937–2024)

Member of the Ohio House of Representatives from the 74th district
- In office January 3, 2001 – January 3, 2003
- Preceded by: David Hartley
- Succeeded by: Chris Widener

Personal details
- Born: July 2, 1937 Springfield, Ohio, U.S.
- Died: December 5, 2024 (aged 87) Springfield, Ohio, U.S.
- Party: Democratic

Ronald V. Rhine (July 2, 1937 – December 5, 2024) was an American politician who was a Democratic member of the Ohio House of Representatives from 2001 to 2003. His district encompassed portions of Clark County, Ohio, which is the home of Springfield, Ohio. He was succeeded by Republican Chris Widener, after district was redrawn to become more conservative. Rhine died on December 5, 2024, at the age of 87.

== Sources ==
- Ron Rhine wins primary election
- Governor can be grateful for Tressel
