= Hartley Township =

Hartley Township may refer to:

- Hartley Township, O'Brien County, Iowa
- Hartley Township, Union County, Pennsylvania

== See also ==
- Hartley (disambiguation)
