= Hartley, South Dakota =

Unincorporated community in South Dakota, U.S.

Coordinates: 44°24′04″N 101°48′38″W

Hartley is an unincorporated community in Haakon County, in the U.S. state of South Dakota.

== History ==
A post office called Hartley was established in 1908, and remained in operation until 1948. The community took its name from Hartley, Iowa, the native home of a first settler.
