= Hartley Craig =

Australian cricketer

Cricket information
- Batting: Left-handed

Career statistics
| Competition | First-class |
|---|---|
| Matches | 1 |
| Runs scored | 88 |
| Batting average | 44.00 |
| 100s/50s | 0/1 |
| Top score | 56 |
| Catches/stumpings | 0/– |
- Source: Cricinfo, 16 August 2022

Hartley Samuel Craig (19 September 1917 – 26 August 2007) was an Australian cricketer, born in Prospect, Adelaide.

Craig served with the Royal Australian Air Force during the Second World War as a flight sergeant. He played a number of minor matches in 1945 for the Royal Australian Air Force cricket team, but his only first-class appearance came at the end of that summer when he played for the Dominions against England at Lord's. Opening the batting he scored 56 and 32.

His brother Reginald had a longer first-class career, playing 31 times for South Australia.
