= Hartley House (Batesburg-Leesville, South Carolina) =

Historic house in South Carolina, United States

- U.S. National Register of Historic Places
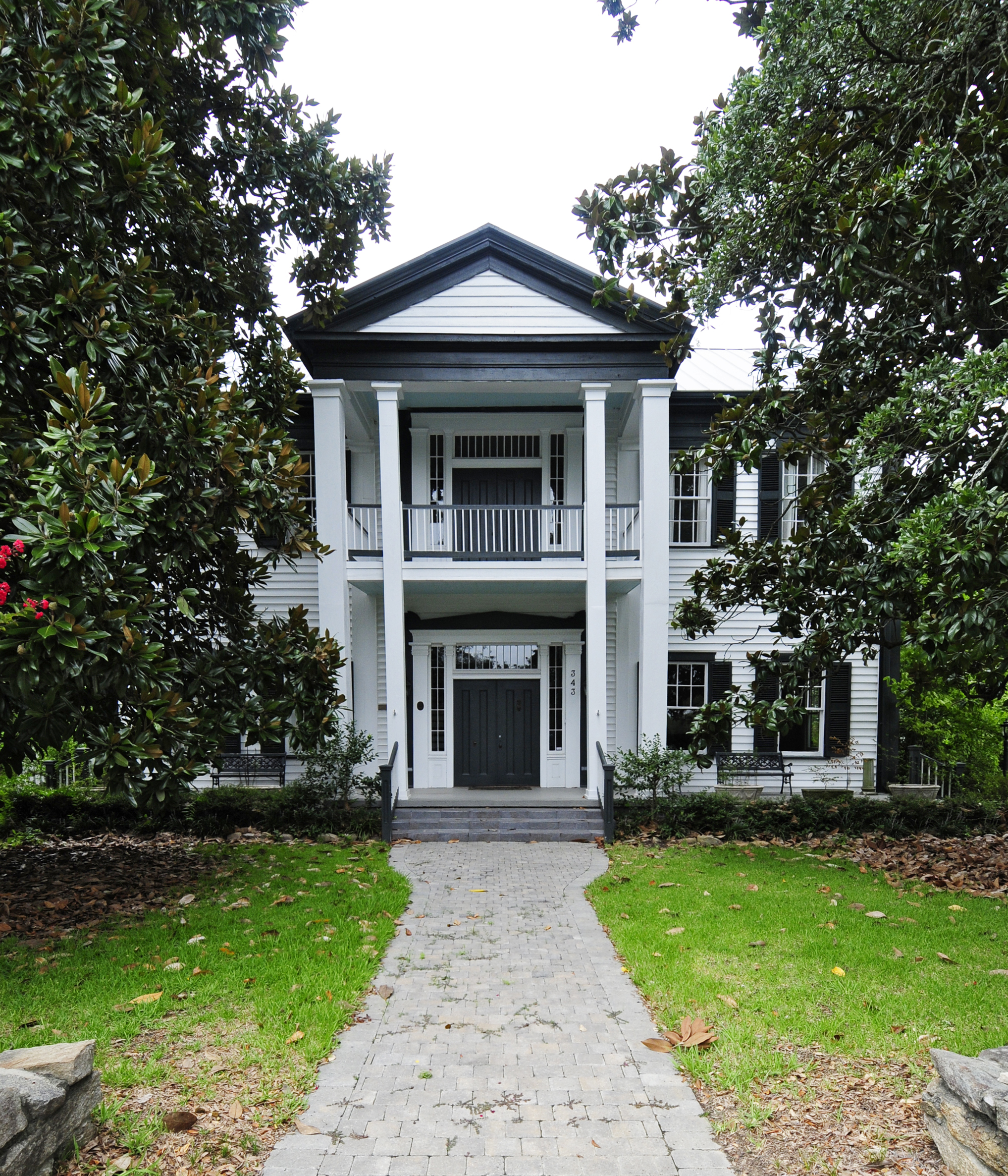
- Hartley House, August 2012

- Location within South Carolina
- Location: 305 W. Columbia Ave., Batesburg-Leesville, South Carolina
- Coordinates: 33°54′23″N 81°32′27″W
- Area: two acres
- Built: c. 1790
- Architectural style: Greek Revival
- MPS: Batesburg-Leesville MRA
- NRHP reference No.: 82003878
- Added to NRHP: July 9, 1982

Hartley House, also known as the Bond-Bates-Hartley House, is a historic home located at Batesburg-Leesville, Lexington County, South Carolina. It was built before 1800 and is a 2 1/2-story, weatherboard dwelling with a two-story portico adapted from the Greek Revival. It has a closed brick foundation and a gable roof. The portico is supported by two square wooden pillars set outside a pair of smaller pillars. According to local tradition, the house served as a stagecoach stop and post office before the founding of Batesburg.

It was listed on the National Register of Historic Places in 1982.
