= Hartley Hartley-Smith =

English cricketer

Personal information
- Full name: Hartley Hartley-Smith
- Born: 30 June 1852; Hammersmith, London, England
- Died: 21 March 1905 (aged 52); Upwey, Dorset, England
- Batting: Unknown
- Role: Wicket-keeper

Domestic team information
- Years: Team
- 1889: Sussex
- 1880: Surrey

Career statistics
Competition	First-class
Matches	2
Runs scored	27
Batting average	6.75
100s/50s	–/–
Top score	11
Balls bowled	–
Wickets	–
Bowling average	–
5 wickets in innings	–
10 wickets in match	–
Best bowling	–
Catches/stumpings	2/1
- Source: Cricinfo, 14 July 2012

Hartley Hartley-Smith (30 July 1852 – 21 March 1905) was an English cricketer. Hartley-Smith's batting style is unknown, though it is known he fielded as a wicket-keeper. He was born at Hammersmith, London. He changed his name from Hartley Smith to Hartley Hartley-Smith in March 1881.

Hartley-Smith made a single first-class appearance for Surrey against Gloucestershire at The Oval in 1880. Surrey won the toss and elected to bat first, making 114 all out, with Smith scoring 11 runs before he was dismissed by William Woof. Gloucestershire were then dismissed for 84 in their first-innings, with Surrey then making 114 all out in their second-innings, during which Smith was run out for 6. This set Gloucestershire a target of 145 for victory, but were dismissed for 62 in their chase. He later made a second first-class appearance for Sussex against Kent in 1889 at the County Ground, Hove. Kent won the toss and elected to bat first, making 258 all out, with Hartley-Smith taking two catches and making a single stumping. Sussex were then dismissed for just 97 in their first-innings, with Hartley-Smith contributing 10 runs to the total before being dismissed by Walter Wright. Forced to follow-on in their second-innings, Sussex made 123 all out, with Hartley-Smith the last man out, dismissed for a duck by Wright. Kent won the match by an innings and 38 runs.

He died at Upwey, Dorset, on 21 March 1905.
