= Richard Hartley =

Richard Hartley may refer to:

- Richard Gordon Hartley (1939–2016), Australian civil engineer and historian
- Richard I. Hartley, Australian computer scientist
- Richard Neville Hartley (born 1944), English composer
- Dick Hartley, college football player
