= Charles Augustus Hartley =

British civil engineer

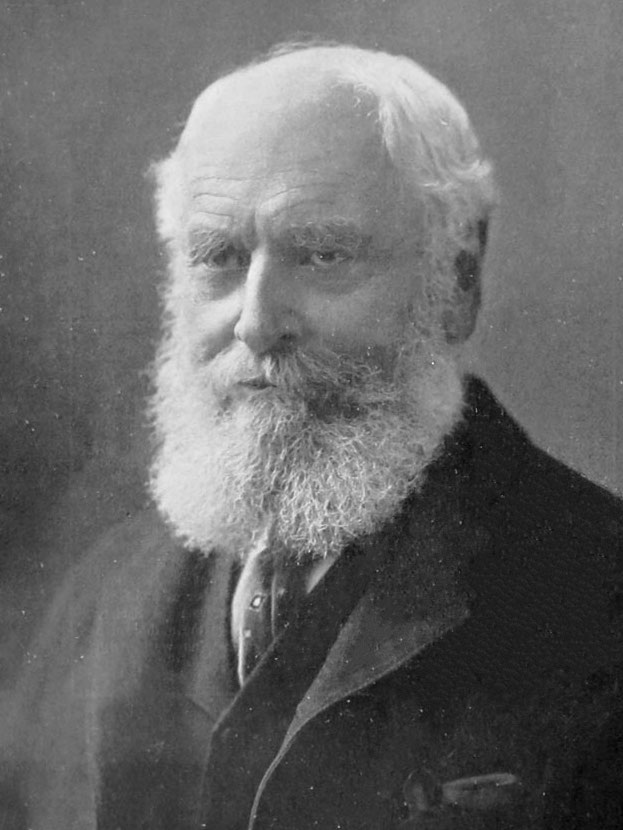
Charles Augustus Hartley by Carl Vandyk

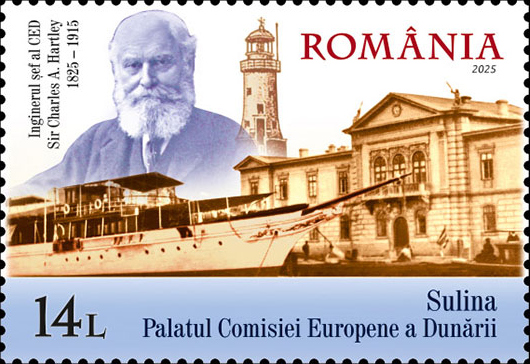
Hartley on a 2025 stamp of Romania

Sir Charles Augustus Hartley KCMG FRSE MICE (3 February 1825 – 20 February 1915) was an eminent British civil engineer in the Victorian era. Due to his extensive work mapping the longest river in western Europe, he became known as 'The Father of the Danube.'

== Biography ==
Hartley was born in 1825 at Heworth, Gateshead, County Durham. He was educated at Bishop Auckland then Leeds.

Like most engineers of his generation he was engaged in railway work in the early part of his career, being employed by the Scottish Central Railway. Subsequently, he devoted himself to hydraulic engineering and the improvement of estuaries and harbors for the purposes of navigation. From 1848 to 1855 he was employed overseeing the construction of Sutton harbour. He was employed in connection with some of the largest and most important waterways of the world, including the early work (1861) on the Suez Canal and Odessa Harbour in 1867.

After serving in the Crimean War (1853 – Feb 1856) as a captain of engineers in the Anglo-Turkish contingent, he was appointed engineer-in-chief for the works carried out by the European Commission of the Danube for improving the navigation at the mouths of that river, and that position he retained till 1872, when he became consulting engineer to the commission. In 1875, he was one of the committee appointed by the authority of the United States Congress to report on the works necessary to form and maintain a deep channel through the south pass of the Mississippi Delta; and in 1884 the British government nominated him a member of the international technical commission for widening the Suez Canal. In addition, he was consulted by the British and other governments in connection with many other river and harbour works, including the improvement of the navigation of the Scheldt, Hooghly, Don, and Dnieper, and of the ports of Odessa, Trieste, Kustendjie (at present Constanţa), Burgas, Varna, and Durban.

In 1869 he was created a Fellow of the Royal Society of Edinburgh, his proposer being David Stevenson. He was knighted in 1862 and made K.C.M.G. in 1884.

He was an active member of the Institution of Civil Engineers and for his written papers was awarded their Telford, Watt, and Stephenson medals. He also received the Albert Medal from the Society of Arts in 1913 in recognition of his public service.

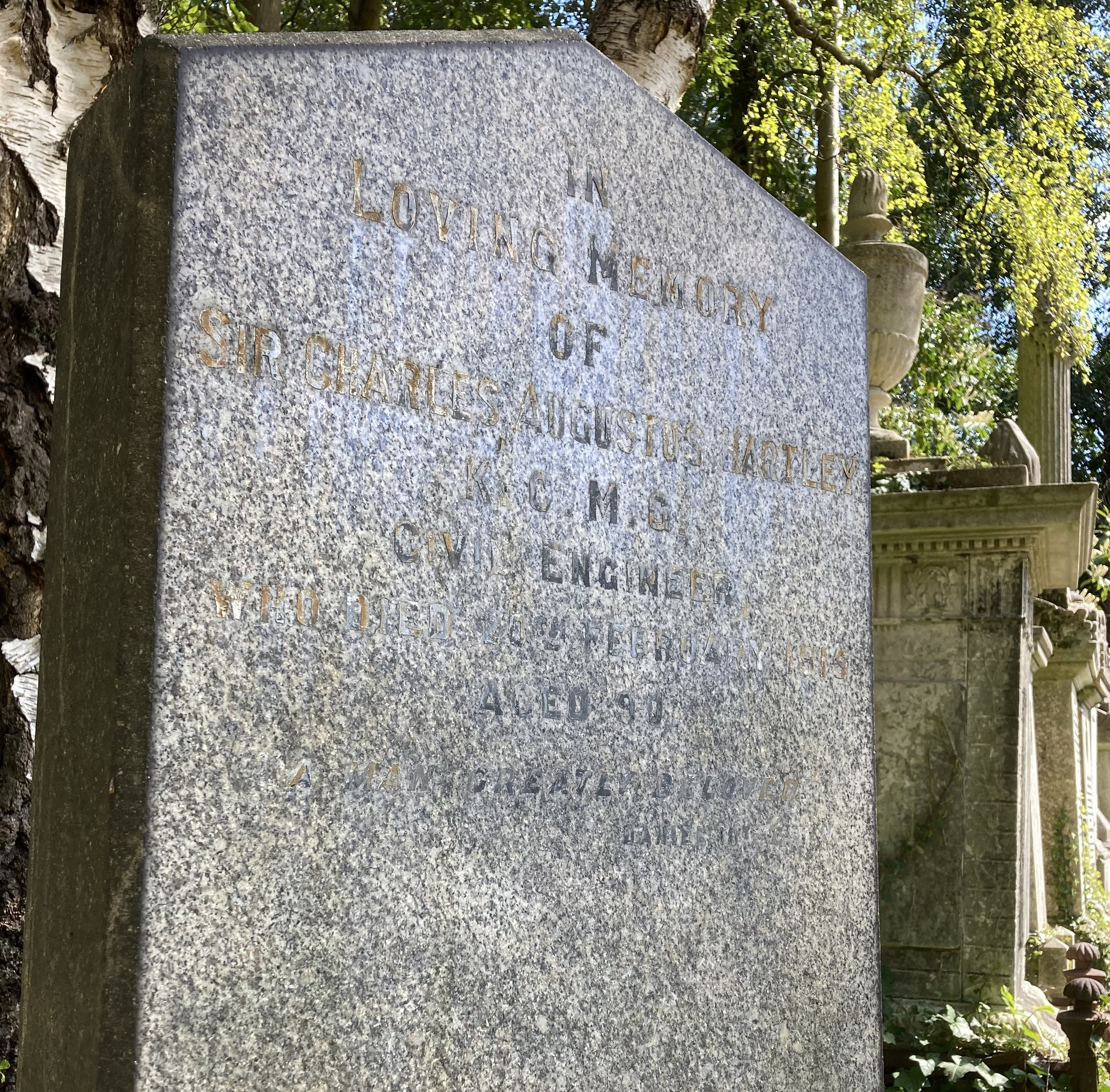
Grave of Sir Charles Augustus Hartley in Highgate Cemetery

In 1907 he was made an honorary member of the Romanian Academy.

He died on 20 February 1915 and was buried on the west side of Highgate Cemetery.

== Works ==
- Description of the Delta of the Danube (1874)
- Notes on Public Works in the United States and Canada (1875)
