= David Hartley (cricketer) =

English cricketer (born 1963)

Personal information
- Full name: David James Benedict Hartley
- Born: 28 March 1963 (age 63); Ruscombe, Berkshire, England
- Batting: Right-handed
- Bowling: Leg break

Domestic team information
- Years: Team
- 1987–2000: Berkshire

Career statistics
Competition	LA
Matches	7
Runs scored	8
Batting average	2.66
100s/50s	–/–
Top score	8
Balls bowled	368
Wickets	4
Bowling average	75.25
5 wickets in innings	–
10 wickets in match	–
Best bowling	2/35
Catches/stumpings	3/–
- Source: Cricinfo, 15 September 2010

David James Benedict Hartley (born 28 March 1963) is a former English List A cricketer. Hartley was a right-handed batsman who bowled leg break. He was born at Ruscombe, Berkshire.

In 1982, Hartley played 3 Second XI Championship fixtures for the Middlesex Second XI, but this did not earn him a contract with the county.

Hartley made his Minor Counties Championship debut for Berkshire in 1987 against Cornwall. From 1987 to 2000, he represented the county in 65 Minor Counties Championship matches, the last of which came in the 2000 Championship when Berkshire played Wales Minor Counties. Hartley also played in the MCCA Knockout Trophy for Berkshire. His debut in that competition came in 1988 when Berkshire played Oxfordshire. From 1988 to 1997, he represented the county in 5 Trophy matches, the last of which came when Berkshire played Shropshire in the 1997 MCCA Knockout Trophy.

Additionally, he also played List-A matches for Berkshire. His List-A debut for the county came against Yorkshire in the 1988 NatWest Trophy. From 1988 to 1997, he represented the county in 7 List-A matches, with his final List-A match coming in the 1997 NatWest Trophy when Berkshire played Lancashire at Old Trafford. In his 7 matches, he scored 8 runs at a batting average of 2.66, with a high score of 8. With the ball he took 4 wickets at a bowling average of 75.25, with best figures of 2/35.
