= David Hartley (politician) =

American politician (born 1942)

Member of the Ohio House of Representatives from the 73rd district
- In office January 3, 1973 – December 31, 1998
- Preceded by: John Baker
- Succeeded by: Ron Rhine

Personal details
- Born: December 16, 1942 (age 83)
- Party: Democratic

David Hartley (born December 16, 1942) is an American politician who served as a Democratic member of the Ohio House of Representatives from 1973 to 1998. Hartley also served as a county commissioner for Clark County, Ohio, from 2004 to 2015.

Hartley graduated from the University of Louisville where he was a member of Tau Kappa Epsilon fraternity.
