= Bill Hartley (activist) =

Australian political activist

- Born: 26 October 1930
- Died: 18 February 2006 (aged 75)
- Occupation: Political activist
- Known for: State Secretary of the Victorian branch of the Australian Labor Party between 1965 and 1970

William Henry Hartley (26 October 1930 – 18 February 2006) was an Australian political activist who was State Secretary of the Victorian branch of the Australian Labor Party between 1965 and 1970.

Hartley was born in Southern Cross, Western Australia and before his involvement in left-wing politics, he was a Young Liberal and was active in the University of Western Australia's Liberal Club. He also edited the student newspaper. Service in the RAAF in the early 1950s, combined with the Suez Crisis and the Split in the Labor movement, radicalised Hartley and he joined the ALP in 1956. After this, he combined his journalism with his new politics, becoming co-editor of the ALP's WA newspaper, the Western Sun.

Hartley lost his position as State Secretary when formal intervention in the Victorian branch by the Federal ALP Executive led to the replacement of the Victorian Central Executive of the Party in October 1970. He remained a leading figure within the Victorian ALP's Socialist Left faction until his expulsion in 1986.

He was a radio broadcaster from 1978 to 1995 on community radio 3CR with a left-wing programme called Par Avion.

He gained later public attention following his involvement with Gough Whitlam and David Combe in attempts to raise large sums of money for the Labor Party from the Iraqi Ba'ath Party (later led by Saddam Hussein) in 1975, and for his outspoken views on a variety of issues, particularly the Middle East conflict.

Hartley died in Geraldton, Western Australia, aged 75.
