= John Hartley (poet) =

English poet

John Hartley (1839–1915) was an English poet who worked in the Yorkshire dialect. He wrote a great deal of prose and poetry – often of a sentimental nature – dealing with the poverty of the district. He was born in Halifax, West Riding of Yorkshire.

Hartley wrote and edited the Original Illuminated Clock Almanack from 1866 to his death.

Most of Hartley's works are written in dialect.

Hartley wrote a number of books featuring the character "Sammywell Grimes", who has a number of adventures and suffers unfortunate mishaps.

== Works ==
- Yorkshire Ditties, First Series
- Yorkshire Ditties, Second Series
- Yorkshire Tales, First Series
- Yorkshire Tales, Second Series
- Yorkshire Tales, Third Series
- Yorkshire Lyrics (1898)
- Pensive Poems and Startling Stories
- A Rolling Stone. A Tale of Wrongs and Revenge
- Mally An' Me : A selection of Humorous and Pathetic Incidents from the Life of Sammywell Grimes and His Wife Mally (1902)
- Yorksher Puddin (1876)
- A Sheaf from the Moorland - A Collection of Original Poems
- Grimes' Visit To Th' Queen. A Royal Time Amang Royalties
- Seets I'Lundun: A Yorkshireman's Ten Days' Trip
- Seets i' Yorkshire and Lancashire or Grimes' Comical Trip from Leeds to Liverpool by Canal
- Seets i' Blackpool - Grimes at the Seaside
- Seets i' Paris - Sammywell Grimes’s trip with his old chum Billy Baccus; his opinion o’th' French, and th' French opinion o’th' exhibition he made ov hissen.
- Grimes' Trip to America - Ten letters from Sammywell to John Jones Smith
- Sammywell Grimes An' his Wife Mally Laikin I' Lakeland: A Humorous Account of their Visit to the Home of Famous Poets, &c., &c.
