= Charles Hartley (educationist) =

British educationist

Charles Hartley (12 February 1865 – 26 Jan 1935) was a British educationist and the Principal of Royal College, Colombo (1903–1919).

Born in Beccles, Suffolk, he was educated at Fauconberg Grammar School, Beccles, then at Marlborough College (1879–1883). He went on to Magdalene College, Cambridge, captaining Magdalen College Cricket Team and graduating B.A. in 1887.

Starting a career in teaching he became the classics master of Cathedral School, Worcester; modern language and classics master at Christ college Brecon and later at Marlborough College. In September 1896 he joined the teaching staff of Royal College as lecturer in modern languages and English and was the acting principal in October 1897 to August 1898. He was appointed principal in June 1903 and served till May 1919. In 1915, during World War I, he served as the assistant censor in Ceylon (German) and was the acting director of public instruction in 1910.

During his tenure as principal Hartley overcome efforts to abolish the Royal College between 1908 and 1916. An enthusiastic yachtsmen, he owned the yacht "Fiona" and was the Hon. Secretary Colombo Sailing Club. He died in British Columbia, Canada.
