= Elizabeth Hartley (Girl Guides) =

English Girl Guiding activist (1906–1996)

Elizabeth Hartley OBE
- Born: Clarita Elizabeth Hartley; 1 February 1906; London, England
- Died: March 1996 (aged 90); Tavistock, Devon, England
- Occupations: Girl Guide leader Author

Clarita Elizabeth Hartley, OBE (1 February 1906 – March 1996) was active in the Girl Guiding movement both in the United Kingdom and internationally.

Hartley joined the Guiding movement as a Guider in 1925. She was a Guider-in-Charge at Foxlease and also held numerous committee positions at a national level within the Girl Guide Association (now Girlguiding UK).

Hartley was a volunteer with the Guide International Service, working in post-war Germany.

In 1969 she was vice-chair of the WAGGGS' 20th World Conference in Finland. She was awarded the Silver Fish. Hartley succeeded Mona Burgin as leader of the Training Team of the World Association Training scheme. Hartley authored several works about Guiding.

== Works ==
- 1963: Not More than Eight
- 1968: A Handbook for Commissioners
- 1975: Olave Baden-Powell

== See also ==
- Olave Baden-Powell
- Alice Behrens
- Alix Liddell
