= Hartley Lobban =

English cricketer

Personal information
- Born: 9 May 1926; Jamaica
- Died: 15 October 2004 (aged 78); Vancouver, British Columbia, Canada
- Batting: Right-handed
- Bowling: Right-arm fast

Career statistics
Competition	First-class
Matches	17
Runs scored	81
Batting average	6.75
100s/50s	0/0
Top score	18
Balls bowled	2,428
Wickets	47
Bowling average	30.89
5 wickets in innings	4
10 wickets in match	0
Best bowling	6-51
Catches/stumpings	4/0
- Source: Cricinfo

Hartley W Lobban (9 May 1926 – 15 October 2004) was a Jamaican-born first-class cricketer who played 17 matches for Worcestershire in the early 1950s.

== Life and career ==
Lobban played little cricket in Jamaica. He went to England at the end of World War II as a member of the Royal Air Force, and settled in Kidderminster in Worcestershire in 1947, where he worked as a civilian lorry driver for the RAF. He began playing for Kidderminster Cricket Club in the Birmingham League, and at the start of the 1952 season, opening the bowling for the club's senior team, he had figures of 7 for 9 and 7 for 37.

Worcestershire invited him to play for them, and he made his first-class debut against Sussex in July 1952. He took five wickets in the match (his maiden victim being Ken Suttle) and then held on for 4 not out with Peter Richardson (20 not out) to add the 12 runs needed for a one-wicket victory after his county had collapsed from 192 for 2 to 238 for 9. A week later he claimed four wickets against Warwickshire, then a few days later still he managed 6 for 52 (five of his victims bowled) in what was otherwise a disastrous innings defeat to Derbyshire. In the last match of the season he took a career-best 6 for 51 against Glamorgan; he and Reg Perks (4 for 59) bowled unchanged throughout the first innings. Worcestershire won the game and Lobban finished the season with 23 wickets at 23.69.

He took 23 wickets again in 1953, but at a considerably worse average of 34.43, and had only two really successful games: against Oxford University in June, when he took 5 for 70, and then against Sussex in July. On this occasion Lobban claimed eight wickets, his most in a match, including 6 for 103 in the first innings. He also made his highest score with the bat, 18, but Sussex won by five wickets.

In 1954 Lobban made only two first-class appearances, and managed only the single wicket of Gloucestershire tail-ender Bomber Wells. In his final game, against Warwickshire at Dudley, his nine first-innings overs cost 51. He bowled just two overs in the second innings as Warwickshire completed an easy ten-wicket win. Lobban played one more Second XI game, against Glamorgan II at Cardiff Arms Park; in this he picked up five wickets.

He was also a professional boxer and played rugby union for Kidderminster.

He later moved to Canada, where he worked as a teacher in Burnaby, British Columbia. He and his wife Celia had a son and two daughters.
