= Charlie Hartley (Lancashire cricketer) =

American-born English cricketer

Charles Robert Hartley (13 February 1873 – 14 November 1927) was a USA-born English cricketer active from 1897 to 1909 who played for Lancashire. He was born in New Orleans and died in Sale, Cheshire. He appeared in 106 first-class matches as a righthanded batsman, scoring 3,729 runs with a highest score of 139 among four centuries and held 56 catches.
