= Marsden Hartley =

American Modernist painter (1877–1943)

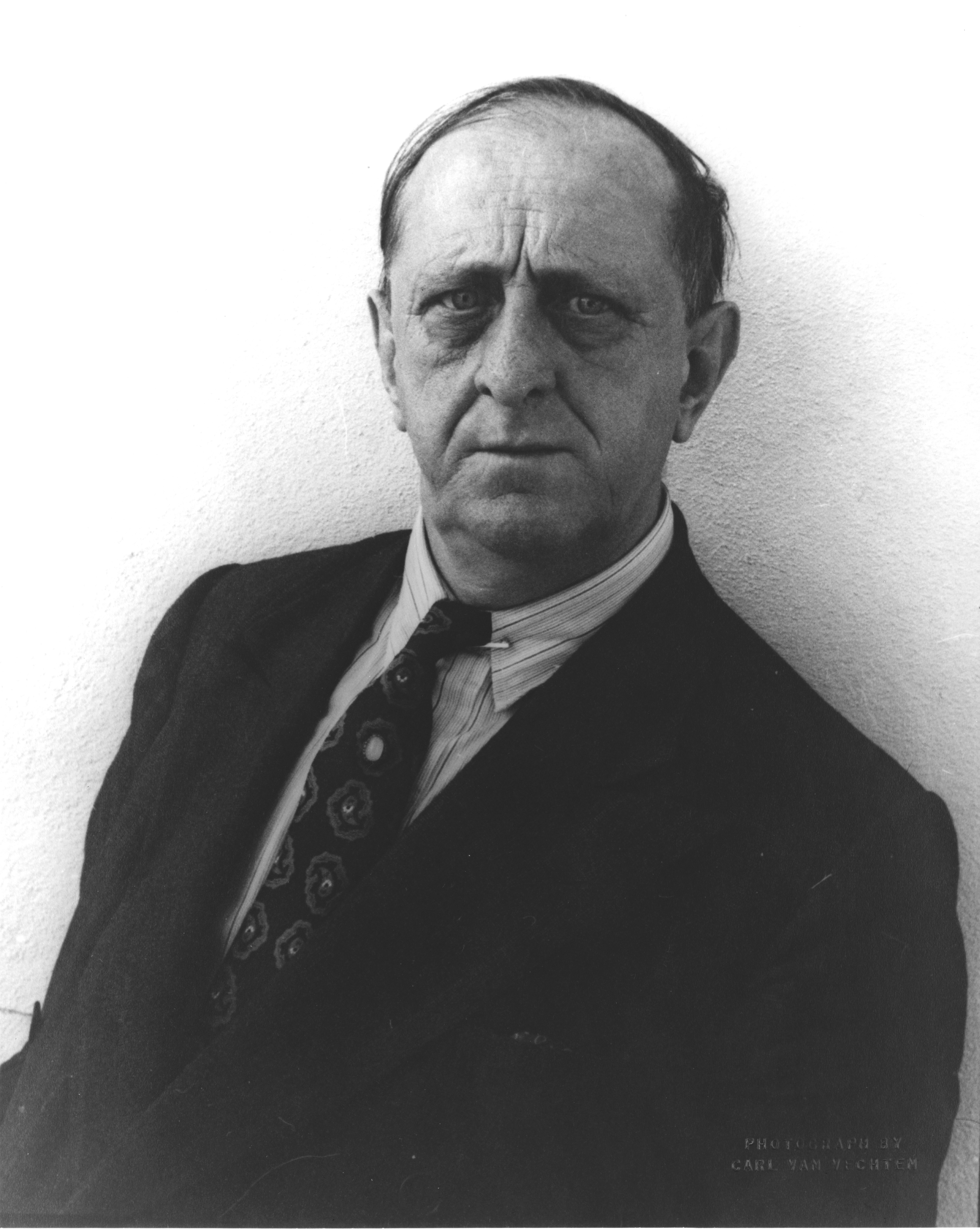
- Hartley in 1939
- Born: Edmund Hartley; January 4, 1877; Lewiston, Maine, U.S.
- Died: September 2, 1943 (aged 66); Ellsworth, Maine, U.S.
- Education: Cleveland Institute of Art, Parsons School of Design, National Academy of Design
- Known for: Painting
- Movement: American Modernism

Marsden Hartley (January 4, 1877 – September 2, 1943) was an American Modernist painter, poet, and essayist. Hartley developed his painting abilities by observing Cubist artists in Paris and Berlin.

== Early life and education ==
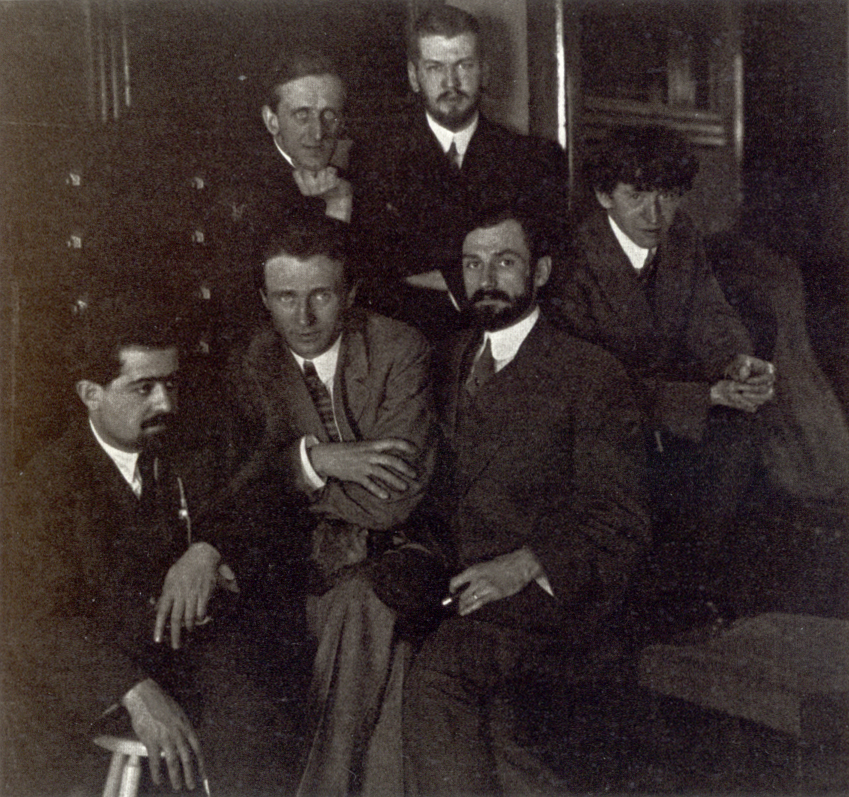
Front row, left to right: Jo Davidson, Edward Steichen, Arthur B. Carles, John Marin; back row: Marsden Hartley, Laurence Fellows, c. 1911, Bates College Museum of Art

Hartley was born in Lewiston, Maine, where his English parents had settled. He was the youngest of nine children. His mother died when he was eight, and his father remarried four years later to Martha Marsden. His birth name was Edmund Hartley; he later assumed Marsden as his first name when he was in his early twenties. A few years after his mother's death when Hartley was 14, his sisters moved to Ohio, leaving him behind in Maine with his father where he worked in a shoe factory for a year. These bleak occurrences led Hartley to recall his New England childhood as a time of painful loneliness, so much so that in a letter to Alfred Stieglitz, he once described the New England accent as "a sad recollection [that] rushed into my very flesh like sharpened knives".

After he joined his family in Cleveland, Ohio, in 1892, Hartley began his art training at the Cleveland School of Art, where he held a scholarship.

In 1898, at the age of 22, Hartley moved to New York City to study painting at the New York School of Art under William Merritt Chase, and then attended the National Academy of Design. Hartley was a great admirer of Albert Pinkham Ryder and visited his studio in Greenwich Village as often as possible. His friendship with Ryder, in addition to the writings of Walt Whitman and American transcendentalists Henry David Thoreau and Ralph Waldo Emerson, inspired Hartley to view art as a spiritual quest.

== Maturation and New York exhibitions ==
From 1900 to 1910, Hartley spent his summers in Lewiston and the region of Western Maine near the village of Lovell. He considered the paintings he produced there—of Kezar Lake, the hillsides, and mountains—his first mature works. These paintings so impressed New York photographer and art promoter Alfred Stieglitz that he agreed on the spot to give Hartley his first solo exhibition at Stieglitz's art gallery 291 in 1909. Hartley continued to exhibit his work at 291 and Stieglitz's other galleries until 1937. Stieglitz also provided Hartley's introduction to European modernist painters, of whom Cézanne, Picasso, Kandinsky, and Matisse would prove the most influential upon him.

== Hartley in Europe ==
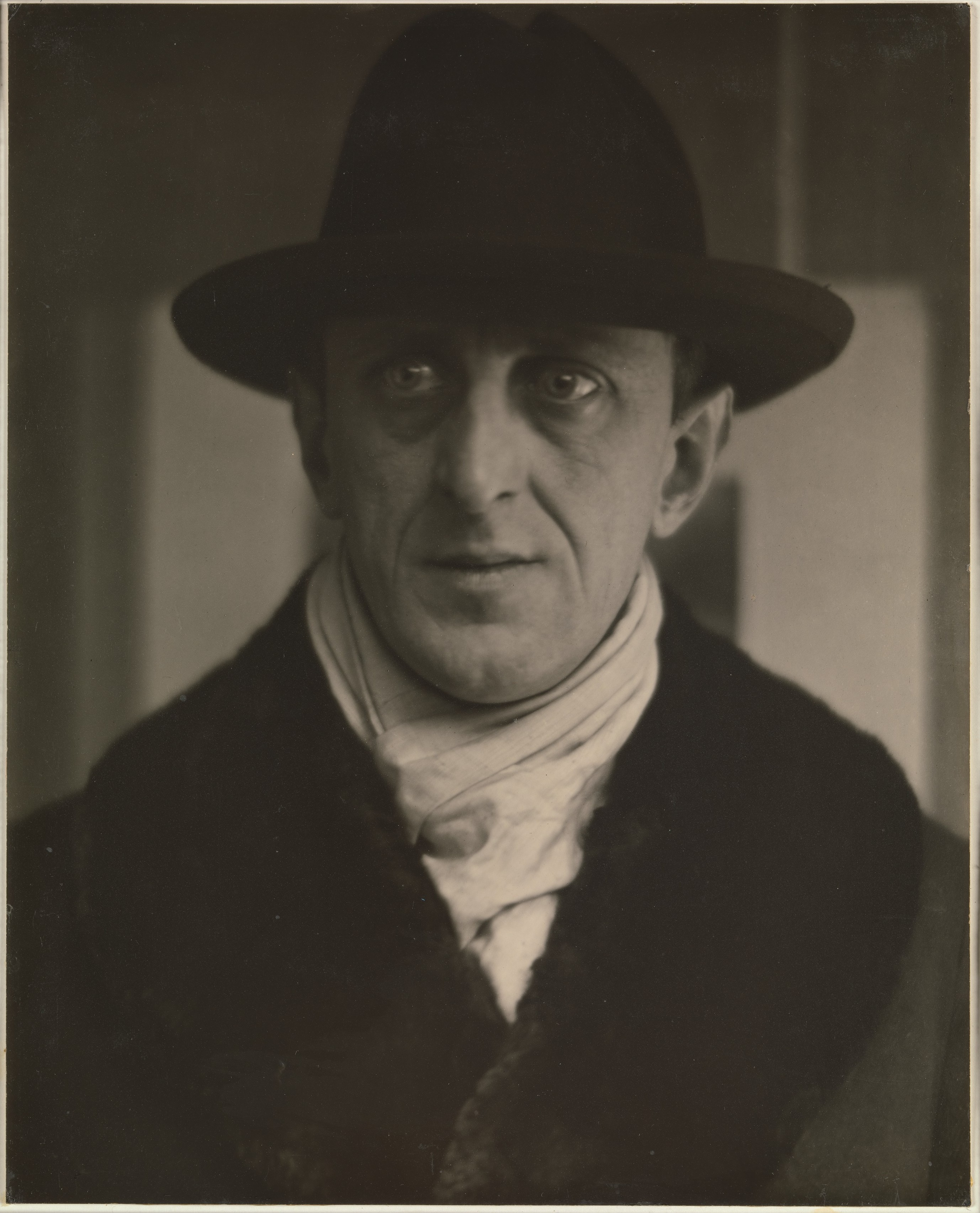
Photograph of Hartley by Alfred Stieglitz at the Metropolitan Museum of Art, gelatin silver print, 24.8 x 19.8cm, 1916

Hartley traveled to Europe for the first time in April 1912, and he became acquainted with Gertrude Stein's circle of avant-garde writers and artists in Paris. Stein, along with Hart Crane and Sherwood Anderson, encouraged Hartley to write as well as paint.

In a letter to Alfred Stieglitz, Hartley explains his disenchantment of living abroad in Paris. A single year has passed since he began living overseas. "Like every other human being I have longings which through tricks of circumstances have been left unsatisfied... and the pain grows stronger instead of less and it leaves one nothing but the role of spectator in life watching life go by—having no part of it but that of spectator." Hartley wanted to live within the noiseless countryside and an invigorating city.

=== Germany ===
In April 1913 Hartley relocated to Berlin, the capital of the German Empire where he continued to paint, and became friends with the painters Wassily Kandinsky and Franz Marc. He also collected Bavarian folk art. His work during this period was a combination of abstraction and German Expressionism, fueled by his personal brand of mysticism. Many of Hartley's Berlin paintings were further inspired by the German military pageantry then on display, though his view of this subject changed after the outbreak of World War I, once war was no longer "a romantic but a real reality".

Two of Hartley's Cézanne-inspired still life paintings and six charcoal drawings were selected to be included in the landmark 1913 Armory Show in New York.

In Berlin, Hartley developed a close relationship with a Prussian lieutenant, Karl von Freyburg, who was the cousin of Hartley's friend Arnold Ronnebeck. References to Freyburg were a recurring motif in Hartley's work, most notably in Portrait of a German Officer (1914). Freyburg's subsequent death during the war hit Hartley hard, and he afterward idealized their relationship. Many scholars interpreted his work regarding Freyburg as embodying homosexual feelings for him. Hartley lived in Berlin until December 1915.

Hartley returned to the U.S. from Berlin as a German sympathizer following World War I. Hartley created paintings with much German iconography. The homoerotic tones were overlooked as critics focused on the German point of view. According to Arthur Lubow, Hartley was disingenuous in arguing that there was "no hidden symbolism whatsoever".

== Later years, return to the U.S., and "the painter of Maine" ==
Hartley finally returned to the U.S. in early 1916. Following World War I he was obliged to return to the United States. Upon his return Hartley painted Handsome Drinks. The drinkware calls back to the gatherings hosted by Gertrude Stein, where Hartley met Pablo Picasso, and Robert Delaunay. From 1916 to 1921 Hartley lived and worked in Provincetown, Bermuda, New York, and New Mexico.

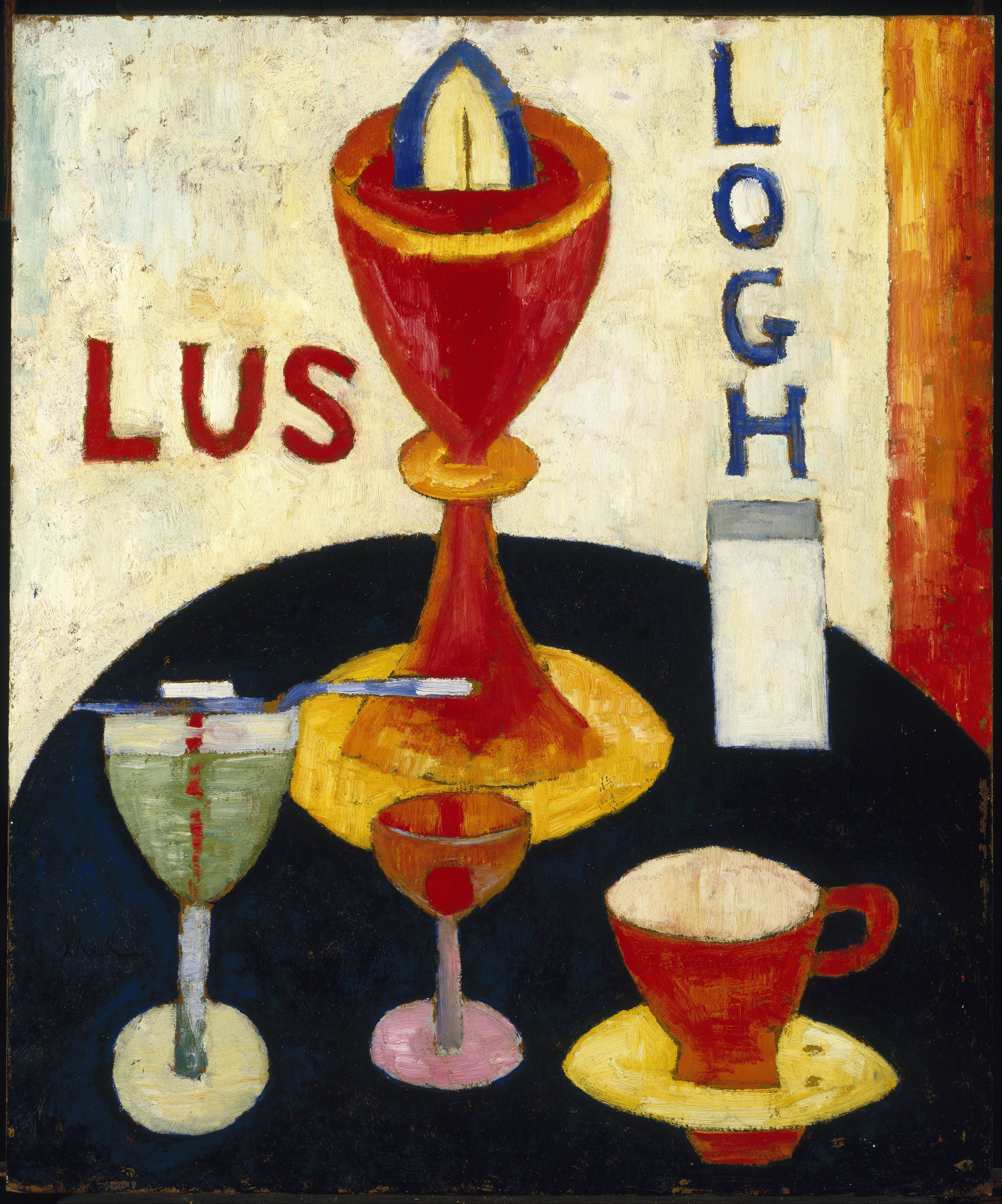
Marsden Hartley, Handsome Drinks, 1916, oil on composition board, 61 x 50.8 cm, Brooklyn Museum, New York

After raising money through an auction of over 100 of his paintings and pastels at the Anderson Gallery, New York in 1921, Hartley returned to Europe again where he remained through the 1920s, with occasional visits back to America. While following in the footsteps of Paul Cézanne, he created still lifes and landscapes in the drawing medium of silverpoint. In 1930 he spent the summer and fall painting mountains in New Hampshire, and in 1931 at what is known as Dogtown Common, near Gloucester, Massachusetts. Hartley was awarded a Guggenheim Fellowship, which he spent in Mexico from 1932 to 1933, followed by a year in the Bavarian Alps (1933–34). After a few months in Bermuda (1935), he traveled north by ship where he discovered a small fishing village in Blue Rocks, Nova Scotia and lived for two summers with the Francis Mason family of fishermen. In September 1936 the two Mason brothers drowned in a hurricane—an event that deeply affected Hartley and would later inspire an important series of portrait paintings and seascapes. He finally returned to Maine in 1937, after declaring that he wanted to become "the painter of Maine" and depict American life at a local level. For the remainder of his life, he worked in such Maine locations as Georgetown, Vinalhaven, Brooksville, Corea, and Mt. Katahdin until his death from congestive heart failure in Ellsworth in 1943. His ashes were scattered on the Androscoggin River.

Hartley was not overt about his homosexuality, often redirecting attention towards other aspects of his work. Works such as Portrait of a German Officer and Handsome Drinks are coded. The compositions honor lovers, friends, and inspirational sources. Hartley no longer felt unease at what people thought of his work once he reached his sixties. His figure paintings of athletic, muscular males, often nude or garbed only in briefs or thongs, became more intimate, such as Flaming American (Swim Champ), 1940 or Madawaska--Acadian Light-Heavy--Second Arrangement (both from 1940). As with Hartley's German officer paintings, his late paintings of virile males are now assessed in terms of his affirmation of his homosexuality.

== Important works ==
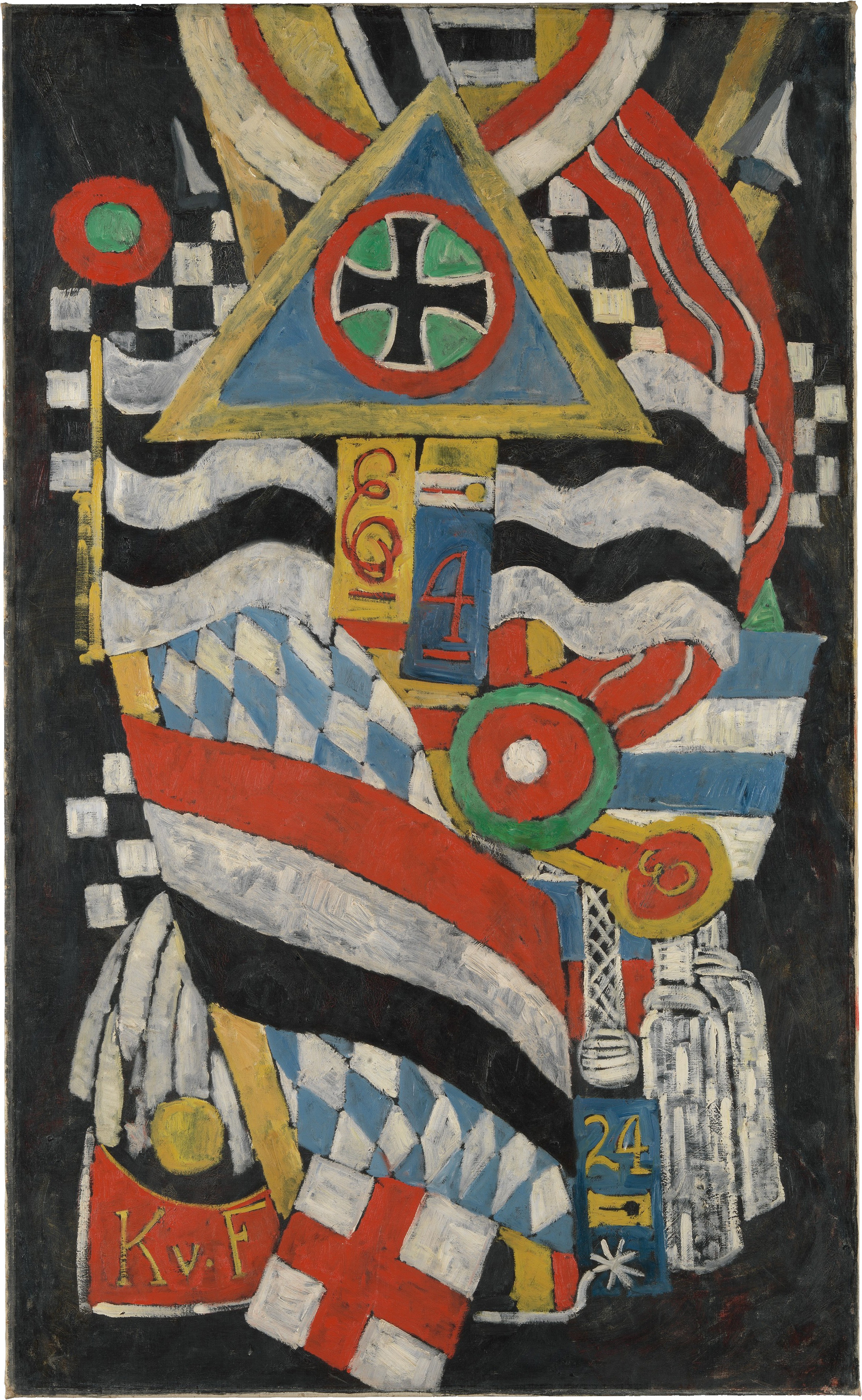
Marsden Hartley, Portrait of a German Officer, 1914, oil on canvas, 173.4 x 105.1 cm, Metropolitan Museum of Art, New York

=== Portrait of a German Officer (1914) ===
In a personal memoir that was not finished, Hartley wrote "I began somehow to have curiosity about art at the time when sex consciousness is fully developed and as I did not incline to concrete escapades. I of course inclined to abstract ones, and the collecting of objects which is a sex expression took the upper hand." Hartley's use of object abstraction became the motif for his paintings that commemorate his "love object", Karl von Freyburg. According to Meryl Doney, Hartley conveyed his emotions regarding his friend's traits in his paintings through everyday items. In this painting the Iron Cross, the Flag of Bavaria and the German flag are attributes to Karl von Freyburg, along with the yellow '24', the age he was when he died.

== Selected paintings ==
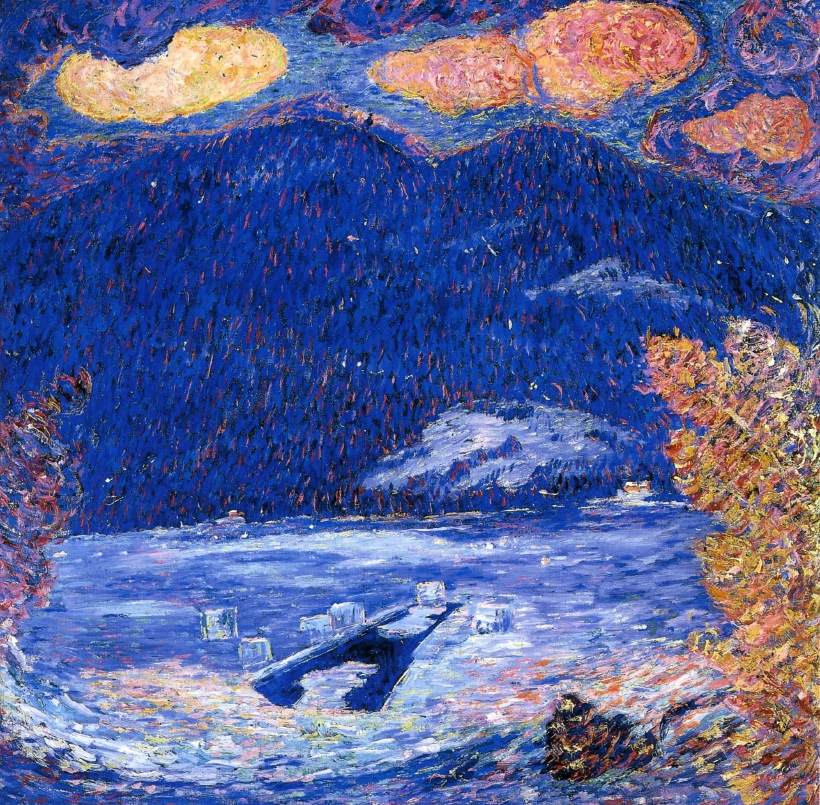
The Ice Hole, 1908, New Orleans Museum of Art

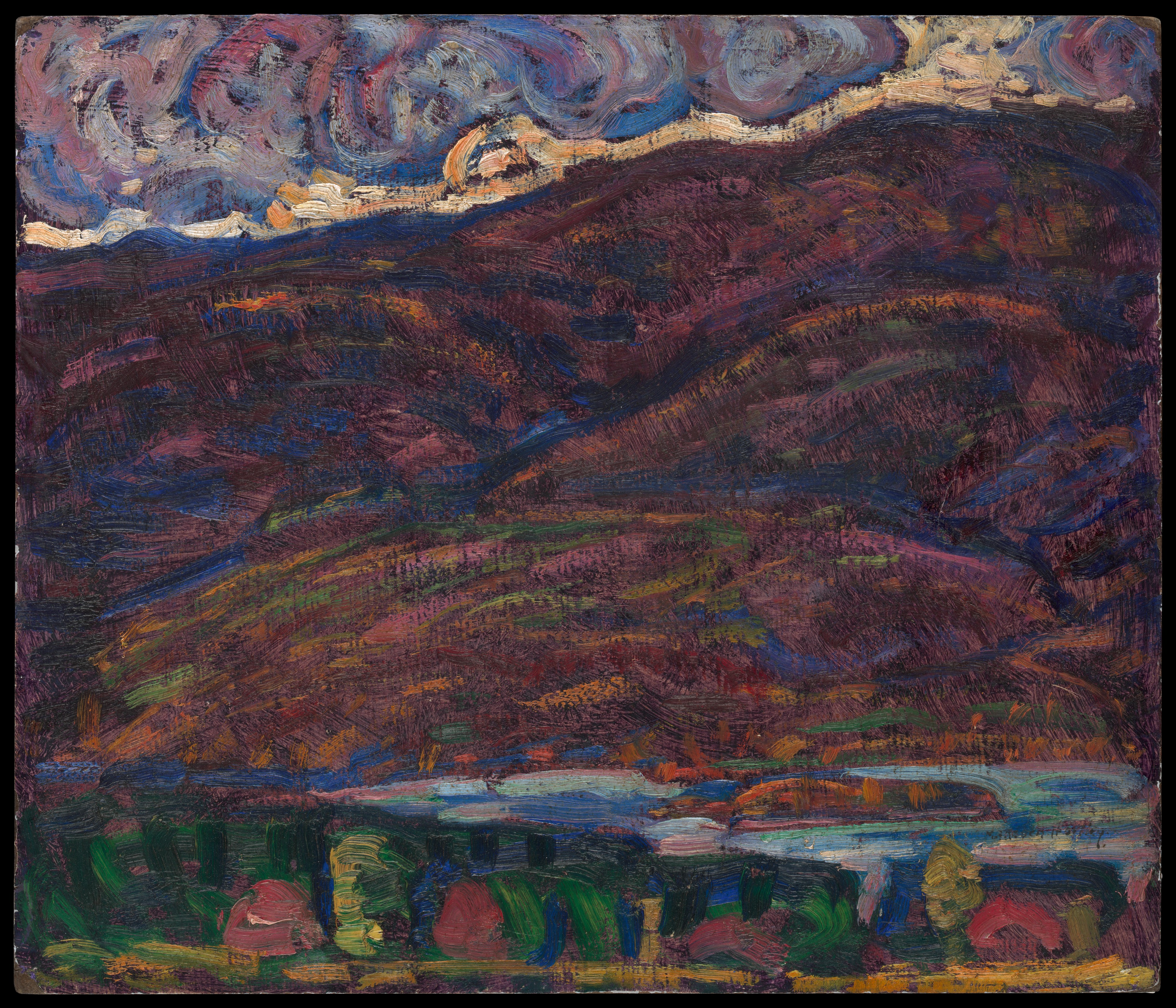
Autumn Color, ca. 1910, Metropolitan Museum of Art

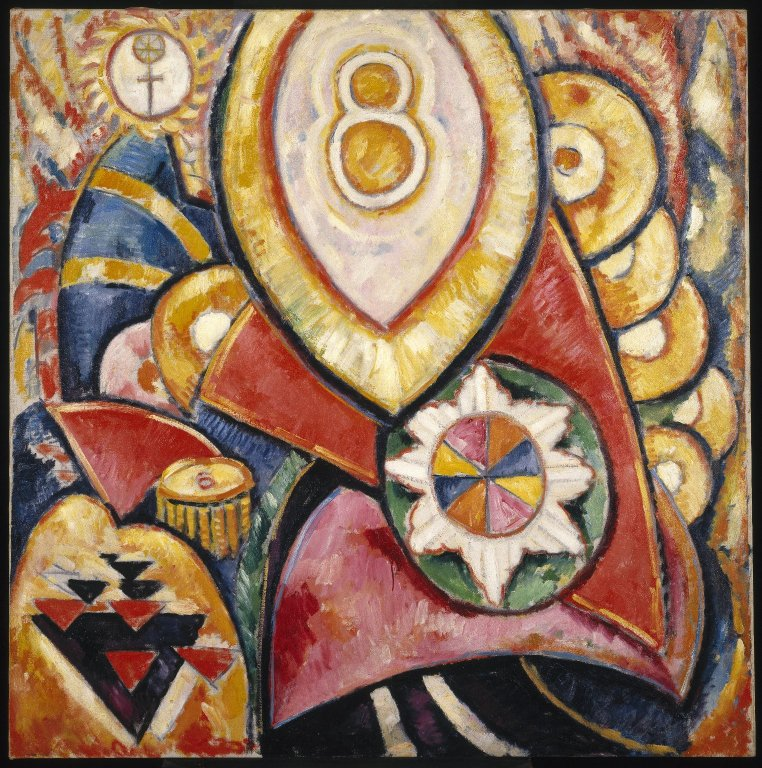
Painting No. 48, 1913, Brooklyn Museum

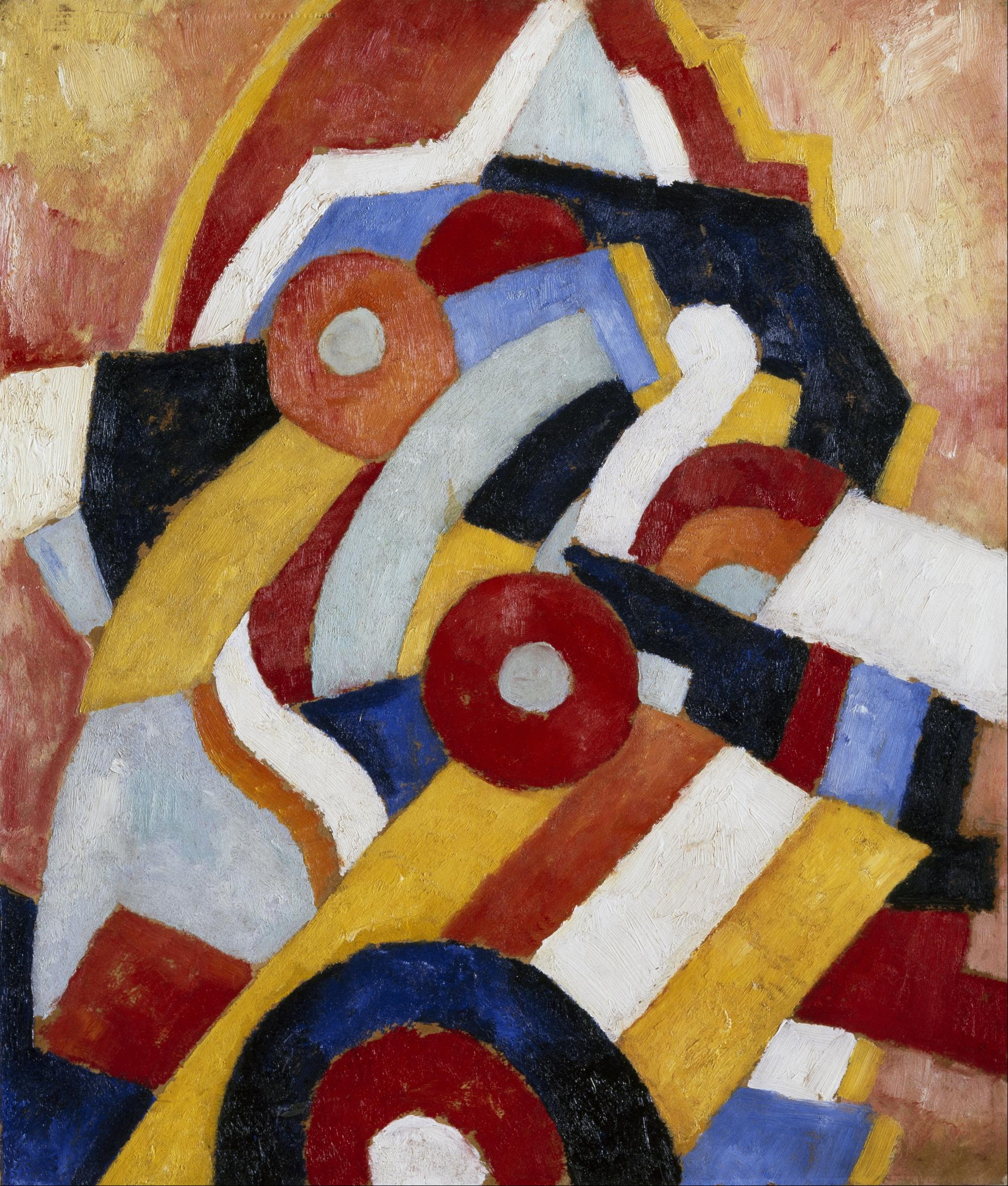
Abstraction, ca. 1914, Museum of Fine Arts, Houston

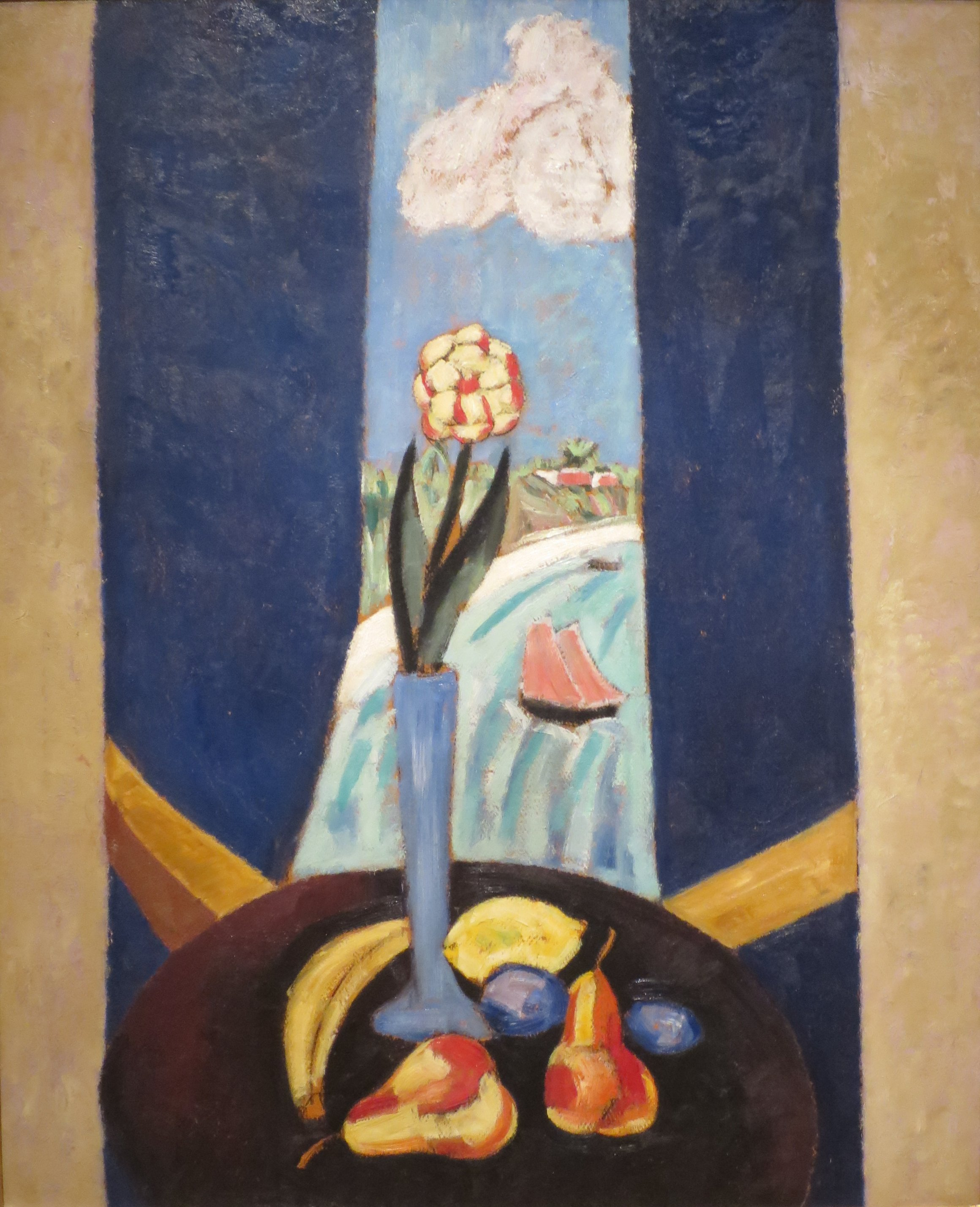
A Bermuda Window in a Semi-Tropic Character, 1917, De Young Museum

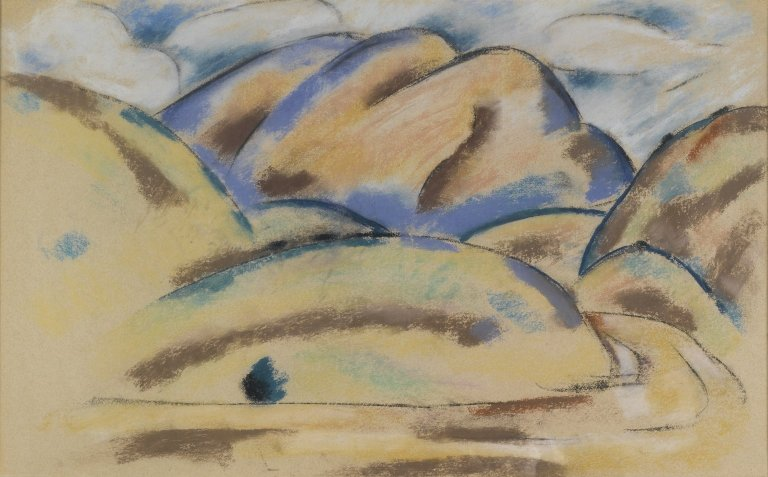
Landscape, New Mexico, 1916–1920, Brooklyn Museum

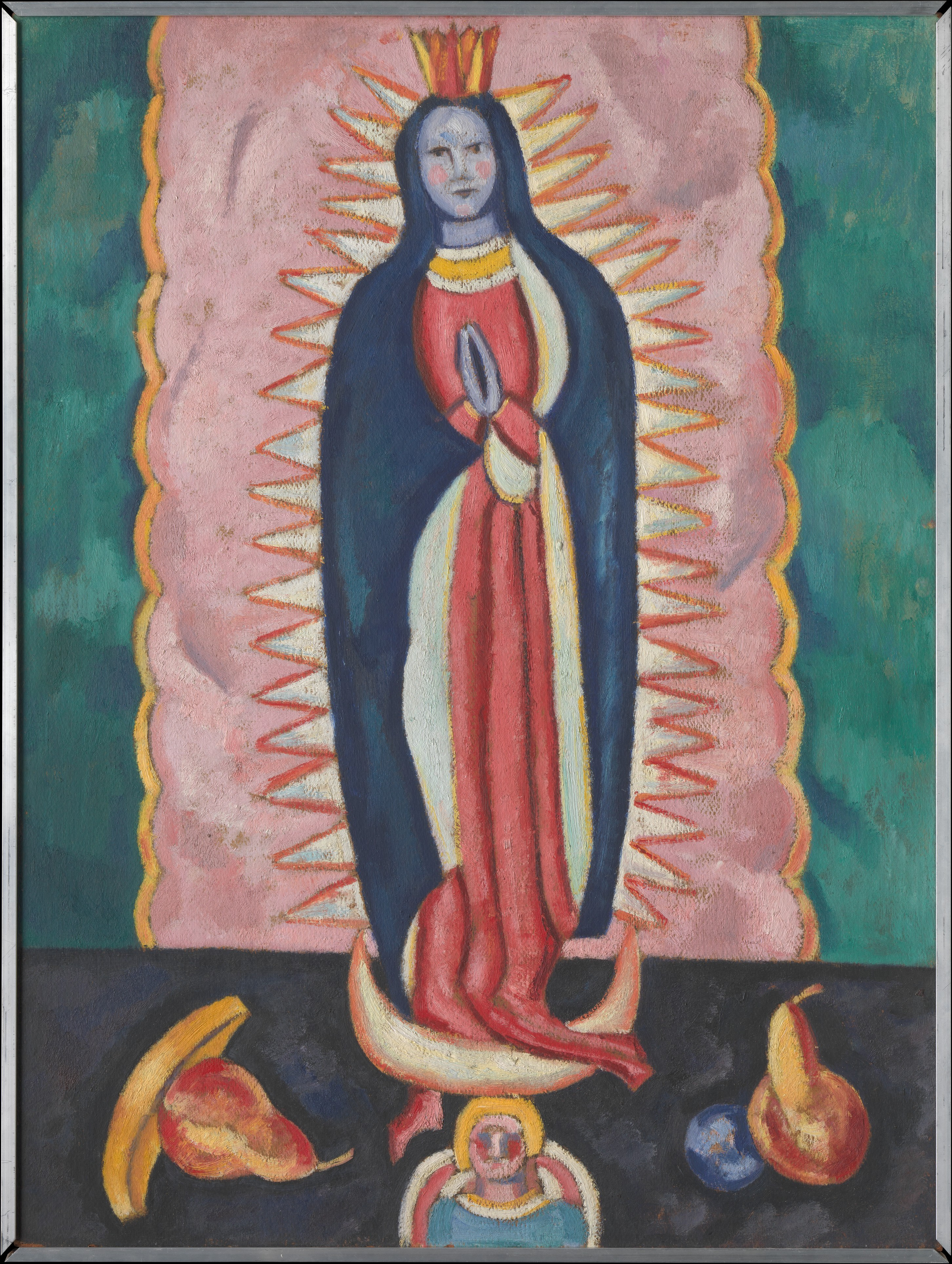
The Virgin of Guadalupe, 1918–1920, Metropolitan Museum of Art

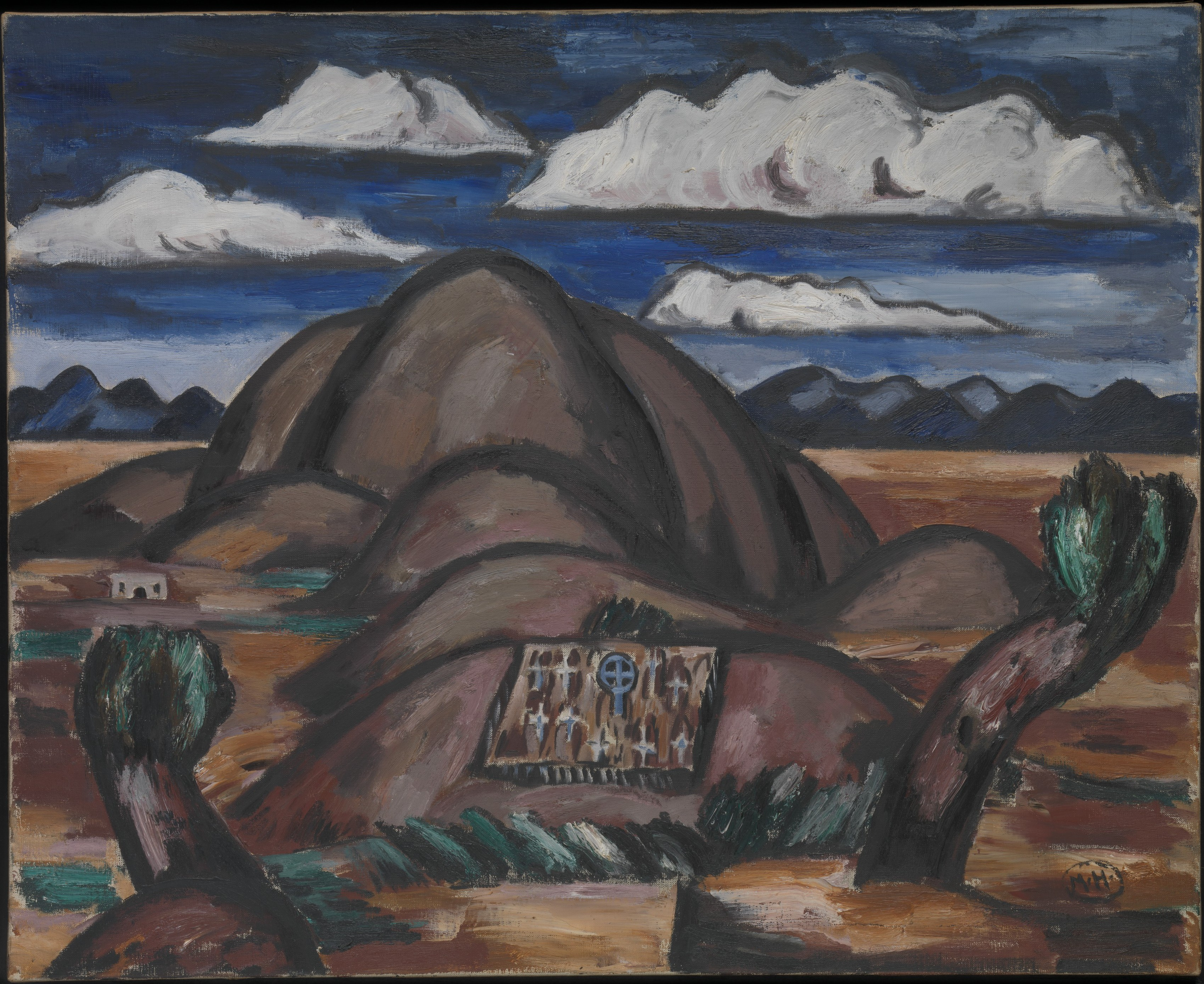
Cemetery, New Mexico, 1924, Metropolitan Museum of Art

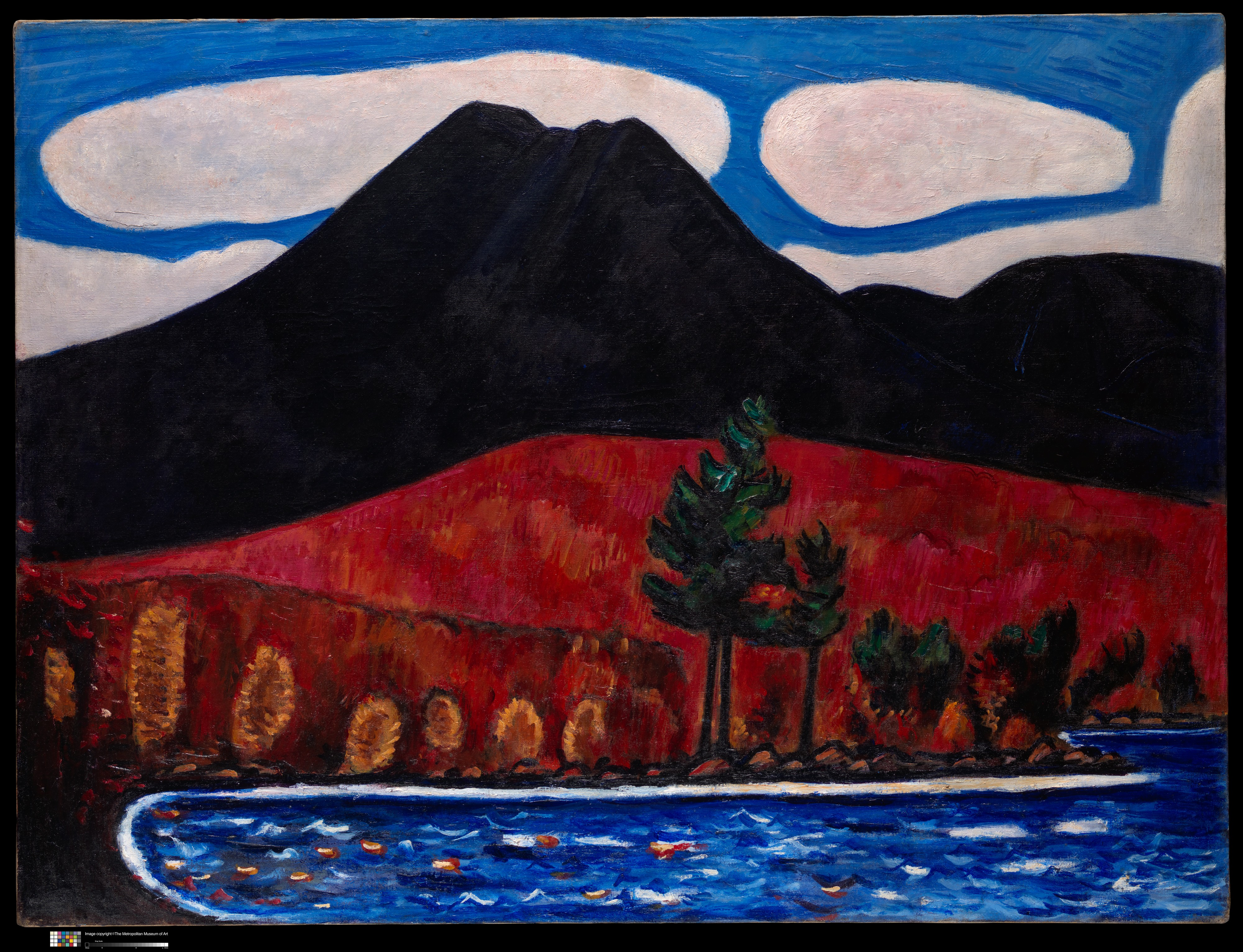
Mount Katahdin (Maine), Autumn No. 2, 1939–40, Metropolitan Museum of Art

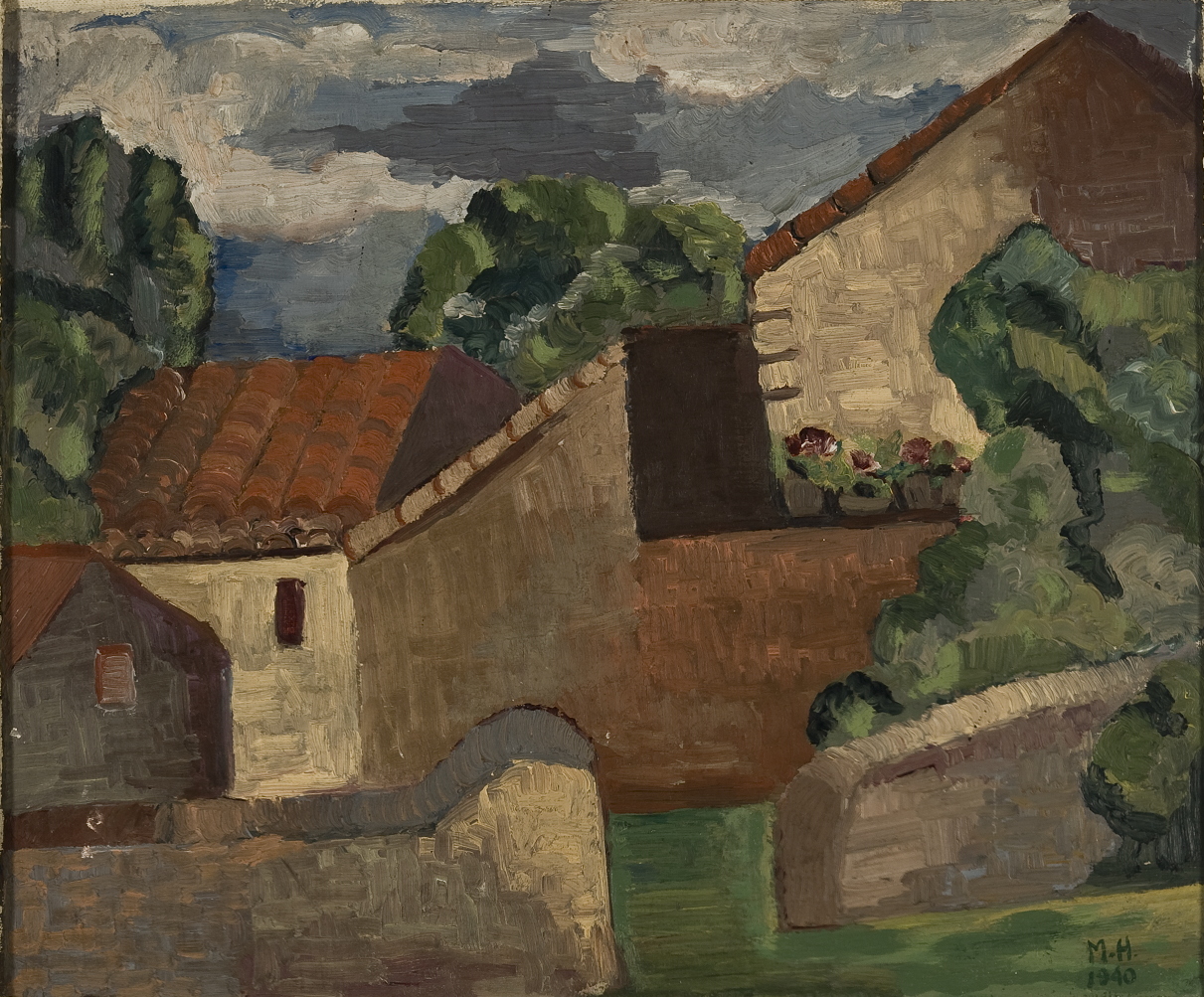
Village, 1940

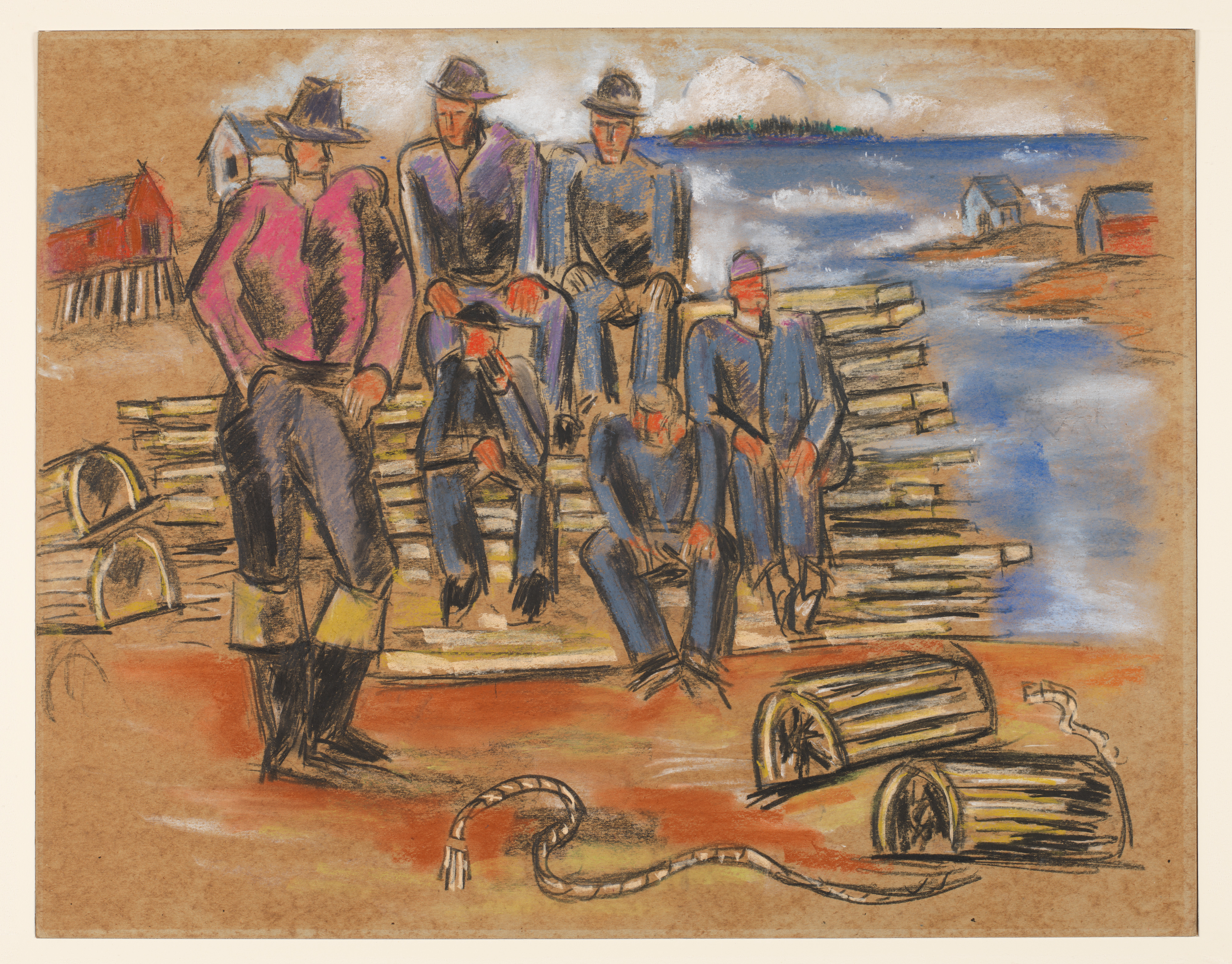
Study for "Lobster Fishermen", 1940, Metropolitan Museum of Art

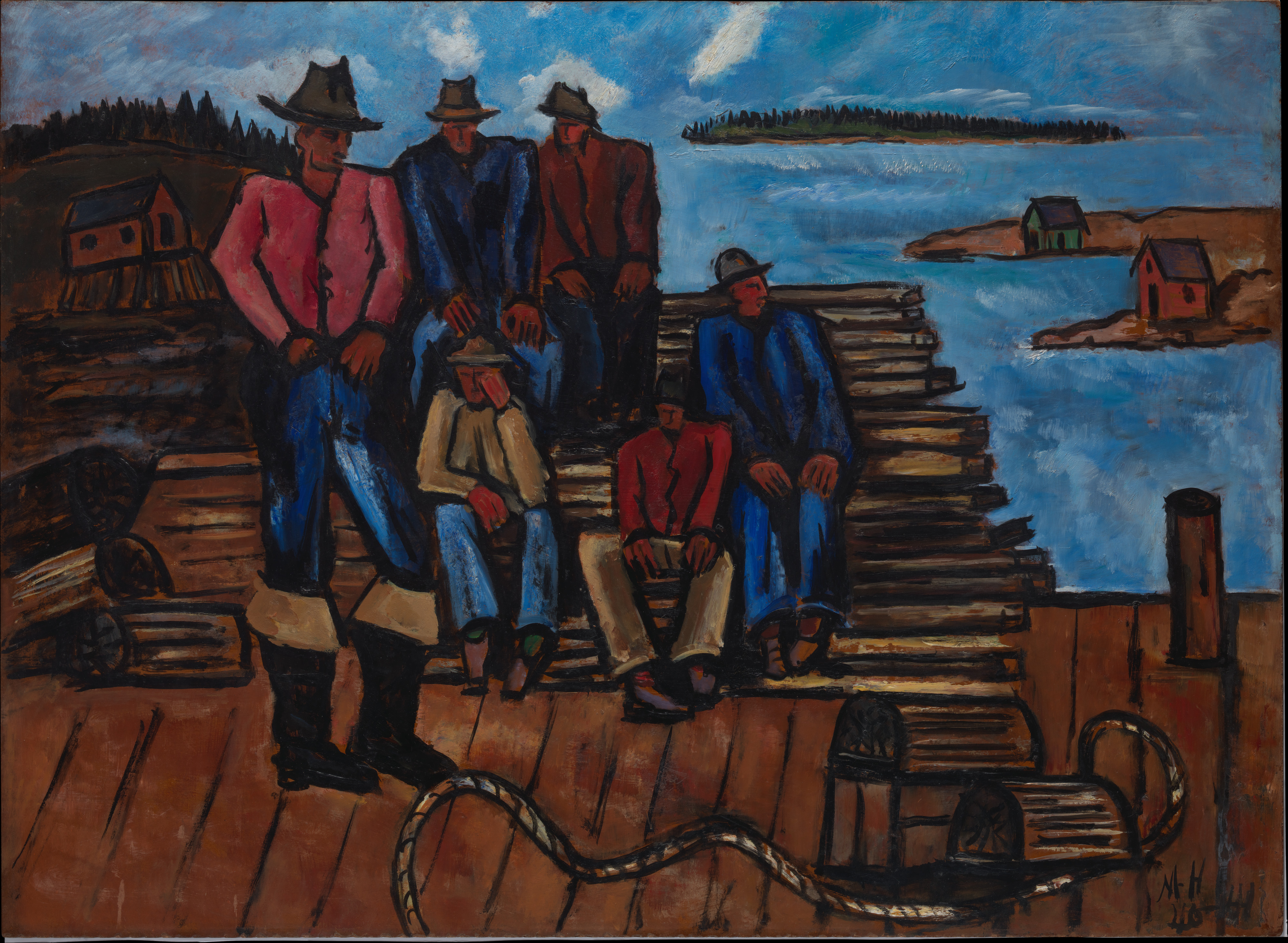
Lobster Fishermen, 1940–41, Metropolitan Museum of Art

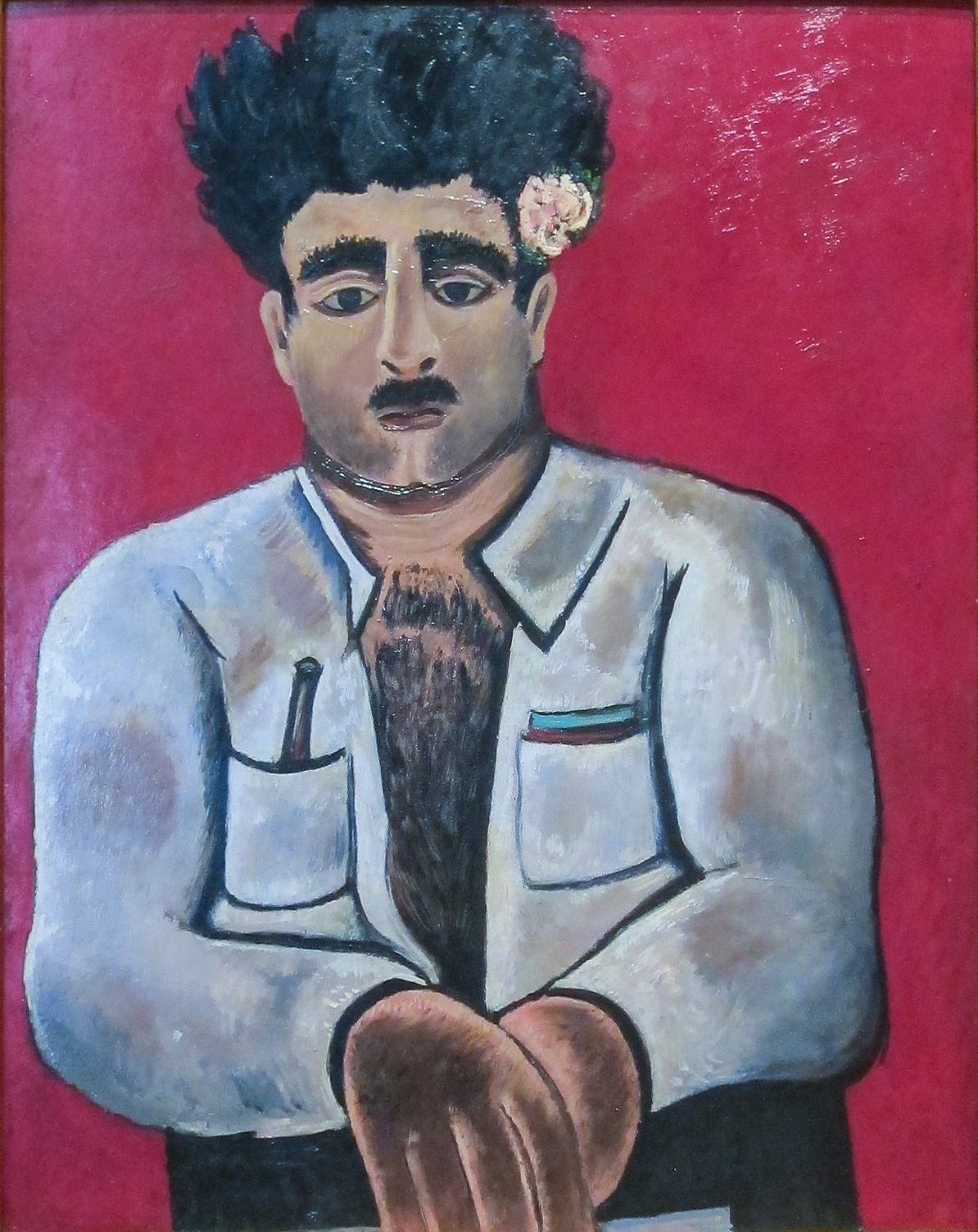
Adelard the Drowned, Master of the "Phantom", c. 1938–1939. Weisman Art Museum

== Writing ==
In addition to being considered one of the foremost American painters of the first half of the 20th century, Hartley also wrote poems, essays, and stories and published during his lifetime in many of the little magazines of the day, including one book of essays (Adventures in the Arts: Informal Chapters on Painters, Vaudeville and Poets. New York: Boni, Liveright, 1921; reprinted New York: Hacker Books, 1972) and three volumes of poetry (Twenty-five Poems, published by Robert McAlmon in Paris in 1923; Androscoggin, 1940; and Sea Burial, 1941). Posthumous collections of his writings include: Selected Poems. Edited by Henry W. Wells, New York: Viking Press, 1945; The Collected Poems of Marsden Hartley, 1904–1943. Edited and with an introduction by Gail R. Scott and a foreword by Robert Creeley. Santa Rosa, Calif.: Black Sparrow Press, 1987; On Art. Edited and with an introduction by Gail R. Scott. New York: Horizon Press, 1982; and his autobiography, Somehow a Past: The Autobiography of Marsden Hartley. Edited, with an introduction by Susan Elizabeth Ryan. Cambridge, Massachusetts and London: 1995.

Cleophas and His Own: A North Atlantic Tragedy is a story based on two periods he spent in 1935 and 1936 with the Mason family in the Lunenburg County, Nova Scotia, fishing community of East Point Island. Hartley, then in his late 50s, found there both an innocent, unrestrained love and the sense of family he had been seeking since his unhappy childhood in Maine. The impact of this experience lasted until his death in 1943 and helped widen the scope of his mature works, which included numerous portrayals of the Masons. He wrote of the Masons, "Five magnificent chapters out of an amazing, human book, these beautiful human beings, loving, tender, strong, courageous, dutiful, kind, so like the salt of the sea, the grit of the earth, the sheer face of the cliff." In Cleophas and His Own, written in Nova Scotia in the fall of 1936 and re-printed in Marsden Hartley and Nova Scotia, Hartley expresses his immense grief at the tragic drowning of the Mason sons. The independent filmmaker Michael Maglaras made a feature film, Cleophas and His Own, released in 2005, which uses a personal testament by Hartley as its screenplay.

== Scholarship ==
Since the artist's death in 1943, there have been several research projects to catalogue all of his paintings and drawings.

- An inventory begun by representatives of his Estate and carried out by the American Art Research Council under the auspices of the Whitney Museum of American Art was later enlarged upon by scholar and art critic Elizabeth McCausland (as yet unpublished).
- A catalogue raisonné project of Hartley's work was begun in the mid-1980s by art historian Gail Levin, distinguished professor at Baruch College and CUNY Graduate Center (as yet unpublished).
- In 2020, Bates College Museum of Art in Lewiston, Maine, partnered with leading Hartley scholar Gail R. Scott on The Marsden Hartley Legacy Project: The Complete Paintings and Works on Paper, which will be an online, publicly accessible, searchable collection of all known works by the artist.

== See also ==
- List of Maine Painters
- American Modern
- Transcendentalism
- Cubism
- Homosociality
- Charles Demuth
