= Ernie Toshack =

Australian cricketer (1914–2003)

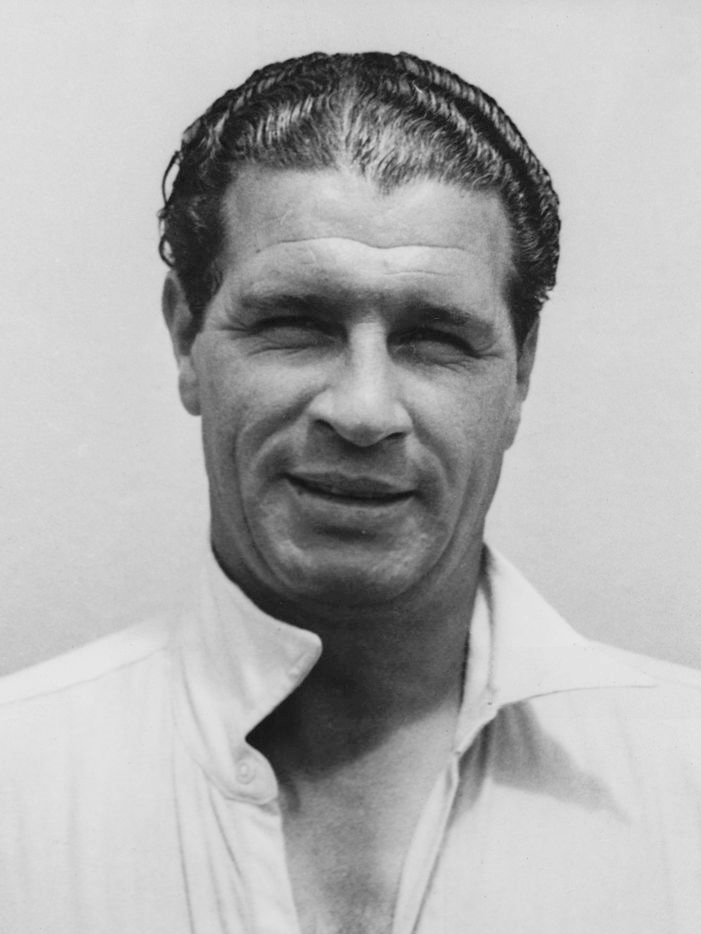
- Toshack c. 1947

Personal information
- Full name: Ernest Raymond Herbert Toshack
- Born: 8 December 1914; Cobar, New South Wales, Australia
- Died: 11 May 2003 (aged 88); Bobbin Head, New South Wales, Australia
- Nickname: The Black Prince
- Height: 187 cm (6 ft 2 in)
- Batting: Right-handed
- Bowling: Left-arm medium
- Role: Bowler

International information
- National side: Australia
- Test debut (cap 170): 29 March 1946 v New Zealand
- Last Test: 22 July 1948 v England

Domestic team information
- Years: Team
- 1945–1949: New South Wales

Career statistics
Competition	Test	FC
Matches	12	48
Runs scored	73	185
Batting average	14.59	5.78
100s/50s	0/0	0/0
Top score	20*	20*
Balls bowled	3,140	11,901
Wickets	47	195
Bowling average	21.04	20.37
5 wickets in innings	4	12
10 wickets in match	1	1
Best bowling	6/29	7/81
Catches/stumpings	4/0	10/0
- Source: ESPNcricinfo, 27 December 2007

Ernest Raymond Herbert Toshack (8 December 1914 – 11 May 2003) was an Australian cricketer who played in 12 Tests from 1946 to 1948. A left arm medium paced bowler known for his accuracy and stamina in the application of leg theory, Toshack was a member of Don Bradman's "Invincibles" that toured England in 1948 without being defeated. Toshack reinforced the Australian new ball attack of Ray Lindwall and Keith Miller.

Born in 1914, Toshack overcame many obstacles to reach international level cricket. He was orphaned as an infant, and his early cricket career was hindered because of financial difficulties caused by the Great Depression. The Second World War prevented Toshack from competing at first-class level until he was into his thirties. In 1945–46, the first season of cricket after the end of the War, Toshack made his debut at first-class level and after only seven matches in the Sheffield Shield he was selected for Australia's tour of New Zealand. In Wellington, he opened the bowling in a match that was retrospectively classed as an official Test match. Toshack became a regular member of the Australian team, playing in all of its Tests until the 1947–48 series against India. He took his career-best match bowling figures of 11 wickets for 31 runs (11/31) in the First Test but began to suffer recurring knee injuries, and a medical board had to approve his selection for the 1948 England tour. Toshack played in the first four Tests before being injured. After a long convalescence, he attempted a comeback during Australia's 1949–50 season, but further injury forced him to retire. He was a parsimonious bowler, who was popular with crowds for his sense of humour.

== Early years ==
Toshack was a descendant of John Randall, an 18th-century African-American convict to Australia. Born in the western New South Wales bush town of Cobar on 8 December 1914, Toshack was one of five children of a stationmaster. Orphaned at the age of six, he was raised by relatives in Lyndhurst in the central east of the state, and played his early cricket and rugby league for Cowra. At this time, Toshack's ambition was to play rugby league for Australia. One of his childhood friends, Edgar Newham, also played both sports and wanted to play Test cricket. However, the town's doctor, a local community leader, advised that they were targeting the wrong sport, and the two boys followed his recommendation. Newham later played rugby league for Australia.

In his youth he was also a boxer, and earned the nickname "Johnson" for his resemblance to American black heavyweight boxing champion Jack Johnson. In the mid-1930s, he made brief appearances for the State Colts and Second XI, and played cricket against the likes of the Test cricketer Stan McCabe. In December 1933, Toshack played in a colts match for New South Wales against Queensland. He took 3/63 (three wickets at a cost of 63 runs) and 3/36 but was unable to prevent a five-wicket defeat. He then took a total of 3/88 in a match for New South Wales Country against their city counterparts, and was promoted into the state's Second XI. Toshack took a total of 1/91 in a match against the Victorian Second XI and did not play for his state again until 1945.

His cricket aspirations, already hindered due to economic difficulties caused by the Great Depression, were further interrupted when he neede to use a wheelchair for months after a ruptured appendix in 1938. He was not allowed to enlist in the Australian Defence Force during World War II and worked at the Lithgow Small Arms Factory, in the town of Lithgow on the edge of the Blue Mountains west of Sydney. Only at the end of the war, aged 30, did he go to Sydney. At the time, he was a medium-fast left-arm bowler and approached the Petersham cricket club – as Toshack lived in the locality, it had the right to register him ahead of other clubs. Petersham did not select Toshack, so he joined Marrickville in Sydney Grade Cricket, starting in the third grade team in 1944–45. Within two matches, he rose to the first grade team. By this time, Petersham regretted its decision to spurn Toshack and lodged a complaint with the cricket authorities, claiming that he was obliged to represent Petersham and ineligible to play for Marrickville. Toshack later recalled that Petersham were "told where to go".

== First-class and Test debut ==
Upon the resumption of first-class cricket in 1945–46, Toshack made his debut for New South Wales against Queensland as an opening bowler aged almost 31, and was quickly among the wickets. He took four 4/69 in his first innings as his team took a 128-run lead, but he managed only 0/87 from 20 overs in the second innings as New South Wales fell to a four-wicket loss, failing to defend a target of 270. His first wicket was that of Geoff Cook. Toshack's most successful match of the season came in the following fixture, against South Australia. Taking 4/30 and 4/78 as New South Wales won by an innings. He then took 2/36 and 3/54 in an innings victory over the Australian Services.

By the end of the season, in March 1946, Toshack had taken 35 wickets in seven first-class matches, at an average of 18.82, making him the second highest wicket-taker behind George Tribe. He performed consistently and took at least four wickets in each match; his innings best was 4/30. Toshack was selected for a non-Test tour of New Zealand. He played in three provincial tour matches against Auckland, Canterbury and Wellington, all of which were won by an innings. He took match figures of 7/91 against Auckland and 8/58 against Wellington.

In the final match of the tour, Toshack opened the bowling for Australia with fellow debutant Ray Lindwall in a match against New Zealand at Wellington that was retrospectively recognised as a Test two years later. As it was eight years since Australia's last Test, a new post-war generation of international cricketers made their debut. Toshack was one of seven Australians playing their first Test. New Zealand were routed inside two days on a damp pitch, having been dismissed for 42 in their first innings after winning the toss and choosing to bat. Toshack's first Test wicket was that of opposing captain Walter Hadlee, who was caught by Keith Miller. Toshack took three further wickets to end with innings figures of 4/12. He did not bat as Australia made 8/198. New Zealand were then bowled out in their second innings for 54; Toshack took 2/6 as Australia recorded an innings victory. He dismissed Eric Tindill and Ces Burke in both innings. The performance ensured that Toshack would become an integral part of Australia's attack for the next three years. Toshack ended the tour with 23 wickets at 10.34 in four matches.

Toshack started the 1946–47 season strongly, taking 5/46 and 4/70 as New South Wales opened the season with a five-wicket win over Queensland. He removed Australian wicket-keeper Don Tallon twice. After going wicketless in a rain-curtailed match for his state against England, Toshack was selected to make his Ashes debut in the First Test at Brisbane. With the emergence of leading all rounder Keith Miller, Toshack was relegated to first change bowler as Miller began his much celebrated partnership with Lindwall. Toshack was unbeaten on one in his first innings with the bat when Australia were bowled out for 645 on the third day.

On a sticky wicket, Toshack initially struggled, bowling his characteristic leg stump line. England struggled to 117 runs for the loss of five wickets (5/117) at the end of the fourth day despite many interruptions caused by rain. Norman Yardley and captain Wally Hammond had defied the Australian bowlers since coming together at 5/66. On the fifth and final morning, captain Don Bradman advised him to pitch straighter and at a slower pace. Before play began Bradman took him down the pitch and showed him exactly where he wanted him to bowl and even make him bowl a practice over alongside to make sure he got it right. Having started the day wicketless, Toshack dismissed Yardley and Hammond in the space of 13 runs to break the English resistance and finished with an economical 3/17 from 17 overs as England were bowled out for 141. Bradman enforced the follow-on, and with Lindwall indisposed, Toshack took the new ball with Miller. He continued where he finished in the first innings, taking four of the first six wickets (Bill Edrich, Denis Compton, Hammond and Yardley) as the English top order were reduced to 6/65. He ended the innings with 6/82 as England were bowled out twice in a day to lose by an innings and 332 runs. The remaining four Tests were less successful: only in one innings did he take more than one wicket. In the Second Test at Sydney the pitch favoured spin bowling and Toshack only bowled 13 overs without taking a wicket as Australia claimed another innings victory. He took match figures of 2/127 on a flat pitch in the Third Test in Melbourne, removing Len Hutton and Compton. During the match, Toshack came in to bat in the second innings with Australia nine wickets down. He defended stubbornly and ended unbeaten on two as his partner Lindwall went from 81 to 100 to score the fastest Test century by an Australian, in 88 balls. Toshack was more productive in the drawn Fourth Test in Adelaide, where he took match figures of 5/135 from 66 eight ball overs in extreme heat, including the wicket of Hammond twice, Edrich and Joe Hardstaff junior. Ahead of the final Test, Toshack removed Compton, Edrich and Godfrey Evans in a drawn match for Victoria against the tourists. He took only one wicket in the Fifth Test as Australia sealed the series 3–0 with a five-wicket win. Toshack finished the series with 17 wickets at a bowling average of 25.71. His first-class season was not as productive as in his debut year; he took 33 wickets at an average of 30.93 in eleven matches, making him the sixth highest wicket-taker for the season. Toshack had a particularly unsuccessful time in the two Sheffield Shield matches against arch-rivals Victoria, which were lost by heavy margins of an innings and 114 runs, and 288 runs respectively. In the first match he took 0/133 after Australian teammate Miller hit three sixes from his opening over. In the second match he took a total of 3/144. Victoria went on to win the title.

The following 1947–48 season, Toshack warmed up for the Test campaign against the touring Indians by taking 2/64 and 4/65 for New South Wales in an innings win, dismissing Hemu Adhikari twice. He retained his position in the national team, and in the First Test at Brisbane on a wet pitch, Toshack took ten wickets for the only time in his Test career. In reply to Australia's 8/382 declared, India had been reduced to 5/23 by Lindwall, Miller and Bill Johnston before Vijay Hazare and captain Lala Amarnath took the score to 53 without further loss, prompting Toshack's introduction into the attack. He dismissed both and removed the remaining lower-order batsmen to end with 5/2 in 19 balls as India were bowled out after adding only five further runs. Bradman enforced the follow on and India reached 1/27 before a spell of 6/29 from Toshack reduced them to 8/89, including the wickets of Hazare, Amarnath and Khanderao Rangnekar for a second time. India were bowled out for 98 as Australia won by an innings and 226 runs. Injury persistently curtailed Toshack during the season, and he missed a month of cricket, including the next two Tests. He returned for the second match against arch-rivals Victoria, and took 6/38 and 2/71 to play a key role in a New South Wales victory by six wickets. His victims in the first innings included Test batsmen Lindsay Hassett, Neil Harvey and Sam Loxton as New South Wales took a decisive 290-run lead. He dismissed Hassett and Ken Meuleman in the second innings to help set up victory. Toshack only played in one further Test during the season, the Fourth, where he was less successful with match figures of 2/139. He dismissed centurion Dattu Phadkar as Australia went on to win the series 4–0. When fit, Toshack was a heavy wicket-taker; his 41 wickets at 20.26 placed him second only to Bill Johnston's 42 among Australian bowlers for the season.

== Invincibles tour ==
By the end of the Indian series, knee injuries had begun to hamper Toshack, and he only made the trip to England for the 1948 tour on a 3–2 majority vote by a medical team, despite being one of the first selected by the board. Two Melbourne doctors ruled him unfit, but three specialists from his home state presented a more optimistic outlook that allowed him to tour. The tour was to guarantee him immortality as a member of Bradman's "Invincibles". He grew tired of signing autographs during the voyage, and entrusted a friend with the task. As a result, there are still sheets circulating with his name mis-spelt as Toshak. Between the new-ball attacks of Lindwall, Keith Miller and Johnston every 55 overs, Toshack played the role of stifling England's scoring. In one match against Sussex, his 17 overs yielded only three scoring shots. He finished the match bowling 32 overs while conceding 29 runs. At Bramall Lane, Sheffield, he recorded the best innings analysis of his first-class career, taking 7/81 from 40 consecutive overs, bemusing the Yorkshire spectators with his accent and distinctive "Ow Wizz Ee" appealing. Bradman considered his 6/51 against the Marylebone Cricket Club at Lord's as the best performance of all. He removed the leading English batsmen Len Hutton and Denis Compton, as well as Martin Donnelly and Ken Cranston. In particular, Toshack was involved in an extended battle with Compton before dismissing him; Bradman said that their duel was "worth going a long way to see". This performance helped Australia to take an innings victory over a team that was virtually a full-strength England outfit and allowed Australia to take a psychological victory in a dress rehearsal ahead of the Tests.

Toshack's performance in the First Test at Trent Bridge was a quiet one, taking a wicket in each innings. He was involved in an aggressive final wicket partnership of 32 with Johnston, scoring 19 runs, his best at Test level to date in just 18 minutes. Toshack's best Test performance was his 5/40 in the second innings of the Second Test at Lord's when Miller was unable to bowl after being injured, including the wickets of Cyril Washbrook, Bill Edrich, captain Yardley and Alec Coxon. During this performance, he employed two short legs and a silly mid-off. He had a moderately successful Third Test, taking figures of 3/101 in the only Test that Australia did not win. His knee injury flared again in the Fourth Test after taking an ineffective 1/112 in the first innings, he was unable to bowl in the second innings of an Australian win. He made a recovery and it was hoped that he would be able to play in the Fifth Test, but he injured again himself in the lead-up match against Lancashire. He was taken to London for cartilage surgery, ending his tour and his Test career. An inept batsman with an average of 5.78 in first-class fixtures, Toshack managed a Test average of 51 on the 1948 tour after being out only once, behind only Arthur Morris, Sid Barnes, Bradman and Neil Harvey. The unbeaten 20 he managed in the Lord's Test was his best first-class score, made in an uninhibited tenth-wicket stand with Johnston. Due to the fragility of his knee, Toshack was used sparingly in the tour games, playing in only 11 of the 29 non-Test matches on the tour. Toshack totalled 50 wickets at the average of 21.12 for the tour.

The knee injury prevented Toshack from playing during the 1948–1949 Australian domestic season. The Australian team to tour South Africa in 1949–50 was named at the end of the previous season, and Toshack was omitted after a season on the sidelines. At the start of the 1949–50 season, when his Test teammates were sailing across the Indian Ocean to South Africa, Toshack made a strong start to his first-class comeback. He took 4/41 and 5/59 in a Shield match against Queensland in Brisbane, removing Ken Mackay and Wally Grout twice, helping to seal a close 15-run win. In the second match, against Western Australia, Toshack took 4/68 in the first innings before his injury resurfaced. New South Wales won the match despite Toshack's inability to bowl in the second innings. The injury cost Toshack dearly; it forced him to retire from first-class cricket and cost him a Test recall. Toshack had been offered a position on the South African tour as a reinforcement for Johnston, who had been involved in a car crash. Instead, Miller took the position and played in all five Tests.

== Style ==
Bowling primarily from over the wicket, his accuracy, changes of pace, and movement in both directions, coupled with a leg stump line to a packed leg-side field, made scoring off him difficult. He achieved his success in a manner not dissimilar to Derek Underwood a generation later. His accuracy and stamina allowed Ray Lindwall and Keith Miller, one of Australia's finest fast bowling pairs of all time, to draw breath between short and incisive bursts of pace and swing. Standing 6 feet 2 inches (188 cm), he was particularly effective on sticky wickets, reducing his speed to slow medium pace and using a repertoire of off cutters, inswingers, outswingers and leg breaks. Bowling a leg-stump line from over the wicket with a leg side cordon of two short legs and a silly mid-on, he was described by Bradman as "unique in every way". Bradman further added "I cannot remember another of the same type...He worried and got out the best bats, was amazingly accurate and must have turned in fine figures had not his cartilage given way." He usually bowled with four men on the off side including a slip, and five on the leg. When the pitch was wet, he moved a further man to the on side to field at leg slip.

Nicknamed the "Black Prince" because of his tanned skin, Toshack's looks and sense of humor made him a crowd favorite, as did his theatrical appealing, which was more reminiscent of later eras of cricketers. His vocal appealing prompted the journalist and former Australian Test batsman Jack Fingleton to dub him "The Voice", while teammate Sid Barnes called him "The film star" because of his looks. His sense of fun was often on show. While on the 1948 tour, he would often wear a bowler hat, grab a furled umbrella, and place a cigar in his mouth, parodying an Englishman.

== After cricket ==
Following his career, Toshack joined a firm of builders and spent 25 years as a foreman and supervisor on construction sites around Sydney. He also wrote about cricket and enjoyed cultivating his vegetable garden in the northern Sydney suburb of Hornsby Heights. Toshack died on 11 May 2003. He was survived by his wife Cathleen Hogan, whom he married in 1939, their only daughter, three granddaughters and two great-granddaughters.

== Test match performance ==
		Batting				Bowling			
Opposition	Matches	Runs	Average	High Score	100 / 50	Runs	Wickets	Average	Best (Inns)
England	9	65	16.25	20*	0/0	801	28	28.60	6/82
India	2	8	8.00	8	0/0	170	13	13.07	6/29
New Zealand	1	–	–	–	0/0	18	6	3.00	4/12
Overall	12	73	14.60	20*	0/0	989	47	21.04	6/29
