= Second Test, 1948 Ashes series =

Australia-England cricket test match

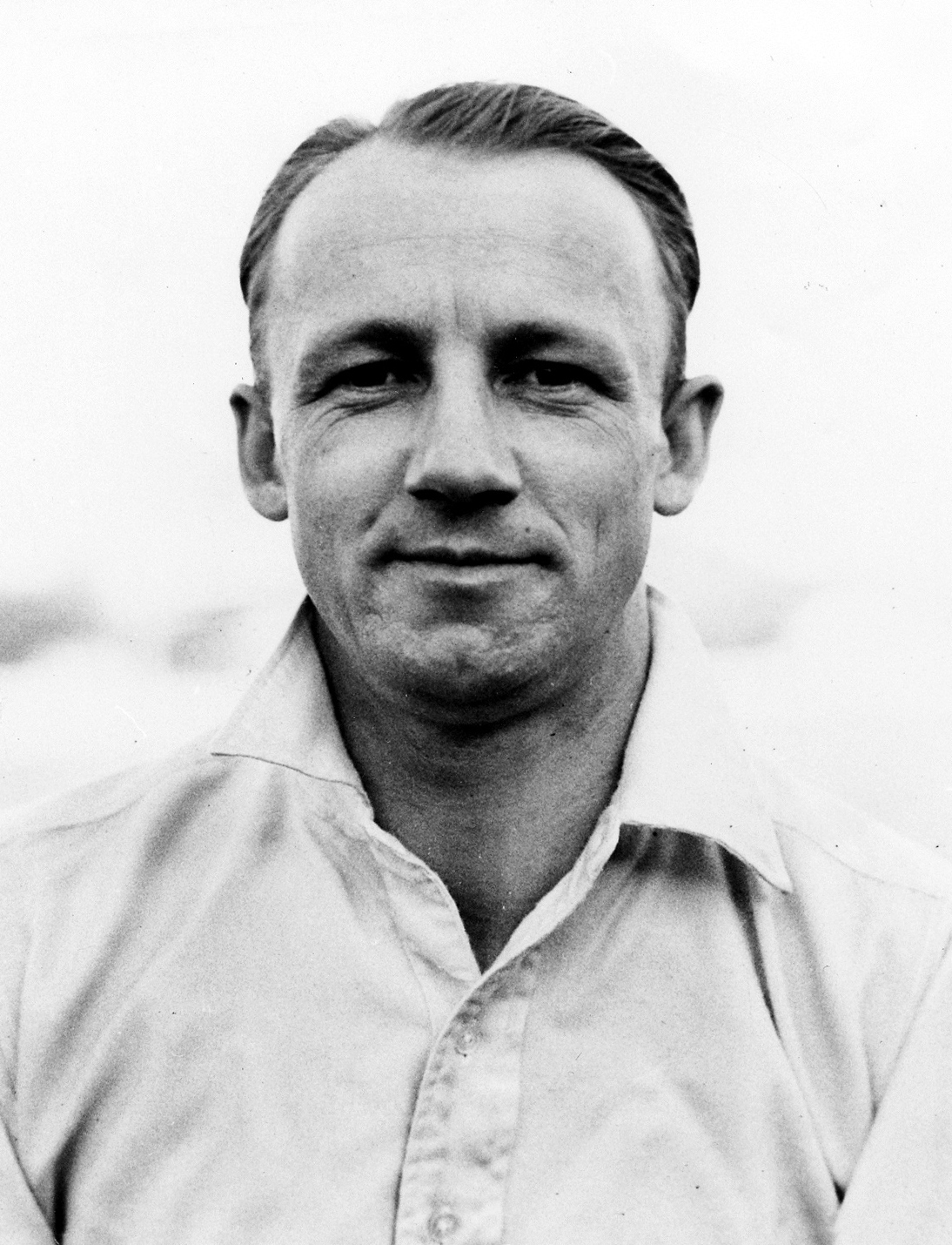
Don Bradman, who captained the victorious Australian team

The Second Test of the 1948 Ashes series was one of five Tests in The Ashes cricket series between Australia and England. The match was played at Lord's in London from 24 to 29 June, with a rest day on 27 June 1948. Australia won the match by 409 runs to take a 2–0 lead, meaning that England would need to win the remaining three matches to regain The Ashes.

Australian captain Don Bradman won the toss and chose to bat. The tourists had won the First Test convincingly, and decided to field the same team, while England made three changes, mainly to adopt a more attacking bowling strategy. Australia started strongly, led by opener Arthur Morris, who scored 105 and took the score to 166/2 mid-way through the first day. The later batsmen struggled after his departure and fell to 258/7 by the end of the first day, handing the home team the advantage. A lower-order counterattack on the second morning saw Australia reach 350, wicket-keeper Don Tallon scoring 53. For England, the seamer Alec Bedser was the most successful bowler, taking 4/100. Australian paceman Ray Lindwall then cut through the English top-order, reducing them to 46/4. After a recovery an 87-run partnership between Denis Compton—who top-scored with 53—and captain Norman Yardley, both fell within one run of each other and England looked set to be dismissed short of the follow on mark when they were at 145/7. However, the lower order resisted stoutly and they ended at 215 early on the third morning; Lindwall took 5/70. Australia then set about extending their first innings lead, and opener Sid Barnes led the way, scoring 141. He put on an opening partnership of 122 with Morris (62), and added 174 with Bradman (89). Australia closed the third day at 343/4 after a productive day of batting, giving them a lead of 478 despite losing three quick wickets late in the afternoon.

After the rest day, Australia reached 460/7—Keith Miller making 74—before Bradman declared, setting England a target of 596 midway through the afternoon. The hosts reached 106/3 at stumps on the fourth day, but collapsed on the final morning to be all out for 186, handing Australia a 409-run victory. Cyril Washbrook and Tom Dollery top-scored for England with 37 apiece. Ernie Toshack had the best figures with 5/40 while Lindwall took 3/61. Commentators credited Lindwall with orchestrating the England collapse; at the start of the innings he bowled at leading English batsmen Len Hutton at great pace before dismissing him. Hutton had appeared unsettled by Lindwall and played meekly. He was criticised for his timid manner and was controversially dropped for the following match as the selectors thought he was providing a poor example to the junior members of the team. The Australians were pleased with this decision, as they regarded Hutton as their most formidable opponent. The match set a new record for the highest attendance at a Test in England.

== Background ==
Australia had proceeded through the first two months of the tour of England without defeat. After winning 10 of the first twelve matches before the Tests started, eight of these by an innings—the other two were drawn—they won the First Test by eight wickets. Between the Tests, they defeated Northamptonshire by an innings before drawing against Yorkshire.

According to former English paceman Bill Bowes, England had approached the First Test with the intention of achieving a draw against a team they regarded as their superior, reflected in their selections and use of defensive tactics. Bowes himself believed the tactics to be correct and almost successful. However, he suspected that Walter Robins, one of the selectors, considered the English strategy to be misguided and that they should attack the Australians. This was reflected in the English selections. The home team made three changes; the leg spinner Doug Wright, who was forced to withdraw from the First Test at late notice due to lumbago, had regained his fitness and replaced the left arm orthodox spin of Young, who had taken match figures of 1/107 in the First Test—Australian wicket-keeper Don Tallon was his only wicket. However, he had managed to keep the batsmen quiet with his defensive leg theory, bowling 60 overs for 79 runs; Wright was a much more attacking and therefore expensive bowler. Jim Laker, who had been called into the First Test team due to Wright's lumbago, was initially the third spinner in the pecking order, but he took 4/138, including three specialist batsmen, and was retained.

Alec Coxon took match figures of 4/113 for Yorkshire against Australia, taking four middle-order wickets, and scored 21 and 16 not out in the middle-order. He came into the team as an all-rounder, even though his performances during the rest of the English season had been mediocre; he had a batting average of 20.25 for the summer and took only ten wickets in seven matches prior to the county fixture against Australia. Bowes saw him as an attacking bowler compatible with Robins's strategic thinking.

Tom Dollery was called into the team after a run of heavy scoring for Warwickshire on difficult pitches at Edgbaston. He had made two centuries and seven fifties in 12 first-class matches for the season. Batsman Charlie Barnett was dropped after scoring only eight and six in the First Test. Joe Hardstaff junior was also left out; he had scored a duck and 43 in the First Test, and had a toe infection, so the selectors were spared the predicament of deciding whether to drop him on performance grounds. With Wright in for Young, and Coxon selected in place of a specialist batsman, England had a more attacking bowling line-up, something the retired Australian Test leg spinner Bill O'Reilly praised. He also thought the selection of Coxon was beneficial, as his swing bowling would ease the workload of batsman Bill Edrich, who had opened the bowling in the previous Test. O'Reilly regarded Edrich as a mediocre bowler and thought the extra burden with the ball was detracting from his main duty, batting.

Australia retained the same XI from the First Test at Trent Bridge. Ian Johnson was retained despite taking match figures of 1/85, as was Bill Brown, the opener who was batting out of position in the middle-order. Brown had scored 25, 26 and 17 in his three innings in the middle-order during the tour. O'Reilly criticised the selection of Brown, who had appeared to be noticeably uncomfortable in the unfamiliar role. He said that despite Brown's unbeaten double century in his previous Test at Lord's in 1938, Sam Loxton and Neil Harvey had better claims to selection. Following his groin injury at Trent Bridge, Lindwall was subjected to a thorough fitness test on the first morning. Bradman was not convinced of Lindwall's fitness, but the bowler's protestations were sufficient to convince his captain to gamble on his inclusion. Australia won the toss and elected to bat, allowing Lindwall further time to recover from his injury. Before the toss, Bradman had spent an unusually long time inspecting the wicket, and after correctly predicting the side of the coin, he looked at the surface for another period before announcing Australia's decision to bat. The all-rounder Keith Miller played, but was unfit to bowl.

== Scorecard ==
Umpires	(England) D. Davies (England) C. N. Woolley
Toss	Australia elected to bat first
Result	Australia won by 409 runs
Series impact	Australia lead 5-match series 2–0

=== Australia innings ===
Australia	First innings		Second innings	
Batsman	Method of dismissal	Runs	Method of dismissal	Runs
S. G. Barnes	c Hutton b Coxon	0	c Washbrook b Yardley	141
A. R. Morris	c Hutton b Coxon	105	b Wright	62
* D. G. Bradman	c Hutton b Bedser	38	c Edrich b Bedser	89
A. L. Hassett	b Yardley	47	b Yardley	0
K. R. Miller	lbw b Bedser	4	c Bedser b Laker	74
W. A. Brown	lbw b Yardley	24	c Evans b Coxon	32
I. W. G. Johnson	c Evans b Edrich	4	[8] not out	9
+ D. Tallon	c Yardley b Bedser	53		
R. R. Lindwall	b Bedser	15	[7] st Evans b Laker	25
W. A. Johnston	st Evans b Wright	29		
E. R. H. Toshack	not out	20		
Extras		11		28
Total	(129.3 overs)	350	(130.2 overs)	460/7 declared

England	First innings				Second innings			
Bowler	Overs	Maidens	Runs	Wickets	Overs	Maidens	Runs	Wickets
A. V. Bedser	43	14	100	4	34	6	112	1
A. Coxon	35	10	90	2	28	3	82	1
W. J. Edrich	8	0	43	1	2	0	11	0
D. V. P. Wright	21.3	8	54	1	19	4	69	1
J. C. Laker	7	3	17	0	31.2	6	111	2
N. W. D. Yardley	15	4	35	2	13	4	36	2
D. C. S. Compton	–	–	–	–	3	0	11	0

=== England innings ===
England	First innings		Second innings	
Batsman	Method of dismissal	Runs	Method of dismissal	Runs
L. Hutton	b Johnson	20	c Johnson b Lindwall	13
C. Washbrook	c Tallon b Lindwall	8	c Tallon b Toshack	37
W. J. Edrich	b Lindwall	5	c Johnson b Toshack	2
D. C. S. Compton	c Miller b Johnston	53	c Miller b Johnston	29
H. E. Dollery	b Lindwall	0	b Lindwall	37
* N. W. D. Yardley	b Lindwall	44	b Toshack	11
A. Coxon	c & b Johnson	19	lbw b Toshack	0
+ T. G. Evans	c Miller b Johnston	9	not out	24
J. C. Laker	c Tallon b Johnson	28	b Lindwall	0
A. V. Bedser	b Lindwall	9	c Hassett b Johnston	9
D. V. P. Wright	not out	13	c Lindwall b Toshack	4
Extras		7		20
Total	(102.4 overs)	215	(78.1 overs)	186

Australia	First innings				Second innings			
Bowler	Overs	Maidens	Runs	Wickets	Overs	Maidens	Runs	Wickets
R. R. Lindwall	27.4	7	70	5	23	9	61	3
W. A. Johnston	22	4	43	2	33	15	62	2
I. W. G. Johnson	35	13	72	3	2	1	3	0
E. R. H. Toshack	18	11	23	0	20.1	6	40	5

== 24 June: Day One ==
At 8:00 on the morning of the Test, there was a storm to the south of London but the rain did not reach Lord's, which was located in the north of the English capital. The first over bowled by Bedser to Barnes was watchfully played to complete a maiden. The debutant Coxon opened the bowling with Bedser and he removed Barnes for a duck in his second over, caught by Hutton at short fine leg from a short delivery to leave Australia 3/1. Barnes tried to knock the ball through square leg but misjudged the pace of the wicket and played his shot too early, mishitting the ball to Hutton. Coxon bowled from very close to the wickets and left substantial footmarks just outside the right-hander's leg stump in an area ideal for a leg spinner. Although he was not of particularly fast pace, Coxon ran in vigorously and landed heavily after a pronounced delivery stride, making a significant impact on the surface. Bradman received a loud, positive reception from the crowd as he came out to bat in his final Test at Lord's.

Bradman initially struggled against the English bowling. He faced his first ball from Coxon and inside edged it past his leg stump, before missing the third ball from Coxon and surviving a loud appeal for leg before wicket (lbw). Bowling from the other end, Bedser beat Bradman with seam movement off the pitch and one ball narrowly skimmed past the stumps. Standing up to the stumps, wicket-keeper Godfrey Evans removed the bails as Bradman leaned forward, but his foot had stayed firmly behind the crease. In another close call, Bradman inside edged a ball towards Yardley at short leg, but the English captain was slow to react and the ball landed in front of him. The Australian captain managed only three runs in the first 20 minutes and Australia had scored only 14 after the first 30 minutes. Coxon consistently moved the ball into a cautious Bradman, and the Australians scored only 32 runs in the first hour.

Edrich then relieved Coxon, who had bowled his first seven overs in Test cricket for the loss of only 10 runs. Edrich bowled a bouncer, which Bradman tried to swing to the leg side, but the leading edge instead went in the air and landed behind point. On 13, Bradman leg glanced a Bedser ball from his legs, narrowly evading Hutton in the trap at short fine leg. After one hour, he was on 14. Bradman had fallen twice for the leg trap in the previous Test. Bedser continued to the probe the Australian captain with inswingers, trying to extract a lofted leg glance in the vicinity if the waiting Hutton. In contrast, Morris was playing fluently and scoring many runs from the back cut.

Bedser was relieved after 70 minutes of bowling. The leg spin of Wright was introduced and Australia cut loose. Wright bowled a no-ball that Morris dispatched into the leg side crowd for six, before hitting another ball for four. Bradman and Morris settled down as Coxon and Wright operated. The Australian captain drove the debutant Coxon through the covers for two fours, and Yardley made frequent rotations of his bowlers. Coxon continued to significantly rough up the pitch outside the right-handed batsman's leg stump, and from the other, Wright was able to extract substantial spin on the first morning of the match, hitting Morris in the stomach with a ball that turned in sharply from outside off stump. At lunch, Australia were 82/1 with Morris on 45 and Bradman 35. The tourists had largely been content to wait for loose deliveries, rather than take risks, and as the Englishmen bowled accurately, the Australians did not score quickly.

In the third over after the lunch break, with the score at 87, Bradman was caught for the third consecutive time in the series by Hutton off Bedser at short fine leg. Hutton had dropped Bradman in the same position when he was on 13. Including a county match against Yorkshire, it was the fourth time Hutton had caught Bradman in the leg trap from a glance. According to O'Reilly, this was evidence that Bradman was no longer the player he was before World War II, as he had been unable to disperse the close-catching fielders by counter-attacking, before eventually being dismissed. O'Reilly said this was the first time Bradman had fallen to the same trap three times in succession.

Hassett came to the crease to join Morris, with the new ball already due. Still using the old ball, Bedser beat Hassett second ball with a delivery that moved back in, but the appeal for lbw was turned down. However, Yardley opted to not take the ball, and Hassett managed to score a single and get off strike before the English captain called for a replacement ball. O'Reilly said the failure to take the new ball immediately after the appeal was a missed opportunity to maximise the psychological pressure on Hassett.

After a slow start, Morris had begun to take control. He drove the ball through the covers and clipped it through the leg side, and reached his century with consecutive boundaries from Coxon soon after the new ball was taken. Former Australian Test opener Jack Fingleton, covering the tour as a newspaper journalist, called it "a pretty Test century in the grandest of all cricket settings". The century ended a poor run of form for Morris earlier in the tour, when he had been shuffling uncertainly on the crease without decisively moving forward or back. O'Reilly called it Morris's best Test century to date, as this was the strongest English attack he had faced during his career, and because of the loss of wickets at the other end. O'Reilly said Morris had been disciplined in not playing loose shots outside off stump and missing or edging them, yet still being able to score quickly at every opportunity.

Morris was out soon after for 105 runs with the score at 166/3, having struck 14 fours and one six. His innings, which was noted for powerful, well-placed cover drives, ended when he hit Coxon to Hutton in the gully. Miller came in and Bedser bowled three consecutive outswingers to him. A fourth ball swung the other way, and Miller did not offer a shot, expecting the ball to curve away and miss the stumps. Instead, he was hit in front of the wickets and given out lbw for four. O'Reilly said Miller's display was more akin to that of a tail-end batsman with minimal skill, and blamed his poor form with the bat on an excessive workload imposed on him by Bradman. With two quick wickets, England had put the match back in the balance. Batting out of position in the middle-order, Brown came in at 173/4 and helped Hassett to rebuild the innings. Both scored slowly, averaging more than three and a half minutes for each run. They realised Australia could not afford to lose any more wickets quickly and batted with extreme caution, reluctant even to attack long hops. Hassett was dropped three times before Yardley, who was bowling mainly in order to allow his frontline bowlers to recuperate, broke through his defences with a yorker. The English skipper trapped Brown lbw nine runs later to leave Australia at 225/6. Brown had hit two consecutive half-volleys off his pads through the leg side for four, and attempted a third boundary in a row to a similar delivery. However, this third delivery came off the pitch more quickly and beat Brown for pace.

This left Johnson and Tallon as the new men at the crease. Johnson struggled to score, while Tallon did so freely in the last hour. Edrich had Johnson caught behind for four to leave Australia at 246/7. Johnson had contributed only four of the 30 runs scored while he was at the crease. Lindwall joined Tallon and the pair survived to the close of play. England were well placed when Australia ended at stumps on 258/7 with Tallon on 25 and Lindwall on 3. Tallon had dominated the scoring late in the day, making 25 of the 33 runs added. Bowes believed that Yardley attacked very well, keeping the pressure on Australia by rotating his bowlers effectively so his three main bowlers were always at the crease. O'Reilly praised Evans's agile display in his stumping attempts as the fastest and best he had seen. The English crowd were optimistic about England's position and some of them immediately camped outside the turnstiles upon leaving the ground. Arlott said England's "bowlers had done nobly".

== 25 June: Day Two ==
The next day, the English crowd filled the ground early, anticipating a strong showing from the home team after their promising start on the first day, but Australia's lower order batted their team into control on the second morning. Tallon and Lindwall batted confidently from the start of the play, and the latter hit two cover drives for four from Bedser after the new ball was taken. O'Reilly said Lindwall was playing in the same manner as when he made his maiden Test century in the last Ashes series, but he then played around a straight ball from Bedser, and was bowled for 15 to leave the score at 275/8. Tallon kept on batting in a conventional manner, while Johnston and Toshack played adventurously, registering the highest Test scores of their careers. Both Johnston and Toshack swung hard at the ball, which often went in vastly different directions to where they had aimed their shots. Australia's wicket-keeper put on 45 with Johnston—who scored 29—before becoming Bedser's second victim of the morning, holing out to Yardley for 53. Toshack came out to join Johnston with the score at 320/9 and the last pair put on 30 more runs before the latter was stumped from Wright's leg spin, having overbalanced while leaning onto the front foot and trying to hit a ball for six. The Australians had regained the momentum, adding 92 runs in 66 minutes of hitting in the morning. One sequence of two overs from Edrich was taken for 28 runs, with many balls being unintentionally spooned over the slips or the covers from mishits. Both Johnston and Toshack—not known for their batting ability—played without inhibitions, joyfully revelling in their luck. Yardley was later criticised for not bringing Wright into the attack at an earlier stage, as the Australian tail was dealing efficiently with the English pacemen. Bedser was the most successful of the bowlers, ending with 4/100 from 43 overs, while debutant Coxon took 2/90 from 35 overs. The off spin of Laker was used sparingly, accounting for only seven overs, whereas the part-time medium pace of Edrich and Yardley had combined for 23 overs.

Washbrook and Hutton then strode to the crease as England faced a short burst of Australian pace before the lunch break. Lindwall took the new ball and felt pain in his groin after delivering the first ball to Hutton. Despite this, Lindwall persevered, and his first over was a maiden. Seeing Lindwall struggle through the pain barrier, Bradman tossed the ball to Miller at the start off the second over to see if he could lift and bowl as well. However, Miller threw the ball back to his captain, indicating that his body would not be able to withstand the strain. This resulted in media speculation that Bradman and Miller had quarrelled.

Although Bradman claimed the exchange had been amicable, others disputed this. Teammate Barnes later asserted that Miller had retorted by suggesting Bradman—a very occasional slower bowler—bowl himself. Barnes said the captain "was as wild as a battery-stung brumby" and warned his unwilling bowler that there would be consequences for his defiance. According to unpublished writings in Fingleton's personal collection, Bradman chastised his players in the dressing room at the end of the play, saying "I'm 40 and I can do my full day's work in the field." Miller reportedly snapped "So would I—if I had fibrositis"; Bradman had been discharged from the armed services during World War II on health grounds, whereas most of the team had been sent into battle. Miller had crash-landed while serving as a fighter pilot in the Royal Australian Air Force in England and had suffered chronic back trouble ever since.

Washbrook had been criticised after the First Test for playing aggressively and taking too many risks early in his innings, having fallen twice to attacking shots. He continued to play in a similar way, rather than adopting the traditional opener's strategy of not playing at any ball unless it was going to hit the stumps and waiting for the bowlers to tire. Lindwall had Washbrook caught behind for eight in his fourth over, playing at a ball outside off stump, and ended his pre-lunch spell with 1/7 from six overs, while Johnston accompanied him from the other end. Neither Hutton nor Washbrook appeared comfortable against the bowling, and the new batsman Edrich tried to hit Lindwall through the off side, leading to a loud appeal for caught behind, which was turned down. After lunch, Hutton did the majority of the scoring, before playing outside a Johnson off break on the front foot and being bowled for 20 to leave England at 32/2. The English opener had been uncertain against Johnson's spin and played forward too early at a slower ball, which went between a gap between his bat and pad. Compton came in, having been dismissed hit wicket after falling over in the last Test while trying to avoid a bouncer, and Lindwall delivered a few short balls straight away, but the new batsman was not caught off-guard. Lindwall then clean bowled Edrich—who was playing across the line—with an outswinger for five. Edrich had toiled for 70 minutes in scoring those runs. Dollery came out and played the first ball with his pads before being bowled for a duck from the next delivery. Dollery's bat was still about to start its downward swing towards by the time Lindwall's outswinger had passed him and hit the stumps. O'Reilly said Dollery's inability to deal with Lindwall was typical of English cricket's lack of answers to express pace bowling. This was part of a six-over post-lunch spell by Lindwall that yielded 2/11 as the batsmen appeared unable to deal with his extreme pace. England were 46/4 and Australia firmly in control.

Compton was joined by his skipper Yardley and after playing defensively for a period, the pair rebuilt the innings, scoring 87 runs in 100 minutes. After the loss of four quick wickets, the Compton and Yardley elected to not play at any balls that were not on the line of the stumps, and Lindwall and Johnston were taken off to recuperate ahead of the second new ball. Australia had the option of taking the new ball just before the tea break, but Bradman decided to wait so his two pacemen could have an extra 20 minutes to replenish their energy levels. Meanwhile, Johnson and Toshack operated, and the English duo played them cautiously and comfortably. At tea, England had recovered to be 129/4, with Compton on 51 and Yardley 42. The English captain had been particularly successful against Johnson, capitalising on a series of overpitched balls and driving them away for runs. After tea, Lindwall and Johnston returned with the new ball, but the former appeared to be tired and lacking in spirit in his first over. Compton edged Johnston into the slips, where Miller took a low catch, ending his innings for 53. One run later, Lindwall clipped Yardley's off stump with the first ball of the next over to leave England at 134/6; the home skipper had made 44 before an outswinger had evaded his bat as he attempted to play a back foot defensive shot. Evans came to the crease and tried to counter-attack, hitting Lindwall for a boundary past square leg. Johnston then removed Evans for nine, caught by a diving Miller from a swing of the bat wide outside off stump, leaving the hosts at 145/7.

Coxon and Laker came to the crease and put on a 41-run stand for the eighth wicket. After 85 minutes of resistance, Coxon hit a catch back to Johnson, ending his first Test innings for 19, and Laker was caught behind from the same bowler, having already been dropped twice in the slips. England's last pair added ten runs to close at stumps on 207/9 with Bedser on six and Wright eight, having just avoided the follow on.

== 26 June: Day Three ==
On the third morning, Bedser and Wright survived for 20 minutes, and Lindwall tried to break their resistance by aiming a few bouncers at the former. Bedser eventually inside edged a Lindwall bouncer onto his stumps, ending England's innings at 215, giving Australia a 135-run first innings lead. Lindwall ended with 5/70, while Johnson took 3/72 and Johnston 2/43. Toshack was the other bowler used, sending down 18 overs for the loss of 23 runs. In later years, Bradman told Lindwall that he pretended not to notice his bowler's pain. Lindwall was worried his captain had noticed the injury, but Bradman later claimed to have feigned ignorance to allow his paceman to relax. O'Reilly said Lindwall "bowled as well as any fast bowler can bowl. He always seemed to have the situation sized up correctly and he knew just when to put his all into the task ... and enjoyed a triumph which seldom comes to any bowler." Arlott praised Lindwall for his subtle variations in pace, line and length, and how he kept the batsman guessing as to what was coming to them.

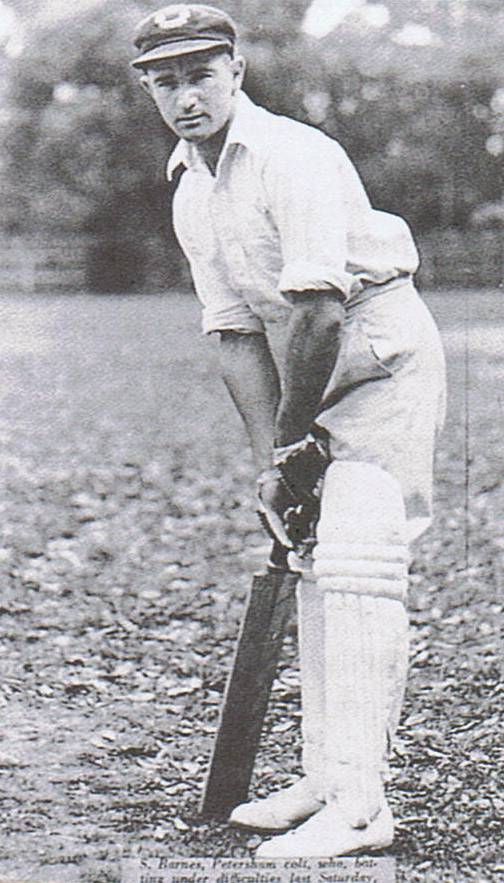
Barnes, pictured here in a photo at the age of 16, top-scored with 141 in the second innings.

The weather was fine as Australia started their second innings just after noon. From the second ball of the innings, bowled by Bedser, Barnes got off the mark to avoid his pair. Coxon took the new ball at the other end and Barnes and Morris saw it off. In contrast to their English counterparts, the Australian opening pair took a cautious approach to begin with, avoiding the hook shot and not playing at balls that were not going to hit the stumps and established a solid start for themselves. Yardley then introduced Laker, who induced Morris to hit a ball back down the pitch in the air, but the bowler was slow to react to the possibility of a caught and bowled. According to O'Reilly, most other bowlers would have been able to reach the ball and attempt a catch. Barnes survived a missed stumping opportunity from Laker in the same over when he was on 18; he came down the pitch and the ball bounced out of the footmarks and narrowly missed leg stump, but Evans fumbled it, and it went away for four byes.

Barnes took advantage of his reprieve to combine with Morris in an opening stand of 122, as Yardley made frequent bowling changes in an attempt to disrupt their progress. Wright came on and bowled a no-ball, which Morris lofted into the crowd for six. Morris stopped shuffling, while Barnes decided to adopt a strategy of pre-emptively moving down the pitch to Laker. Earlier in the tour, Barnes had often been bowled or trapped lbw trying to force off breaks into the leg side. He drove Laker into the pavilion and Australia were 73/0 at lunch with Morris on 40 and Barnes 25, an overall lead of 208.

After lunch, Morris was bowled for 62, knocking a ball from Wright onto his stumps, after attempting a sweep from a long hop. This brought Bradman in to join Barnes. Yardley surrounded the Australian captain with fielders and Laker beat his bat thrice in an over. Bedser was brought in with the leg trap again in place as he bowled on Bradman's pads with the second new ball. The Australian captain decided to avoid the danger of being caught at short fine leg from a leg glance by padding the inswingers away with his front leg. Bedser responded by changing his tactics by bowling a series of outswingers, beating the outside edge of his bat three times in a row, narrowly missing the off stump on one occasion. Barnes responded by manipulating the strike and shielding Bradman from Bedser. The Australian opener had little trouble against the leg trap Bedser set for him, scoring freely into the leg side and taking the shine off the new ball.

Barnes was also quiet after lunch, and after one long period of defence, he drove Laker for four through the covers, eliciting a round of ironic applause. The Australian opener responded by placing his hand on his chest and bowing to the spectators. Barnes had started slowly, but he accelerated after reaching his half-century. Bradman took two consecutive boundaries from Wright to bring up his fifty. This left Barnes on 96 and Australia at 222/1, half an hour after tea. By this time, the pace of the pitch appeared to have slowed, making batting relatively easy.

Barnes lingered for a further ten minutes on 96 before reaching his century with a straight drive from Laker. He had taken 255 minutes and hit ten fours. After registering his century, Barnes became particularly aggressive. Barnes stepped out to attack Laker but missed; luckily for him, Evans failed to collect the ball as it turned down the leg side.

Barnes dispatched one Laker over for 21 runs, including two successive blows over the long on boundary for six, and two fours, and Australia's lead went past the 400 mark with nine wickets still in hand. Yardley then brought on the part-time left-arm unorthodox spin of Compton, and himself, in an attempt to stem Barnes' hitting. The Australian finally fell for 141, caught by Washbrook on the boundary from Yardley. The ball would have gone for another six had it not been intercepted by Washbrook. Barnes had struck 14 boundaries and two sixes in his innings. The speed of his batting had allowed Australia to reach 296/2 in minutes, after a 174-run partnership with Bradman. Yardley bowled Hassett for a golden duck off the inside edge, so Miller came to the crease at 296/3 to face Yardley's hat-trick ball. The Australian all-rounder survived a loud lbw appeal on his first ball, denying the English captain his hat-trick. Despite Yardley's failure to complete the hat-trick, he had taken four wickets in the match, and was going through an unusually productive period with his semi-regular bowling. While England's front-line bowlers struggled, Yardley managed 9 wickets at a bowling average of 22.66 for the series. His average was second only to Lindwall among all bowlers, and only Bedser (18) among his players dismissed more batsmen. In contrast, Yardley averaged less than two wickets every three matches throughout his first-class career, at an average above 30.

Bradman was on 89 and heading towards a century in his last Test innings at Lord's when he fell to Bedser again, this time courtesy of a one-handed diving effort from Edrich. Bradman had been worried by Bedser's angle into his pads and the leg trap, but the seamer's leg cutter moved the ball the other way towards the slips and caught Bradman's outside edge. Bedser had dismissed Bradman all four times so far in the Test series. Brown joined Miller at 329/4 after Australia had lost 3/33. The tourists reached stumps at 343 without further loss, Miller striking one six over square leg into the grandstand. He had also offered two chances, but none of the catches were completed. This gave Australia a lead of 478 at the end of the third day, with Miller on 22 and Brown on 7. In all, England had missed seven catches or stumpings. O'Reilly said the loss of three quick wickets in the afternoon was not so much a sign of an English revival but Australian complacency due to the large size of the lead.

== 28 June: Day Four ==
After the Sunday rest day, Australia resumed with a lead of 478 runs and six wickets in hand. The morning was punctuated by three rain stoppages, which increased England's chances of saving the game. Just ten minutes after the start of the day's play, heavy rain intervened. The weather cleared and Miller and Brown moved to lunch on 63 and 32 respectively, having advanced Australia to 409/4. Miller was given a life before lunch when he hit a ball high into the air; Dollery stood right under it and had ample time to prepare, but dropped the catch. In 88 minutes of play, Australia added a further 66 runs. During this time, the third new ball became available, but England opted not to use it immediately, as the wet and slippery ground had made it hard for the bowlers to grip the ball or run up to the crease with confidence; the hosts instead waited for drier conditions so they could exercise more control over the ball. However, after a period of using his slower bowlers, Yardley opted to take the new ball, and Miller hit three boundaries to pass 50, and both batsmen lifted their rate of scoring. It appeared that aside from the need to score quickly in preparation for the declaration, both players found the new ball easier to see than its muddied predecessor. Miller hooked Coxon repeatedly, and drove Bedser for many runs. Bradman was expected to declare just before lunch so he could attack the English openers for a short period before the adjournment, but a shower at this time deterred him from doing so, as his bowlers would have struggled to grip the ball; Lindwall had also been injured on a slippery surface in earlier times.

After the resumption of play, Brown was caught behind from Coxon for 32 without adding to his lunch score, ending an 87-run partnership with Miller, and bringing Lindwall to the crease at 416/5. Miller and Lindwall attacked at every opportunity before the declaration. Miller's innings was noted for its driving, and he was out for 74, playing a hook shot that was caught by Bedser at square leg from Laker in pursuit of quick runs. He was followed by Lindwall, who ran out of his crease in attempt to hit Laker across the line to the boundary, missed, and was stumped for 25, prompting Bradman to declare with Australia at 460/7 with a lead of 595 runs. The tourists had added 51 runs for the loss of three wickets in approximately an hour's batting after lunch. Yardley and Laker had been the only multiple wicket-takers, with two each. The Australians had punished the spinners the most, taking more than 3.50 runs per over from each of Wright, Laker and Compton. It would take a world record chase from England to win the match.

Yardley decided to use the medium roller to flatten out the surface, but further showers breathed more life into the pitch, forcing a rain break immediately after the start of England's run chase. The rain immediately stopped after the players returned to the pavilion, but upon promptly returning to the middle, the rain started again. The players returned after 15 minutes and played for approximately half an hour, before Washbrook and Hutton unsuccessfully appealed against the light. Rain then came again for another 40 minutes, which included the tea break. The weather cleared in time for the normal resumption of play at 4:30 after the scheduled adjournment.

When the players returned, Lindwall and Johnston extracted steep bounce with the new ball, troubling the English batsmen. However, Washbrook changed his tactics and decided to eschew the hook shot, even allowing some short balls to hit him on the body. Washbrook drove Johnston for three runs and then pulled Lindwall for a four, almost collecting Barnes—who was standing close in at short leg—in the nose. He proceeded to score England's first 16 runs. Lindwall dropped Hutton from Johnston's bowling before the English batsman had scored. Johnston usually moved the ball into the right-handed batsmen, but on this occasion the ball went straight on and took the outside of the edge of the bat. Hutton had trouble dealing with Lindwall, and played and missed multiple times in the deteriorating light, hampered by the lack of a sightscreen. Fingleton described it as "probably Hutton's worst effort in a Test". In a fidgety display, Hutton played loosely outside the off stump and missed four times in one Johnston over. O'Reilly said Hutton "seemed to have lost all power of concentration and looked like a man being led to the gallows", and that he "was little more than a masquerader compared to the Hutton [of 1938]". Hutton took 32 minutes of batting to score his first run of the innings.

Hutton and Washbrook took the score to 42, England's highest opening partnership of the series thus far, before the former edged Lindwall to Johnson in the slips and was out for 13. Edrich and Washbrook were then subjected to repeated short balls, and the latter was hit several times on the fingers while fending down Lindwall's bouncers, having decided to avoid the hook shot. Edrich ducked so low and so quickly that the top of the stumps could often be seen behind his back. Soon after, Toshack removed both Edrich and Washbrook in quick succession to leave England at 65/3. Edrich, having played only one scoring shot in the preceding 20 minutes, edged an overpitched delivery to Johnson low down in the slips, and decided to stand his ground after the catch was taken. The batsman thought he may have hit a bump ball into the ground before it flew to Johnson, but the umpire ruled otherwise and gave him out. Tallon then took a difficult catch to remove Washbrook. Washbrook inside edged a Toshack full toss directly downwards at Tallon's ankle. Bradman described the catch as "miraculous" because Tallon had to reach so low, so quickly, in order to take the catch. Up until this point, Washbrook had been beginning to find some fluency and was striking the ball confidently. Arlott speculated that Edrich and Washbrook may have lost concentration after Lindwall was replaced by Toshack, lulled into a false sense of security once Australia's leading bowler was no longer operating. However, Compton and Dollery added 41 in the last 30 minutes to take England to 106/3 at the close of play. Compton was on 29 and Dollery 21. The latter was particularly fluent in scoring on the leg side and he defied the Australian bowlers resolutely. Lindwall was brought back to put pressure on Dollery, having bowled him for a duck in the first innings, but the batsman had already been in the middle for a short period, and played the pace bowling with more assurance in the second innings.

== 29 June: Day Five ==
The final day started poorly for England; after failing to hit a leg stump full toss for a boundary from the first ball of the day, Compton edged Johnston to a diving Miller at second slip from the second ball of the morning. Compton had aimed a square drive, but the delivery was Johnston's variation ball, which went away instead of into the batsman. It took the outside edge and flew to a diving Miller, who knocked the ball upwards before falling on his back and completing the catch as the ball went down. Compton stood his ground and waited for the umpire to confirm whether Miller had caught the ball cleanly, and was duly given out by the unhesitating official. O'Reilly described Miller's effort as "perhaps the very best slips catch of the whole series and ... a real match-winner." England had lost a wicket without adding to their overnight total.

Yardley and Dollery took the score to 133 before Toshack bowled the former for 11. He trapped the new man Coxon two balls later in the same over for a duck, leaving England at 133/6. Coxon shuffled across his stumps and missed his first delivery, which hit him in front of the stumps and prompted a loud lbw appeal, and did the same thing to the next ball. During this spell, Toshack conceded only seven runs from eight overs, but was taken off as Bradman wanted to take the new ball and utilise Lindwall and Johnston. In the meantime, Dollery had continued to bat effectively, watching the ball closely onto his bat, and scoring three leg side boundaries from Johnston's bowling. Eight runs after Coxon's dismissal, Dollery shaped to duck a Lindwall bouncer, but it skidded through low and bowled him. Lindwall bowled Laker without scoring later in the same over to leave England at 141/8. Evans continued to resist stubbornly, remaining 24 not out as England were bowled out for 186 to cede a 409-run victory. Johnston had Bedser caught by Hassett for nine before Wright hit Toshack to Lindwall for four.

Toshack ended the innings with 5/40, while Lindwall and Johnston took 3/61 and 2/62 respectively. The dominance of Australia's three-man seam attack was such that the off spinner Johnson bowled only two of the 78.1 overs. Arlott said that while Toshack had the best figures, Lindwall was the pivotal figure. He said that when Lindwall "so patently disturbed Hutton he struck a blow at the morale of the English batting that was never overcome." O'Reilly said England's second innings "had developed into an undignified scramble" and had allowed the Australian bowlers to pick up wickets as though they were playing against a weak county team. He blamed the low standards of county cricket for allowing English batsmen to accumulate large tallies of runs easily while not testing them against formidable bowling. O'Reilly said they had become soft after many matches against weak opposition, which had not forced them to concentrate as intensely as they would have had to in Test cricket. The gross attendance was 132,000 and receipts were £43,000—a record for a Test in England.

== Aftermath ==
Wisden's verdict was that "this convincing victory confirmed the First Test realisations of Australia's clear superiority at all points. Only on the first day did England provide comparable opposition, and their Selectors must have been very disappointed at the lack of determination by some of the batsmen against an attack again below full strength ... Australia were the better team in batting, bowling, fielding and tactics, but England could not complain of lack of opportunities to wrest the initiative." Bowes considered England's attacking policy to be a failure and that, unlike the First Test, "there were no saving graces."

The main talking point after the Test was the controversial omission of England's leading batsman Hutton for the Third Test. The reason was said to be Hutton's struggles with Lindwall's short-pitched bowling in the Second Test. Observers noticed Hutton backing away from the fast bowlers. The English selectors believed such a sight would have a negative effect on the rest of the side—which was not in good batting form—as it was a poor example from a leading batsman. The omission generated considerable acrimony, and pleased the Australians, who felt Hutton was their most formidable opponent with the bat. Former Australian batsman Jack Fingleton pointed out that while Hutton had batted erratically and appeared uncomfortable in the previous Test, he also had a strong track record against the tourists, having made 52 and 64 for the Marylebone Cricket Club against Australia in the lead-up matches, a game in which no other Englishman passed 35, and made 94, 76 and 122 retired ill in his last three Test innings during the previous Ashes series of 1946–47. Hutton's position was taken by debutant George Emmett, who made only 10 and a duck in a rain-shortened draw, and was subsequently dropped for the Fourth Test.

Hutton's controversial exile thus ended after just one Test. However, both E. W. Swanton and Bill Bowes believed Hutton to be a better batsman once he returned to the side. He and Washbrook put on 168 for the first wicket, the first time England had put on more than 42 for the opening stand during the series, as the hosts went on to make 496, their highest score for the series. The pair added another triple-figure partnership in the second innings. Despite this, Australia's batsmen set a world record by chasing down 404 on the final day to win by seven wickets and take a series-winning 3–0 lead.

The events of the Second Test also affected the career paths of other players. England's inability to cut down the Australians resulted in the dropping of three of their bowlers—Wright, Laker and Coxon—after the Lord's Test. Coxon's debut was his only Test match, something believed to be caused more by off-field events than sporting merit. There was a story that he punched Compton—whom he disliked and considered self-important—in the dressing room, but Coxon always denied this. However, there was certainly an altercation and Coxon was never selected again. The match was the last ever Test for Brown, who had struggled out of position in the middle-order, scoring 73 runs at 24.33 in three Test innings during the season. He had scored centuries on his previous Test outings at Lord's in 1934 and 1938, but the third visit proved to be the end of his international career.

After the historic win in the Fourth Test, Australia had five tour matches before the final Test. They won three while two ended in rain-curtailed draws. Australia completed the series in style with an innings victory in the Fifth Test at The Oval to complete a 4–0 result. The Fifth Test was the last international match, and the tourists only had seven further matches to negotiate in order to fulfil Bradman's aim of going through the tour undefeated. Apart from two matches that were washed out after Australia had secured first innings leads of more than 200, Bradman's men had little difficulty, winning the remaining five fixtures by an innings. They thus became the first touring Test team to complete an English season undefeated, earning themselves the sobriquet The Invincibles.
