= Glue pot =

Glue pot may refer to:

- a device for keeping animal glue at its working temperature
- in cricket, a sticky wicket
