= First Test, 1948 Ashes series =

One of five tests in a 1948 cricket series between Australia and England

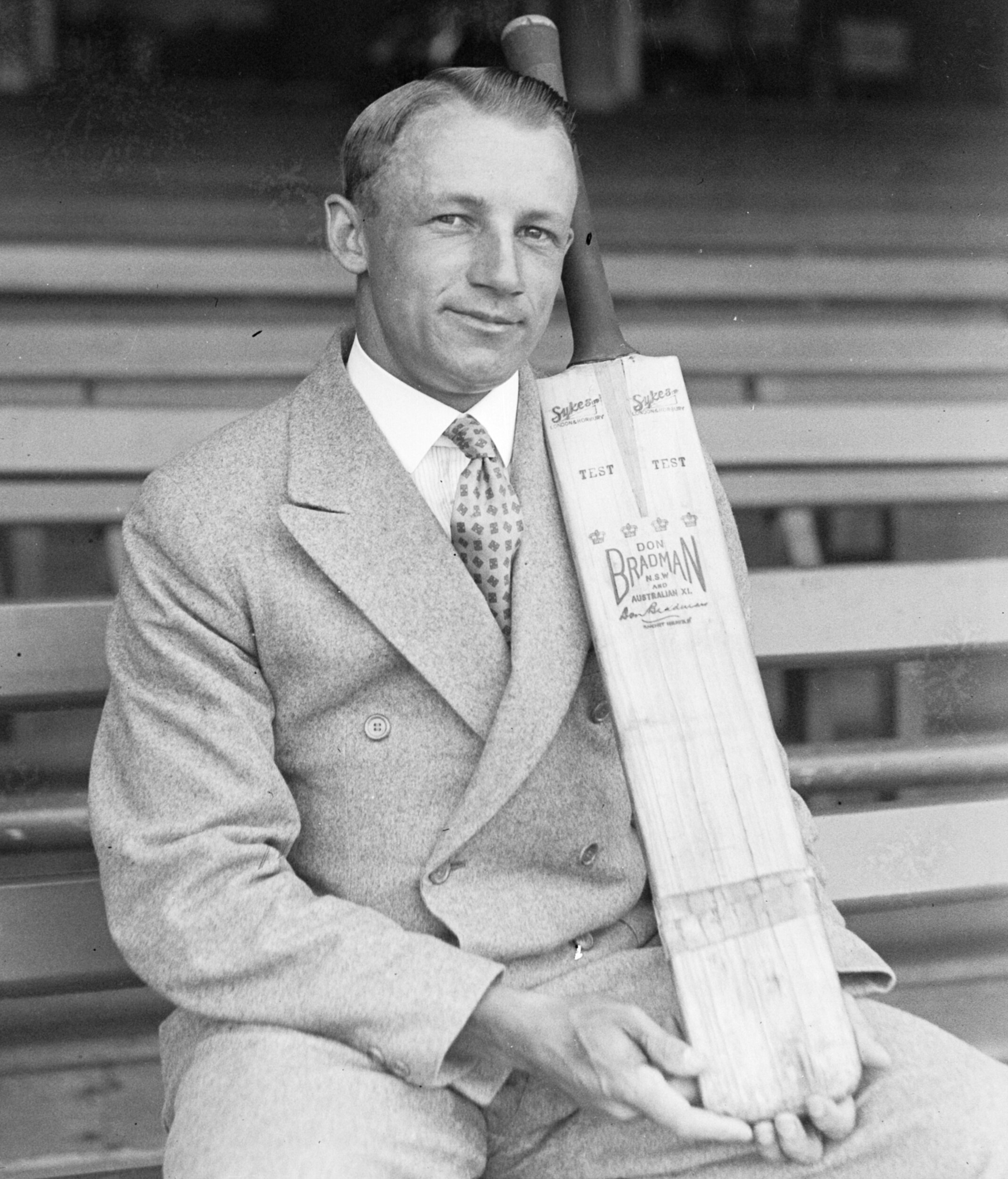
Australian captain Don Bradman scored a century in Australia's First Test win.

The First Test of the 1948 Ashes series was one of five Tests in The Ashes cricket series between Australia and England. The match was played at Trent Bridge in Nottingham from 10 to 15 June with a rest day on 13 June 1948. Australia won the match by eight wickets to take a 1–0 series lead.

The Australians started the match as firm favourites, having won the previous series against England 3–0; in the lead-up to the 1948 series, they had won 10 of their 12 tour matches in England, mostly by large margins. This included a crushing innings defeat in a match over the Marylebone Cricket Club—a team consisting almost entirely of Test-capped and current England players. England captain Norman Yardley won the toss and elected to bat on a cloudy day. After the first morning was interrupted by inclement weather, the Australian fast bowlers quickly made inroads into the English batting. Despite the loss of leading Australian paceman Ray Lindwall with a groin injury, the hosts had difficulty against his colleagues and fell to be 74 runs for the loss of eight wickets (74/8). However, a rearguard action by tail-enders Alec Bedser and Jim Laker saw England reach 165, Bill Johnston taking five wickets for 36 runs (5/36) for Australia, while compatriot Keith Miller took 3/38. Laker top-scored for the hosts with 63. The tourists then reached 17 without loss by stumps.

On the second day, Yardley attempted to slow the Australian batsmen by employing leg theory, a defensive strategy that sought more to contain the opposition than to attack. As England had batted poorly in the first innings, allowing Australia to take the lead quickly, the home team sought to slow the tourists' momentum and force a drawn match. Despite the tactics, Australia reached 293/4 at the end of the day's play, captain Donald Bradman having registered his 28th Test century. Although Bradman and his batsmen made gestures indicating frustration at England's stifling tactics, they remained patient as there was still much time left in the match for them to convert their dominance into a victory. The next morning, Bradman departed for 138, the first in a series of dismissals in the leg trap, but his vice-captain Lindsay Hassett continued, making 137 and putting on a century partnership with Lindwall as Australia were eventually out for 509, giving them a 344-run first innings lead. Laker was the leading bowler, taking 4/138. England reached 121/2 by stumps on the third day, which ended with a hostile crowd reaction to Miller, who bowled a large amount of bouncers at Len Hutton and Denis Compton.

After the rest day, play resumed in poor visibility, with frequent interruptions due to rain and bad light. England's batsmen progressed steadily as Australia struggled in Lindwall's absence, which forced his fellow bowlers to bear a greater workload. Hutton made 74 and Compton batted through the entire day to be unbeaten on 154, with England one run ahead at the close of play, on 345/6. Compton's innings in the difficult conditions was highly praised and his team still had a chance of hanging on for a draw if the lower order could bat for a large part of the final day. The next day, Australia prised out the remaining wickets and England were dismissed for 441, with Compton out for 184 after falling on his stumps. Miller and Johnston had both taken four wickets. Australia then made the 98 runs required for victory with the loss of two wickets; opener Sid Barnes made his second half-century for the match in the pursuit.

== Background ==
Prior to the First Test, Australia had played 12 first-class matches since arriving in England and starting their campaign in late-April, winning ten and drawing two. Eight of the victories were by an innings, and another was by eight wickets. One of the drawn matches, against Lancashire, was rain-affected, with the first day washed out entirely.

One of the tour matches was against the Marylebone Cricket Club (MCC), which fielded a team composed almost entirely of Test players. In what was effectively a dress rehearsal for the Tests, Australia fielded their full-strength team and won by an innings. The difference in Australia's team for the First Test was the omission of leg spinner Colin McCool, who had been struggling from a torn callus on his spinning finger, which prevented him from bowling long spells. It was thought that Bradman would play another leg spinner—Doug Ring—in McCool's place, but the Australian captain changed his mind on the first morning when rain was forecast. Bill Johnston was played in the hope of exploiting a wet wicket. In previous rain-affected matches on the tour, Johnston had been highly effective, taking match figures of 10/40 and 11/117 against Yorkshire and Hampshire respectively. Bill Brown, the reserve opener, played out of position in the middle-order, as he had against Worcestershire and the MCC. Aside from Brown and Johnston's inclusion, Australia's team was the same as that which started the previous Ashes series in 1946–47, which they won 3–0.

England lost their leg spinner Doug Wright before the match to lumbago, so the off spin of Jim Laker was brought in at late notice. Laker had struggled when he had played for Surrey and the MCC against Australia in the lead-up matches, taking 1/137 and 3/127 respectively. In the MCC match, the Australians had attacked him, taking nine sixes from his bowling in one 82-minute passage of play. Of the team that took to the field for the MCC, Len Hutton, Bill Edrich, Denis Compton, captain Norman Yardley, Laker and Jack Young were also selected for the First Test. Hutton scored 52 and 64 in the MCC match but nobody else managed to pass 26 in either innings. Young had bowled 55.2 overs in Australia's only innings, taking 4/155. Opener Jack Robertson was left out after scoring six and a duck, and Cyril Washbrook, who had played against Australia in the 1946–47 series, partnered Hutton. Joe Hardstaff junior had scored 107 for Nottinghamshire, the only century made against Australia in the lead-up matches, earning himself Test selection. Paceman Alec Bedser did not play in the MCC match, but had been a regular during England's last series against Australia in 1946–47, and had taken 4/104 for Surrey in their match against the tourists. Godfrey Evans, who kept wickets in the previous Ashes series, also gained Test selection. According to former England bowler Bill Bowes, England went into the match with the intention of securing a draw through the selection of defensive bowlers. The home team's bowlers would tie down the Australians, forcing the batsmen to take risks to score runs and thereby increasing the chances of dismissal; however, if rain produced a sticky wicket, the England attack might be able to dismiss Australia relatively easily. As such, England filled their team with batsmen and only played three frontline bowlers, Laker, Bedser and Young, and relied on Yardley, Edrich and Charlie Barnett to support them with their occasion seam bowling. It was speculated that England would use only two specialist bowlers; the all-rounder George Pope was in the squad and it was thought he would be used in place of one of the bowlers, but in the end, he was omitted, as was Reg Simpson. The latter had made 74 and 70 for Nottinghamshire against Australia and had impressed observers with his display, and was made twelfth man.

Before the start of the match, much of the attention was placed on the weather forecast and the prospects of rain. In their 12 tour matches leading up to the Tests, Australia had been almost completely untroubled by the opposition except in the two matches against Yorkshire and Hampshire on rain-affected pitches. In these two matches they came close to defeat after heavy batting collapses before recovering to victory. It was thus thought that the toss could be of great importance, especially if the team batting first had accumulated a substantial total by the time rain came. The match was the first Ashes Test to be played on English soil since the end of World War II.

== Scorecard ==
Umpires	(England) F. Chester (England) E. Cooke
Toss	England elected to bat first
Result	Australia won by eight wickets
Series impact	Australia lead 5-match series 1–0

=== England innings ===
England	First innings		Second innings	
Batsman	Method of dismissal	Runs	Method of dismissal	Runs
L. Hutton	b Miller	3	b Miller	74
C. Washbrook	c Brown b Lindwall	6	c Tallon b Miller	1
W. J. Edrich	b Johnston	18	c Tallon b Johnson	13
D. C. S. Compton	b Miller	19	hit wicket b Miller	184
J. Hardstaff jnr	c Miller b Johnston	0	c Hassett b Toshack	43
C. J. Barnett	b Johnston	8	c Miller b Johnston	6
* N. W. D. Yardley	lbw b Toshack	3	c & b Johnston	22
+ T. G. Evans	c Morris b Johnston	12	c Tallon b Johnston	50
J. C. Laker	c Tallon b Miller	63	b Miller	4
A. V. Bedser	c Brown b Johnston	22	not out	3
J. A. Young	not out	1	b Johnston	9
Extras	b 5; lb 5	10	b; 12 lb; 17 nb 3	32
Total	(79 overs)	165	(183 overs)	441

Australia	First innings				Second innings			
Bowler	Overs	Maidens	Runs	Wickets	Overs	Maidens	Runs	Wickets
R. R. Lindwall	13	5	30	1	–	–	–	–
K. R. Miller	19	8	38	3	44	10	125	4
W. A. Johnston	25	11	36	5	59	12	147	4
E. R. H. Toshack	14	8	28	1	33	14	60	1
I. W. G. Johnson	5	1	19	0	42	15	66	1
A. R. Morris	3	1	4	0	–	–	–	–
S. G. Barnes	–	–	–	–	5	2	11	0

=== Australia innings ===
Australia	First innings		Second innings	
Batsman	Method of dismissal	Runs	Method of dismissal	Runs
S. G. Barnes	c Evans b Laker	62	not out	64
A. R. Morris	b Laker	31	b Bedser	9
* D. G. Bradman	c Hutton b Bedser	138	c Hutton b Bedser	0
K. R. Miller	c Edrich b Laker	0		
W. A. Brown	lbw b Yardley	17		
A. L. Hassett	b Bedser	137	[4] not out	21
I. W. G. Johnson	b Laker	21		
+ D. Tallon	c & b Young	10		
R. R. Lindwall	c Evans b Yardley	42		
W. A. Johnston	not out	17		
E. R. H. Toshack	lbw b Bedser	19		
Extras	b 9; lb 4; nb 1; w 1	15	lb 2; nb 1; w 1	4
Total	(216.2 overs)	509	(28.3 overs)	98/2

England	First innings				Second innings			
Bowler	Overs	Maidens	Runs	Wickets	Overs	Maidens	Runs	Wickets
W. J. Edrich	18	1	72	0	4	0	20	0
A. V. Bedser	44.2	12	113	3	14.3	4	46	2
C. J. Barnett	17	5	36	0	–	–	–	–
J. A. Young	60	28	79	1	10	3	28	0
J. C. Laker	55	14	138	4	–	–	–	–
D. C. S. Compton	5	0	24	0	–	–	–	–
N. W. D. Yardley	17	6	32	2	–	–	–	–

== 10 June: Day One ==
England captain Norman Yardley won the toss and elected to bat despite the dull light; Trent Bridge had reputation for being favourable to batsmen, and in the previous Test between Australia and England at the ground in 1938, four Englishmen scored centuries as the hosts made 658, before Stan McCabe of Australia made 232 runs himself. The first innings set the pattern of the series as the English top order struggled against Australia's pace attack. Only twenty minutes of play was possible before lunch on the first day due to inclement weather, and the opening pair of Washbrook and Hutton had to deal with the contrasting bowling actions of Lindwall—with a low, somewhat round-arm action—and Miller, who extracted more bounce from a higher arm at the point of delivery. In the first two overs, the Australian pairing extracted little bounce and it seemed as though the hosts would be in a strong position to make a large score on a placid track if they made a solid start. Lindwall bowled the first ball of the match at a moderate pace, and Hutton pushed it square of the wicket on the off side for a single to start proceedings. Gradually, the Australian bowlers got into their rhythm and began to raise their pace. Miller induced an edge from Washbrook in his first over, but it bounced before reaching a fielder. In his second over, Miller bowled Hutton for three with a faster ball that skidded off the pitch to leave England at 9/1. The ball went between bat and pads as Hutton moved forward onto his front foot. The journalist and former Australian Test leg spinner Bill O'Reilly criticised Hutton for not moving his leg across to the pitch of the ball, thereby leaving a gap between bat and pad.

During the lunch interval, heavy rain fell, before the sun began to dry the pitch, making the ball skid through upon England's resumption at 13/1. Miller beat Washbrook's bat twice in one over soon after the resumption, but was unable to extract an edge. Lindwall reached his peak speed and Edrich edged to first slip, where Ian Johnson got both hands to the ball above his head, but failed to hold on. Edrich was on four at the time and this was part of a 20-minute passage of play during which England was unable to score. The next ball from Lindwall, Washbrook was caught on the run by Brown on the fine leg boundary after attempting to hook a bouncer pitched on the line of leg stump. It was to be the first of several times that Washbrook was dismissed while hooking, attracting substantial criticism. Washbrook's fall left England at 15/2 after 41 minutes of batting and brought Compton to the crease to join Edrich. Compton square drove Miller to the boundary for four, which prompted a retaliatory bouncer and a negative crowd reaction. Edrich was not scoring quickly but he defied the bowling of Miller and Lindwall as the English pair took the score to 46. Likewise, Compton was restraining his natural inclination to attack in an attempt to rebuild the innings after the two early wickets. During this period Brown made a series of one-handed run-saving stops in the field. The rain had also softened up the pitch and as a result, the playing surface did not offer much bounce.

Bradman then made a double change and brought on the two left-arm pacemen, Bill Johnston and Ernie Toshack. In his first over, Johnston bowled Edrich with a delivery that knocked the off stump out of the ground as the batsman leaned forward on the front foot. Two balls later, Johnston removed Hardstaff for a duck, caught by Miller in slips after attempting a cut. Wisden described the catch as "dazzling". Miller dived and balanced himself on his spine as he caught the ball heels over head. O'Reilly said: "Johnston had trimmed and embroidered the efforts of his opening bowlers and had swung the fortunes of the game completely in Australia's favour".

Bradman then decided to bring Miller back in place of Toshack. Two runs later, Compton was bowled attempting a leg sweep against Miller, his leg stump knocked out of the ground as he moved across his wickets. Five English wickets had fallen with only 48 runs on the board after 100 minutes of play; three batsmen had been dismissed in just ten minutes. O'Reilly said "There was nothing whatsoever to suggest that the pitch had been instrumental in the English debacle. It was purely and simply an exhilarating display of splendid bowling fit to be classed with any match-winning bowling performance in the story of Test cricket."

The collapse left Barnett and captain Yardley as the new men at the crease. Both players attacked the bowling but could not get their shots through the field for runs. Soon after, Lindwall was forced to leave the field due to a groin injury and did not bowl again. Barnett hit one four before Johnston bowled him for eight off the inside edge as he leaned onto the front foot. This brought Evans to the crease with the score at 60/6, and he attempted to disrupt the Australians' line and length by counter-attacking with a series of shots in front of the wicket. He drove the ball forward of point to the boundary for four, and was then given two lives. He hit Johnston hard to cover, but the catch went through Bradman for another boundary. The second chance of a catch went through Bradman's hand and struck the Australian captain in the abdomen. However, the missed opportunities cost the tourists little; Evans hit a ball strongly but it was caught at close range at short leg by Morris. Without further addition to the score, Toshack trapped Yardley, who had lingered at the crease for 26 minutes in accumulating three runs, leg before wicket (lbw) with a ball that straightened after pitching, leaving the score at 74/8.

England was facing the prospect of setting a new record for the lowest Test innings score at Trent Bridge, worse than the 112 made by England against Warwick Armstrong's Australians in 1921. However, a late fightback averted the unwanted record. Laker and Bedser, both from Surrey, joined forces and scored more than half of England's total, adding 89 runs in only 73 minutes. Laker's innings was highlighted by hooking and driving, while Bedser defended stoutly and drove in front of the wicket, much to the delight of the Nottingham crowd, who had appeared to have become depressed by the collapse of England's batsmen. At first, Bradman did not appear concerned by the partnership between the two bowlers from Surrey—it was thought the Australian captain may have been happy for England to continue batting so his top order would not have to bat in fading light towards the end of the afternoon, but he became anxious as the total continued to mount and both Bedser and Laker appeared comfortable. O'Reilly speculated that both players had batted confidently as their home ground in Surrey—The Oval—had a reputation for being batsman-friendly, and that as they would have had to contend with opposition batsmen who had the benefit of consistently favourable conditions, then they should also prepare so they too could capitalise on their opportunities with the willow. According to English commentator John Arlott, the playing surface was easier for batting than it had been at the start of the day, "but the difference was not such as to cause hesitation in the best batsmen in England".

Eventually, Australia was forced to take the second new ball, and Bedser was finally removed by Johnston and Miller had Laker caught behind two runs later, ending England's innings at 165. Laker top-scored with 63 in 101 minutes, with six boundaries, having reached his first 50 in only 60 minutes. O'Reilly said "There was nothing about his batting to suggest that luck was going his way or that he was short of batting experience." Johnston ended with 5/36, a display characterised with his accuracy and variations in pace and swing. Miller took 3/38 and a catch, while Lindwall and Toshack took one wicket each. Spin was not used in abundance, as Johnson bowled five overs and Morris three. Following England's struggles in the first innings, many pundits criticised Yardley's decision to bat first.

Australia had less than 15 minutes of batting before the scheduled close of play. Barnes made an appeal against the light after the first ball of the innings, which was a wide by Edrich. Barnes walked down the pitch and reportedly muttered to umpire Frank Chester in a casual tone "Eh, the light!", which allegedly shocked the arbiter. During the previous Ashes series in Australia, Barnes had continuously made time-wasting appeals against the light, which forced cricket administrators to limit the batting team to one appeal; if this was declined it would be up to the umpires to offer an adjournment. Despite the appeal against the light, the Australians showed little desire to be watchful against Edrich's bowling, scoring 11 runs from his two overs. Morris and Barnes successfully negotiated the new ball bowling of Edrich and Bedser. They reached stumps at 17 without loss, with Morris on 10 and Barnes on six. Barnes had been fortunate, edging both Edrich and Bedser through the slip cordon, and Yardley's decision to place his bowlers Young and Bedser in that region raised surprise; bowlers tend to lack the agility and reflexes needed for such positions. At this stage, following their tail-end resistance, England were in a good position with runs on the board if rain struck overnight and caused a sticky wicket, forcing the Australians to bat in hostile conditions the following day.

== 11 June: Day Two ==
Ideal batting conditions and clear weather greeted the players on the second day. After only four overs had been bowled in total the previous afternoon, Edrich was relieved of the new ball, which was given to Barnett, who accompanied Bedser. Both bowlers swung the ball into the right-handed Barnes and away from the left-handed Morris. Not a frontline bowler, Barnett focused on bowling defensively at medium pace, and the Australians wanted to make a safe start, so they decided to play him watchfully. This prompted some commentators to claim Barnett had allowed the Australians to settle into their rhythm by not trying to pressure them.

Barnes batted assuredly, while Morris was hesitant and shuffled around the crease. At one stage, Morris scored only seven runs in 55 minutes. Barnes was involved in some interplay with umpire Chester when the umpire failed to evade a drive from Morris and stopped it with his foot. Barnes picked the ball off the ground and handed it to the bowler, prompting a finger-wagging from Chester, to which Barnes responded by admonishing the umpire for blocking the ball. Morris unnecessarily played at a ball outside off stump from Bedser and edged it to wicket-keeper Evans, who dropped the catch. The batsman recomposed himself and hit Young's first ball—a full toss—for runs as Australia passed 50 without loss. After the wayward start, Young began to bowl with consistent accuracy.

Barnes and Morris took the score to 73 before the latter was bowled for 31 by Laker after two hours of batting. Morris tried to force a ball from Laker away, but hit it from the middle of his bat into his back pad, and the ball rebounded onto the stumps. Bradman came in and Yardley set a defensive field, employing leg theory to slow the scoring. The English leader packed the leg side with fielders, including two short legs, and ordered Bedser to bowl at leg stump. Bradman almost inside-edged the second ball onto his stumps, before defending uneasily for a period. With Laker stopping the scoring at the other end, Bradman managed only four runs in his first 20 minutes of batting. The Australian captain regarded Bedser as the finest seam bowler he faced in his career, and he batted in a circumspect manner as he sought to establish himself. At the other end, Bradman misjudged a ball from Laker and an incorrectly executed cut shot narrowly went wide of the slip fielder. Now aged 40, Bradman's reflexes had slowed and he no longer started his innings as confidently as he had done in the past. Barnes then reached his half-century after 135 minutes, pulling Barnett for four, and the Australians passed 100 before lunch after 125 minutes of batting. At the adjournment, the tourists were 104/1.

The score had progressed to 121 when Barnes tried to cut Laker, but only edged it onto the thigh of wicket-keeper Evans. The ball bounced away and the gloveman turned around and took a one-handed diving catch to dismiss Barnes for 62. Umpire Cooke was unsure of whether Barnes had hit the ball into the ground before Evans took the catch, and consulted with Chester, who had been standing at point on the other side of the field, before ruling the batsman out. Miller came in and was dismissed for a duck in Laker's next over without further addition to Australia's total. He failed to pick Laker's arm ball, which drifted away and went straight on instead of turning inwards, thereby clipping the outside edge of his bat. The ball flew to slip where Edrich completed the catch. The hard-hitting Miller had come in at No. 4, a position usually occupied by vice-captain Lindsay Hassett, a more sedate batsman, indicating that Bradman may have been looking to attack, but the change in batting order failed.

Laker to this point had taken 3/22 from 12.4 overs, having also top-scored in the first innings. All the while, Australia had been scoring slowly, as they would for most of the day. Brown came in at No. 5, but he had played most of his career as an opening batsman and looked unaccustomed to playing in the middle order, but Bradman brought him in ahead of Hassett as the new ball was due and Brown was used to starting his innings against pace bowlers and a new ball. The Australian captain decided to hasten the new ball by using his feet to get to the pitch of the ball to attack the spinners, hitting them through the off side. Yardley removed Laker—who was bowling effectively—from the attack and took the second new ball, bringing back Bedser and Edrich. However, this move backfired as Bradman struck his first boundary in over 80 minutes, and in the first 40 minutes after lunch, 43 runs were added. Yardley brought back his two spinners, and Australia passed England's total before the English captain brought himself on to bowl, trapping Brown—who was attempting to push the ball to mid-on—lbw with an off cutter in his first over. This ended a 64-run stand in 58 minutes and Hassett came in at 185/4. The Australian vice-captain came close to being caught when he knocked a ball from Bedser into the air, narrowly evading the grasp of Evans. Following the departure of Brown, the Australian scoring slowed as Bradman changed the team strategy to one of attempting to bat only once.

Yardley continued to employ a leg side field as he and Barnett bowled outside leg stump. During one over, Bradman did not attempt a single shot and then put his hands on his hips to express his displeasure at England's tactics. During the 15 minutes before tea, the Australian captain did not add a single run and was heckled by the crowd. Bradman reached tea on 78, and 55 minutes after the resumption of play, he cover drove Bedser to reach his century in 218 minutes. It was his 28th Test century, and his 18th in Ashes Tests. The last 29 runs took 70 minutes to accumulate, and it was one of Bradman's slower innings as Yardley focused on stopping runs rather than taking wickets. Nevertheless, Bradman had appeared comfortable after the early stages of his innings, and patiently scored most of his runs between mid-off and mid-on, often from the back foot. After Bradman had reached his milestone, many of the spectators began to leave the ground, content with what they had seen.

Bradman added a further 30 in the last hour to end with 130. Hassett also batted patiently, with one period of 20 minutes during which his score remained on 30. Australia batted to stumps on the second day without further loss, ending at 293/4, a lead of 128, with Hassett on 41. Young had bowled 32 overs to a leg side field, conceding only 53 runs. Fingleton described the afternoon day's play as a "very shrewd display of tactics" and said that although the proceedings and the progress of the Australian batsmen had been slow, they were "never ... dull". He added: "Bradman was on top by virtue of the facts that his side was well ahead of England, his own score was 130 and he was also unconquered." However, O'Reilly disagreed and said the Australians had not made enough progress as they should or could have. He said the batsmen failed to capitalise on the fatigue of the bowlers late in the day by not going on the attack in search of quick runs, instead of their "monotonously dull" strategy of patient attrition. O'Reilly claimed that in containing the opposition batsmen, the English attack had "shared the honours of the day with—if they did not actually steal them from—Bradman." Bradman and Hassett had made physical gestures indicating their displeasure at England's tactics, but O'Reilly felt Yardley had no choice after his team had squandered the initiative with their poor batting, and claimed it was up to the Australians to turn their advantage into a decisive, match-winning position. Arlott disagreed with O'Reilly, and said Australia "had time to build ... without risk or hurry on a gentle and accommodating ... wicket. Given a winning opportunity, it is characteristic of the Australians that they will never dissipate it by over-anxiety or by carelessness."

After the day's play, O'Reilly—a former teammate of Bradman who was covering the tour as a journalist—consulted Bedser on his use of leg theory. During his career O'Reilly had often attacked leg stump, and had devised a plan to ensnare Bradman.

== 12 June: Day Three ==
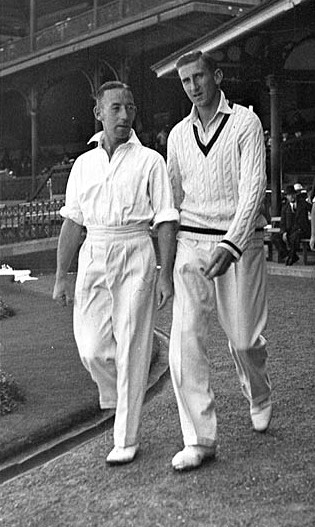
Hassett (pictured left in the late-1930s), scored 137 for Australia.

On the third morning, amid sunshine, Bradman resumed on 130, before progressing to 132 and becoming the first player to pass 1,000 runs for the English season. The Australian captain was not aware of the reason for the spontaneous crowd applause until being notified by wicket-keeper Evans.

Bedser was bowling and he soon implemented O'Reilly's plans. Hutton was moved from leg slip to a squarer position at short fine leg, around 11 metres from the bat. Two short legs and a mid-on were put in place. Bradman drove Bedser through cover for a boundary, but on the next ball, his innings terminated at 138 when he glanced an inswinger from Bedser straight to Hutton at short fine leg, who caught the ball without having to move. Bradman had batted for 290 minutes and faced 321 balls and as Johnson walked in to replace him with Australia at 305/5, Bedser waved to O'Reilly in the press box. When former Australian Test opener Jack Fingleton—a teammate of both Bradman and O'Reilly who was also working as a journalist—reported what his colleague had done, there was some debate as to whether O'Reilly's actions were treacherous.

Johnson made 21, including an edge over the slips cordon, before being bowled by Laker. He inside edged the ball onto his foot and it rolled back into his stumps. At the same time, Yardley pinned Hassett down with more leg theory. Laker bowled with one slip, while Young had none and had all of his fielders evenly spread in a circular formation. Tallon came in and took 39 minutes to compile 10 before hitting a return catch to the left-arm orthodox spin of Young. The scoring was very slow during this passage of play—Young delivered 11 consecutive maiden overs and his 26-over spell conceded only 14 runs. Hassett conducted himself in a humorous way, and Arlott said: "only his grace and concealed humour made his innings tolerable". He mainly scored from deflections and was for the most part prepared to take his time.

The injured Lindwall came out to bat at 365/7 without a runner to join Hassett, and appeared to be able to run twos and threes without significant difficulty. Hassett, who had scored only 30 runs in the first 75 minutes of the day, swept Laker for four and then hit him for the first six of the match. The Australian vice-captain added 53 in the two hours of the morning session to reach lunch at 94. The tourists were unhurried and remained patient as they had bowled England out quickly on the first day and there was still sufficient time to force a result with less than half the playing time elapsed.

After the break, Hassett reached his century after 305 minutes of batting, his first in Tests in England. He then accelerated, adding a further 37 runs in 49 minutes before being bowled by Bedser, having struck 20 fours and a six. The dismissal ended an eighth-wicket partnership of 107 with Lindwall, who was caught by Evans down the leg side four runs later, having scored 42 with seven fours. Australia's last-wicket pair of Johnston and Toshack wagged a further 33 runs in only 18 minutes, batting in a carefree and freewheeling manner, before Bedser trapped Toshack to end the innings at 509, leaving the tourists with a 344-run lead. Australia had batted for 216.2 overs, the longest innings in terms of overs and the highest total in the series. Yardley placed the majority of the bowling load on his spinners; Young (1/79) and Laker (4/138) delivered 60 and 55 overs respectively. Bedser bowled 44.2 overs, taking 3/113. The part-time seam bowlers, Edrich, Barnett and Yardley, bowled 18, 17 and 17 overs respectively. Australia had scored slowly but they had no need to take risks when there was so much time remaining. Yardley's leg theory tactics failed to coax them into losing their patience.

England thus started their second innings still 344 runs in arrears. Although Lindwall was able to run between the wickets, he did not take to the field in the second innings and the 12th man Neil Harvey took his place. Fingleton called Harvey "by far the most brilliant fieldsman of both sides". Yardley was sceptical as to whether Lindwall was sufficiently injured to be forced from the field, but did not formally object to Harvey's presence on the field. O'Reilly said Lindwall had demonstrated his mobility during his innings, was in no way "incapacitated" and that the English captain "must be condemned for carrying his concepts of sportsmanship too far" when no substitute was justified. O'Reilly decried the benefit Australia derived through the substitution, agreeing with Fingleton's judgement of Harvey was the tourists' best fielder by far. Arlott went further, calling Harvey the best fielder in the world.

Four of the first five runs were leg byes; Miller then removed Washbrook for one from a top-edged hook shot that was caught by Tallon. The batsman was displeased with the umpire's decision and gestured to a red mark on his shirt, indicating he felt the ball had touched his body and not the bat. Edrich came in and while he continued to struggle, he defiantly held up his end of the pitch. After scoring 13 from 43 minutes, Edrich was caught behind attempting a cut from the off spin of Johnson. He did not read the arm ball, which went straight on and took the outside edge, leaving England 39/2. Johnson was extracting a substantial amount of spin from the surface. This brought together England's leading batsmen, Hutton and Compton. The latter, coming in upon the fall of Edrich, ran down the pitch before the ball was bowled and had to quickly play a defensive shot on the run. He clipped the next ball to the leg side for two runs before surviving a confident leg before wicket appeal from Johnson when he was on eight. Compton appeared ready to walk off, but umpire Chester declined the appeal, much to his surprise. England reached 50 in 65 minutes and with Lindwall missing, Bradman had difficulties in spreading the workload among his depleted bowling resources. The part-time leg spin of Barnes was brought on as the fifth bowling option to give the others some time to rest, and Miller resumed bowling late in the day, delivering slow off spin to conserve energy. Hutton and Compton exploited the depleted bowling attack and began to score freely, using their placement to bisect the gaps between the fielders. The pair did not give a chance apart from when Compton aimed an uppish square drive from Johnston that flew in the air wide of cover point.

Hutton then leg glanced Miller, before cover driving and square cutting him in another over. All three shots went for four and he reached his fifty in 110 minutes. Miller responded to the spate of boundaries with a series of bouncers, including five in the last over of the day. One of these struck Hutton high on his left arm. The batsmen survived, but Miller received a hostile reaction from the crowd throughout his short-pitched barrage, including shouts of "Bodyline". The original practitioners of Bodyline, Harold Larwood and Bill Voce, were both from Nottinghamshire and played at Trent Bridge, and were later excluded from selection for England after being blamed for the ill-feeling caused by Bodyline. The Nottinghamshire supporters were still angry with how their players had been removed and were not happy that Miller was able to do something they saw to be equivalent. For his part, Miller appeared to be amused by the crowd reaction and revelled in it, grinning and flicking his hair. However, Hutton had the last word, glancing Miller down to fine leg for a four from the final ball of the day. England were 121/2, with Hutton and Compton on 63 and 36 respectively. Miller was widely jeered and heckled as he walked off the field, and the crowded surged towards him as he walked up the steps into the dressing room. O'Reilly defended Miller's use of short-pitched deliveries, pointing out that he had not employed a packed leg side field and had allowed the batsman the opportunity to score from hook and pull shots if he was willing to try; in contrast the packed Bodyline field meant batsmen would find little reward for such shots and defensive play would only lead to dismissal.

== 14 June: Day Four ==
The third day was followed by a rest day on Sunday and play resumed on the fourth morning, a Monday, with England still 223 runs in arrears. Before the start of play, the Nottinghamshire County Cricket Club (NCCC) secretary, H. A. Brown, broadcast an appeal to the gallery over the public address system to refrain from their heckling of Miller.

Let us keep Nottingham a place where Test matches can continue to be played. On Saturday the Australian, Miller, was booed and there was much subsequent publicity in the press. These Australians are great sportsmen. They stood by the Empire in the war and we should always be pleased to greet them. Let us show them how really pleased we are and give them a warmhearted greeting this morning.

The crowd responded by clapping as the Australians took to the field. The chairman of the NCCC reportedly apologised to Bradman in private for the crowd reaction to Miller.

As the new ball was due soon after the start of the play, Johnson and Toshack opened the attack as Bradman saved Johnston and Miller. In his first over, Johnson extracted sharp turn from one delivery that pitched outside off stump; not expecting much spin, Compton did not play a shot and was hit on the pads, but the umpire rejected the loud appeal for lbw. Otherwise, Hutton and Compton progressed steadily before the light deteriorated, although Johnson and Toshack were able to make the ball deviate regularly. Despite this, Bradman opted to have Miller take the new ball in the fifth over of the day as soon as it was available. Mindful of recent events, Miller refrained from bouncers during the morning. In the overcast conditions, Miller bowled a relatively full length and swung the ball; one of his deliveries beat Hutton and narrowly missed his stumps. At the other end, Johnston was also able to make the ball move sideways. Meanwhile, Compton appeared to be untroubled by the bowling. After half an hour of play, an unsuccessful appeal against the light was made as dark clouds hovered overhead. The rejection of the appeal made little difference, as a thunderstorm stopped proceedings for five minutes soon after. Shortly after the resumption, Miller bowled Hutton with an off cutter in the dark conditions, ending the 111-run partnership at 150/3. Hutton had made 74 runs in 168 minutes with 11 fours, and as in the first innings, he played forward to a ball without getting his front foot close to the bat, resulting in the delivery moving through the gap into the stumps. The wicket prompted the entrance of Hardstaff, and on the third ball he aimed a cut at a wide Miller delivery, and it again went low to second slip as in the first innings. However, this time Morris was in the position and the catch was dropped. It was part of an eventful over during which Hardstaff had many near-misses. He played and missed at one ball, inside edged another into his pads and edged another through the slips for two runs. Hardstaff had a reputation for being an uncertain starter, especially as he had a tendency to poke at deliveries outside his off stump, and the poor visibility further hindered him.

At 12:35, bad light stopped proceedings, and after two inspections the umpires resumed play, although Arlott claimed that visibility was "barely more than a half candle-power better". Hardstaff then batted aggressively, walking towards the bowling and hitting three cover drives for four from Miller and Johnston, in one period in which he outscored Compton 23 to four. He then edged through slips for another boundary before Compton swept Toshack to the fence. In the final over before the lunch break, Hardstaff square drove Johnston for four off the back foot and England adjourned at 191/3 with Compton on 63 and Hardstaff 31, still 153 in arrears. During the session, Bradman used Miller for 11 overs in a row in an attempt to pressure the Englishmen, while Toshack bowled defensively from the other end.

After lunch, the light was again poor, but England did not appeal to the umpires for an adjournment. Yardley wanted to bat now in poor visibility in order to eradicate the deficit and build a lead, so that if a shower came later and turned the pitch into a sticky wicket, Australia would have to chase a target on an erratic surface. Bradman anticipated rain, so he utilised Toshack and Johnson to bowl defensively to slow England's progress in the hope that the hosts would not have a lead by the time a sticky wicket materialised. As the umpires were obliged to not call off play unless the light was so poor as to endanger the batsman, the lack of pace of Johnson and Toshack forced play to continue as they posed no physical threat to the batsmen. In foggy and misty conditions, Hardstaff brought up England's 200 with a strongly-hit hook that almost hit Barnes. Compton then hit a boundary from Toshack, prompting Bradman to further stack the leg side with fielders in defensive positions. Scoring was slow as Toshack pinned down the batsmen with an effective leg stump line.

The innings was interrupted by bad light and upon the resumption of proceedings, poor visibility intervened for a second time with Compton on 97. After 55 minutes of delay, the umpires called the players back onto the field. Wisden said: "rarely can a Test Match have been played under such appalling conditions as on this day." Fingleton said the conditions were "pitiable" and lamented the "utmost gloom in which batsmen and fieldsmen had intense difficulty in sighting the ball". O'Reilly said it was "without doubt the worst light" under which he had seen a first-class match proceed. Compton brought up his third consecutive century at Trent Bridge by hitting a single to square leg, a "lovely century of stroke-play and patience" according to Fingleton. The innings had taken 227 minutes and included 12 fours, and Compton had regularly hit the ball in the middle of his bat despite the poor visibility, which meant the batsmen could not see the ball once it was close to the boundary. O'Reilly described the innings as "one of the greatest batting efforts in the story of Anglo-Australian Tests", adding that "his hundred runs was but a poor measure by which to estimate the value of his magnificent innings", deeming Compton's innings equivalent to a double century under normal conditions. Arlott said "In its manner, its style and its context it must rank with any innings he has ever played ... his innings will remain a Test classic."

Soon after, Compton edged to the slips from the bowling of Miller, but Johnson spilled the catch. Hardstaff fell for 43, lofting Toshack to Hassett on the leg side, having put on 93 with Compton. The ball looped up in the air and travelled half-way to the square leg boundary, but Hassett managed to keep track of its trajectory through the fog. Barnett came in and together with Compton added 21 runs in 33 minutes before edging Johnston to Miller, who completed a difficult catch in slips. Yardley came out to bat at 264/5 and Compton drove Miller square for four, provoking the bowler's first bouncer of the day. Compton hooked it away for two and Miller's next delivery slipped out of his hand and cleared Compton's head on the full to some jeering in the crowd. Such a ball is known as a beamer and is illegal because of the physical danger it poses to the batsman. Compton and Yardley put on a 57-run partnership in 66 minutes before Johnston held a return catch to dismiss Yardley for 22. England reached stumps at 345/6, just one run ahead of Australia, with Compton on 154 and Evans on 10. During the day, Johnston bowled the most overs, 30.

== 15 June: Day Five ==
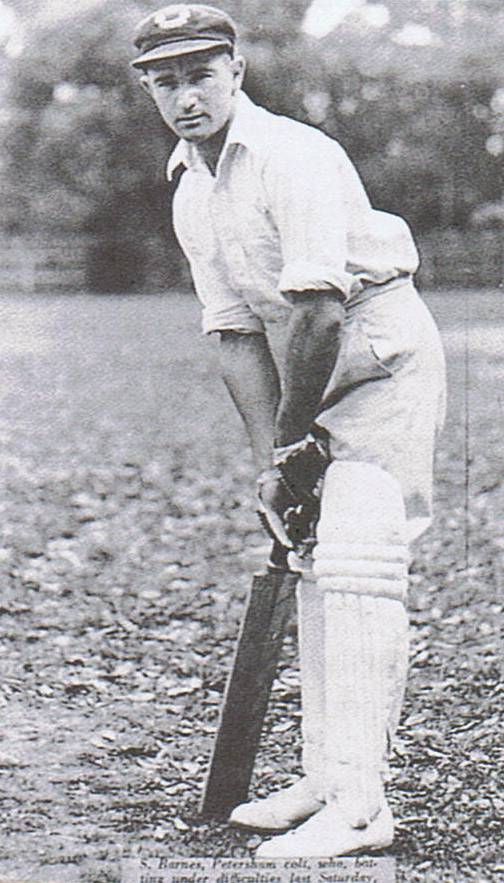
Barnes, pictured here in a photo at the age of 16, top-scored as Australia reached their target.

Compton and Evans continued to resist the Australians on the final morning, the latter being the more aggressive, and proceedings were briefly interrupted by rain less than 30 minutes after the start of play. At the time, it appeared the downpour might cause the match to end in a draw. After half an hour of stoppages, play resumed and Evans attacked, hitting two fours in quick succession. England's wicket-keeper played Johnston and Johnson confidently, but Bradman nevertheless persisted in giving Compton easy singles in order to bring Evans on strike so he could be targeted. For his part, Compton thought his partner could be relied upon and accepted the runs gifted to him by the Australian captain, while Evans continued to attack the bowling. The batsmen appealed against the light after the first stoppage of the day, but were turned down. Australia took the new ball, but the home team's batsmen continued to proceed steadily, Evans being particularly aggressive. After a second interruption for poor light, this time for ten minutes, play resumed, and England had added a further 60 runs to their overnight total to reach 405/6.

Miller bowled a fast and very short bouncer at Compton, who moved into position to hook before changing his mind and attempting to evade the ball. He lost balance and threw his legs apart, trying to avoid stepping onto his stumps. However, he was unsuccessful and was out hit wicket for 184, having batted for 413 minutes and hit 19 fours. Wisden said: "No praise could be too high for the manner in which Compton carried the side's responsibilities and defied a first-class attack in such trying circumstances." Fingleton said it was "a most depressing end to an innings that will live always". O'Reilly described it as "an unsavoury ending to one of the greatest fighting knocks in Test history". Compton's fall at 405/7 exposed the English tail and Australia quickly finished off the rest of the batsmen in 36 minutes. Miller bowled Laker—who played outside the line of the ball—for four, Evans reached 50 and was caught behind from Johnston, who then castled Young for nine. England were all out for 441 after 183 overs, leaving Australia a target of 98 in three hours. Lindwall's absence throughout the England innings meant the remaining four Australian frontline bowlers had bowled more than 32 overs each—Johnston delivered 59 and ended with 4/147 while Miller took 4/125 from 44 overs. Toshack and Johnson took a wicket each from 33 and 42 overs respectively.

Australia progressed quickly at the start of the chase. Barnes took 13 runs, including three boundaries, from the opening over, bowled by Bedser, while Morris again lacked fluency. However, Barnes continued to score quickly, and 24 runs came from the first four overs. Yardley tried to stop the run-scoring by bringing on Young, but Morris hit him for four and the bowler was promptly taken off. The tourists proceeded steadily to 38 from 32 minutes before Bedser bowled Morris for nine; after bowling several balls that moved away, Bedser caught out Morris with an inswinger. Morris had developed a habit of trying to defend the ball to the leg side while shuffling towards the off, and was not in a position to deal with a ball that hurried off the pitch. Bradman came to the crease and batted for 12 minutes without getting off the mark. From the 10th ball he faced, the Australian skipper was out for a duck, again caught by Hutton at short fine leg in Bedser's leg trap. Bradman showed obvious displeasure at allowing himself to be dismissed by the same trap in consecutive innings, and his departure left Australia at 48/2. It was the first time in four tours to England that Bradman had made a duck in a Test.

Upon Bradman's dismissal, dark clouds began to close in on the ground, and rain appeared to be a possible saviour for England. However, it never came, and meanwhile Hassett joined Barnes. The pair attacked, Hassett twice driving Bedser over the infield for boundaries, and later pulling another ball in the air for another four. Barnes gave Young an opportunity for a return catch, but the ball was dropped. The pair reached the target without further loss after 87 minutes of batting. Barnes ended on 64 with 11 boundaries, having been prolific on the square cut. He tied the scores with a swept boundary, and having taken a stump as souvenir, ran off the ground believing the match was over. Barnes tossed his souvenir back into the playing arena and returned to the field after noticing the reaction of the amused crowd and Hassett promptly hit the winning run.

== Aftermath ==
The First Test was a continuation of the trend of English batsmen being largely unable to cope with Australia's pacemen. Hutton was the only Englishman to pass 50 in the MCC match, and at Trent Bridge only he and Compton managed this feat. Apart from Hardstaff, none of the remaining batsmen passed 25. Wisden's verdict was that England fought back very well, but that avoiding defeat was almost impossible after their poor batting on the first day. Bowes considered the defensive English bowling display worthy of a draw, and blamed the first innings batting for the failure to prevent defeat. However, he believed the English tactics to be justified and should have been continued.

Australia's success came at a cost, with Lindwall injured and unable to bowl in the lead-up to the Second Test, missing the intervening matches against Northamptonshire and Yorkshire. The heavy workload on Miller caused by Lindwall's breaking down mid-Test generated severe back pain, and he was still not fully recovered by the start of the Second Test at Lord's. Lindwall was subjected to a thorough fitness test on the first morning of the Lord's Test. Bradman was not convinced of Lindwall's fitness, but the bowler's protestations were sufficient to convince his captain to risk his inclusion. Australia won the toss and elected to bat, allowing Lindwall further time to recover from his injury. Miller also played, but still nursing his back, was unfit to bowl.

Content with their convincing win at Trent Bridge, Australia made no changes to their team, while England made three, omitting Barnett, Hardstaff and Young due to a combination of injury and poor form. Barnett and Hardstaff never played another Test. Despite his injury, Lindwall played a key role in a heavy 409-run Australian victory, taking eight wickets. His bowling also led to the controversial omission of Hutton, who performed poorly at Lord's, for the Third Test. The reason was said to be Hutton's struggles with Lindwall's short-pitched bowling. This decision pleased the Australians, who regarded Hutton as their most formidable opponent with the bat.

On the field, the Australians continued to flourish. The Third Test was a rain-affected draw, and between the First and Fourth Tests, they won four of their five county matches, drawing the other. On the final day of the Fourth Test, Australia's batsmen set a world Test cricket record by scoring 404 to win the match, thereby taking a series-winning 3–0 lead.

After the historic win in the Fourth Test, Australia had five tour matches before the final Test. They won three while two ended in rain-curtailed draws. Australia then completed the series with an innings victory in the Fifth Test at The Oval to complete a 4–0 result. The Fifth Test was the last international match of the tour, and the tourists had seven further matches to negotiate in order to fulfil Bradman's aim of going through the English season undefeated. Apart from two washed-out matches, Bradman's men had little difficulty, winning the remaining five fixtures by an innings. They thus became the first touring Test team to complete an English season undefeated, earning themselves the sobriquet The Invincibles.
