= Bill Johnston (cricketer) =

Australian cricketer (1922–2007)

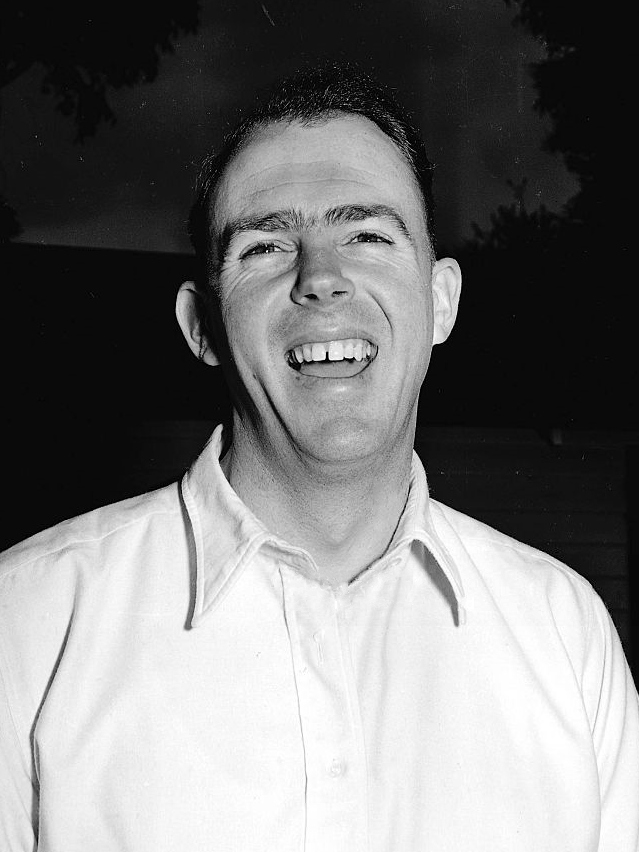
- Johnston in 1950

Personal information
- Full name: William Arras Johnston
- Born: 26 February 1922; Beeac, Victoria, Australia
- Died: 25 May 2007 (aged 85); Mosman, New South Wales, Australia
- Nickname: Big Bill
- Height: 187 cm (6 ft 2 in)
- Batting: Left-handed
- Bowling: Left-arm orthodox spin or fast medium
- Role: Specialist bowler

International information
- National side: Australia
- Test debut (cap 177): 28 November 1947 v India
- Last Test: 11 June 1955 v West Indies

Domestic team information
- Years: Team
- 1945–1955: Victoria

Career statistics
| Competition | Tests | FC |
|---|---|---|
| Matches | 40 | 142 |
| Runs scored | 273 | 1129 |
| Batting average | 11.37 | 12.68 |
| 100s/50s | 0/0 | 0/0 |
| Top score | 29 | 38 |
| Balls bowled | 11048 | 34576 |
| Wickets | 160 | 554 |
| Bowling average | 23.91 | 23.35 |
| 5 wickets in innings | 7 | 29 |
| 10 wickets in match | 0 | 6 |
| Best bowling | 6/44 | 8/52 |
| Catches/stumpings | 16/0 | 52/0 |
- Source: Cricketarchive.com, 29 February 2008

William Arras Johnston (26 February 1922 – 25 May 2007) was an Australian cricketer who played in forty Test matches from 1947 to 1955. A left arm pace bowler, as well as a left arm orthodox spinner, Johnston was best known as a spearhead of Don Bradman's undefeated 1948 touring team, well known as "The Invincibles". Johnston headed the wicket-taking lists in both Test and first-class matches on the tour, and was the last Australian to take over 100 wickets on a tour of England. In recognition of his performances, he was named by Wisden as one of its Cricketers of the Year in 1949. The publication stated that "no Australian made a greater personal contribution to the playing success of the 1948 side". Regarded by Bradman as Australia's greatest-ever left-arm bowler, Johnston was noted for his endurance in bowling pace with the new ball and spin when the ball had worn. He became the fastest bowler to reach 100 Test wickets in 1951–52, at the time averaging less than nineteen with the ball. By the end of the season, he had played 24 Tests and contributed 111 wickets. Australia won nineteen and lost only two of these Tests. In 1953, a knee injury forced him to remodel his bowling action, and he became less effective before retiring after aggravating the injury in 1955. In retirement, he worked in sales and marketing, and later ran his own businesses. He had two sons, one of whom became a cricket administrator. Johnston died at the age of 85 on 25 May 2007.

== Early years ==
Johnston took up cricket from an early age, playing with his elder brother Allan throughout the year on a backyard pitch on the family's dairy farm, owned by his father. Beeac's local team, which competed in the Colac District Association, occasionally had difficulty in assembling a full side. As a result, Johnston made his debut aged only twelve alongside his brother after an invitation from his schoolteacher. On debut, when a draw became a foregone conclusion, Johnston was allowed to bowl the final over, taking a wicket maiden. The following season, the brothers led Beeac's attack, continuing to do so after moving to Colac High School, where Bill became captain of the cricket and football teams and a prefect. Johnston left school at sixteen, working in Colac, before following Allan to Melbourne in 1939. He joined Richmond Cricket Club in the Third XI and took 6/16. After five games he was promoted to the Second XI, and made his first grade debut in the last game of the 1939–40 season. The following season, when nineteen, he was selected for Victoria's Sheffield Shield match against Queensland, but the Pearl Harbor attacks forced the cancelation of competitive cricket and the match did not go ahead. Johnston joined the Royal Australian Air Force along with his brother, serving for four years as a radar technician in northern Australia. It was at training camp that he first met Keith Miller. Johnston was not posted overseas, unlike his brother, who died in a plane crash in Ireland.

== First-class and Test debut ==
Prior to World War II, Johnston was a slow-medium and left-arm orthodox spin bowler, but during a practice session, he bowled a quicker ball to Jack Ryder a former Australian captain and Test batsman, who was now a Victorian and national selector. This prompted Ryder to wage a personal campaign to induce Johnston to become a pace bowler. At the same time, Richmond captain Jack Ledward wanted him to bowl spin. Upon the resumption of first-class cricket in 1945–46, Johnston made his first-class debut against Queensland and was entrusted with the responsibility of opening the attack. His maiden wicket was that of leading Test batsman Bill Brown. Johnston took a total of 1/84 in a ten-wicket win. He felt that the fast bowling was only for short periods with the new ball, and that he would be allowed to revert to spin bowling as the ball became older. He played a total of seven matches for the season and took 12 wickets at 35.08, with his best performance being 4/43 against arch-rivals New South Wales. As a result, he missed the national selection for the tour to New Zealand.

As opportunities for slow bowling became infrequent, he contemplated retirement. Although he dismissed Cyril Washbrook in the first over of Victoria's match against Wally Hammond's touring England team of 1946–47, he was sceptical about his pace bowling. After that match he did not take a wicket for the next two months. It took further encouragement from Australian captain Don Bradman after he played against Bradman's South Australians. Bradman told Johnston that the selectors thought highly of his potential as a medium-fast bowler to reinforce the short bursts of pace spearheads Ray Lindwall and Keith Miller and that pace bowlers were in short supply, whereas spinners were plentiful. In the same season, Colin McCool, Ian Johnson, Bruce Dooland and George Tribe had all played in Tests as specialist spinners. Johnston ended the season with only 12 wickets at 33.16 from six matches.

=== 1947–48 season ===
Johnston practised his pace bowling with new vigour, and at the start of the 1947–48 season, the fruits of his labour provided immediate dividends. In the opening match of the season, he delivered an opening burst of 3/0 for Victoria against the touring Indian team, removing Vinoo Mankad, Khandu Rangnekar and leading batsman Vijay Hazare, all for ducks. He took three more wickets in the second innings, to end with a match total of 6/96, including Hazare for the second time. Johnston was then called into an Australian XI that played the Indians before the Tests, in what was effectively a dress rehearsal. Although the hosts lost, Johnston took 6/141, all of his victims being frontline batsmen. In the last outing before the Tests, Johnston took 3/40 and 5/37 to set up a nine-wicket win over New South Wales, including the wickets of Test openers Sid Barnes and Arthur Morris with the new ball at the start of the match.

He was rewarded with selection for four of the five Tests against India, making his debut on a sticky wicket in the First Test in Brisbane. taking 2/17 as India fell for 58 in the first innings and 1/11 in the second as India fell for 98 following on, resulting in an innings defeat. Johnston's first Test wicket was Hemu Adhikari and he was not required to bat.

He took match figures of 5/48 in the Second Test in a drawn match. He batted for the first time, and remained unbeaten without scoring as Australia collapsed to be all out for 107 on sticky wicket. It was the only time that they conceded a first innings lead in the series, and persistent rain forced a draw.

The Third Test was Johnston's first Test in front of his home crowd of the Melbourne Cricket Ground. In the first innings, he scored his first runs at Test level, adding five before being run out. He removed both of India's openers, Chandu Sarwate and Mankad, and ended with 2/33 as Australia took a 103-run first innings lead. In the second innings, he did the same, bowling both players, and ended with 4/44 as Australia won by 233 runs. Johnston missed the Fourth Test in Adelaide due to injury but returned for the Fifth Test in Melbourne where he scored 23 not out and took match figures of 2/29 in another innings victory and Australia ended the summer with a 4–0 win. He headed the series averages with 16 wickets at 11.37. This ensured his selection for the 1948 tour of England as part of Bradman's Invincibles. However, Johnston was less successful outside the Tests, ending the summer with 20 wickets at 21.08.

== Invincibles tour ==
During the Ashes tour, Johnston roomed with Doug Ring who was a teammate in the Richmond and Victorian cricket teams. As Ring was a leg-spin bowler, he and Johnston were in direct competition for a place in the eleven. Australia had traditionally fielded its first-choice team in the tour opener, which was customarily against Worcestershire. When Johnston was omitted in favour of Ring, it appeared he would not be in Bradman's Test plans. Bradman changed his mind on the morning of the First Test in Trent Bridge when rain was forecast. Johnston was played in the hope of exploiting a wet wicket. He showed his credentials by bowling a total of 84 overs to help Australia to grind out a victory. England batted first and with strike bowler Ray Lindwall breaking down on the first day, Johnston removed Bill Edrich and Joe Hardstaff junior in one over to leave England at 4/46. He returned later in the innings to take 5/36 from 25 overs as England were bowled out for 165. After scoring an unbeaten 17 in a last-wicket partnership of 33, Johnston bowled 59 overs in the second innings to take 4/147 in Lindwall's absence. Johnston bowled the most overs of any player and was the leading wicket-taker for the match as Australia took a 1–0 lead.

He scored his career Test best of 29 in another tail-wagging performance before taking match figures of 4/105 as Australia took a 2–0 lead in the Second Test at Lord's. Johnston removed Denis Compton, England's leading run-scorer for the series, in both innings. In an effective containing performance, Johnston took 3/67 in the first innings of the Third Test at Old Trafford in 45.5 overs, before the match ended in a rain-affected draw. After supporting Lindwall in a 48-run partnership in the first innings of the Fourth Test, Johnston took 4/95 in the second innings, including three in the space of 16 runs. Australia went on to break the world record Test run-chases record to take a 3–0 lead. Johnston rounded off the series with match figures of 6/60 in the Fifth Test at The Oval from 43.3 overs. Johnston took the last three wickets in the match as Australia completed a 4–0 series result with an innings victory. In all, Johnston finished with 27 Test wickets at an average of 23.33, equal to Lindwall.

In both the Test and county matches during the 1948 tour, Johnston carried the heaviest workload, bowling nearly 200 overs more than any other member of the squad. He was the leading wicket-taker with 102 wickets at 16.42, and the last Australian to take a century of wickets on an Ashes tour. His best performances in the tour games included a match haul of 10/40 against Yorkshire at Bradford, bowling finger spin on a wet pitch, 8/68 against Somerset and 11/117 against Hampshire. After carrying a heavy workload in the early stages of the tour, he was used more sparingly in the latter stages. As the tour progressed Johnston improved his control as he restrained England's batsmen between the new ball bursts of Lindwall and Miller. Johnston finished the season at the top of the first-class bowling averages and was chosen as one of Wisden's Five Cricketers of the Year. Wisden opined that "no Australian made a greater personal contribution to the playing success of the 1948 side". Jack Fingleton wrote that Australia had never sent a greater left-hander to England.

== Later career ==
Upon returning to Australia, Johnston played in the 1948–49 Australian season, which was purely domestic with no visiting international teams. He took a total of 32 wickets at 31.84 in nine matches. He saved his best performance for New South Wales. He took 3/47 and 5/62 and his wickets included future Test batsmen Jim Burke, Jimmy de Courcy and Jack Moroney, but was unable to stave off defeat. Apart from a 5/65 against Queensland he never took more than three wickets in an innings for the season. He also managed his highest first-class score, recording 38 against South Australia.

=== 1949–50 tour of South Africa ===
Johnston's next international assignment was the 1949–50 tour to South Africa. The tour started badly; after taking a total of 5/28 in an innings win over Zululand in a non-first-class match, he fell asleep at the wheel outside Durban following a team function. He missed a turn, skidded across gravel and flipped and crashed his car. After a few hours, medical help arrived and Johnston was hospitalised. The team manager Chappie Dwyer was mistakenly informed that Johnston had died, and the bowler later described his injury as a "nine-iron divot in the top of my skull". Johnston started coughing up blood, and he and Dwyer sought to have the accident kept private. However, news was leaked back to Australia, and Johnston's mother fainted; her husband and other son had already died and she was fearful that her lone remaining relative had joined them. After complaining of chest pain, it was later discovered that Johnston had two broken ribs and he had to rest further.

Keith Miller was called to South Africa as emergency cover, but luckily for the Australians, there were almost two months of warm-up matches before the Tests started. Johnston recovered in time for the final tour match before the Tests, a match against a South African XI, effectively a full-strength Test team. Johnston took 2/81 in his only innings but it was enough for captain Lindsay Hassett to put him in the Test team.

Johnston took 2/21 in the first innings of the First Test against South Africa at Johannesburg and the hosts were forced to follow on. He took 6/44 including the last three wickets in the second innings, his career best innings figures in Test cricket, helping Australia take an innings victory and a 1–0 series lead. He removed Owen Wynne and Jack Cheetham in both innings. After going wicketless in the first innings, he took three wickets in the Second Test victory at Cape Town. He then took 11 wickets in the next two tour games, including 6/20 against Border. Johnston was more prominent in the Third Test at Durban with match figures of 8/114 as Australia took the series 3–0. South Africa had reached 2/242 in their first innings when Johnston removed their captain Dudley Nourse, precipitating a loss of 8/69 on a sticky wicket as the hosts were bowled out for 311. He ended with 4/75. Australia then collapsed for 75 on a sticky wicket and South Africa had a lead of 321 when they had reached 2/85 in their second innings. Johnston then removed John Nel and Billy Wade without further addition to the score, sparking a collapse of 8/14 that saw the home team all out for 99. Johnston ended with 4/39 and Australia went on to reach the victory target. On an erratic surface, six of his victims were bowled or lbw.

After taking 5/18 in an innings win over North Eastern Transvaal, Johnston was ineffective in the high-scoring drawn Fourth Test, taking 1/68. He took a total of 6/52 and scored 24 not out against Griqualand West, and finished the Test campaign with 3/22 in the Fifth Test in Port Elizabeth, taking all his wickets in the second innings as Australia completed an innings victory and took the series 4–0. It was a successful tour for Johnston, with 23 wickets at 17.04, taking the most wickets at the lowest average among the Australian pacemen among those who took more than three wickets. The entire first-class campaign was even more successful; Johnston took a total of 7/37 as the Australians ended their tour with an innings victory over a South African XI. Johnston ended the African summer with 53 wickets at 14.09.

=== 1950–51 season ===
The 1950–51 Ashes series was Australia's first home series in three years. In the opening match of the season for Victoria against the touring Englishmen, Johnston warmed up by scoring 30 and taking a total of 3/89, including the wickets of leading batsmen Compton and Hutton. In the First Test at Brisbane, England were caught on a sticky wicket and Johnston took 5/35, removing Reg Simpson, Washbrook, Evans, Compton and Arthur McIntyre, as England declared at 7/68. He then took 2/30 in the second innings, removing Evans and Compton for a second time as Australia won the match to take a 1–0 lead. In the Second Test at the MCG, Johnston took 2/28 and 4/26 as Australia scraped home by 28 runs, defending a target of only 179 on a cracked pitch. Johnston had quiet Third Test with only a total of 1/82 in an innings victory, but he returned to form in the Fourth Test in Adelaide with 3/58 and 4/73 in a 274-run win. He did much of the heavy lifting in the second innings, removing the top four English batsmen, Hutton, Simpson, Washbrook and Compton. Johnston struggled in the final Test with match figures of 1/91 as England won their only Test of the series. Johnston led the wicket takers list, with 22 at 19.18, as Australia took a 4–1 series triumph. Johnston had saved his best performances for the Tests; he managed only 19 wickets at 40.37 in eight matches for Victoria during the season, and never took more than two wickets in an innings. He was particularly unsuccessful against New South Wales, taking a total of 3/190 in two matches. Overall, he took 41 wickets at 29.00 for the season.

=== 1951–52 season ===
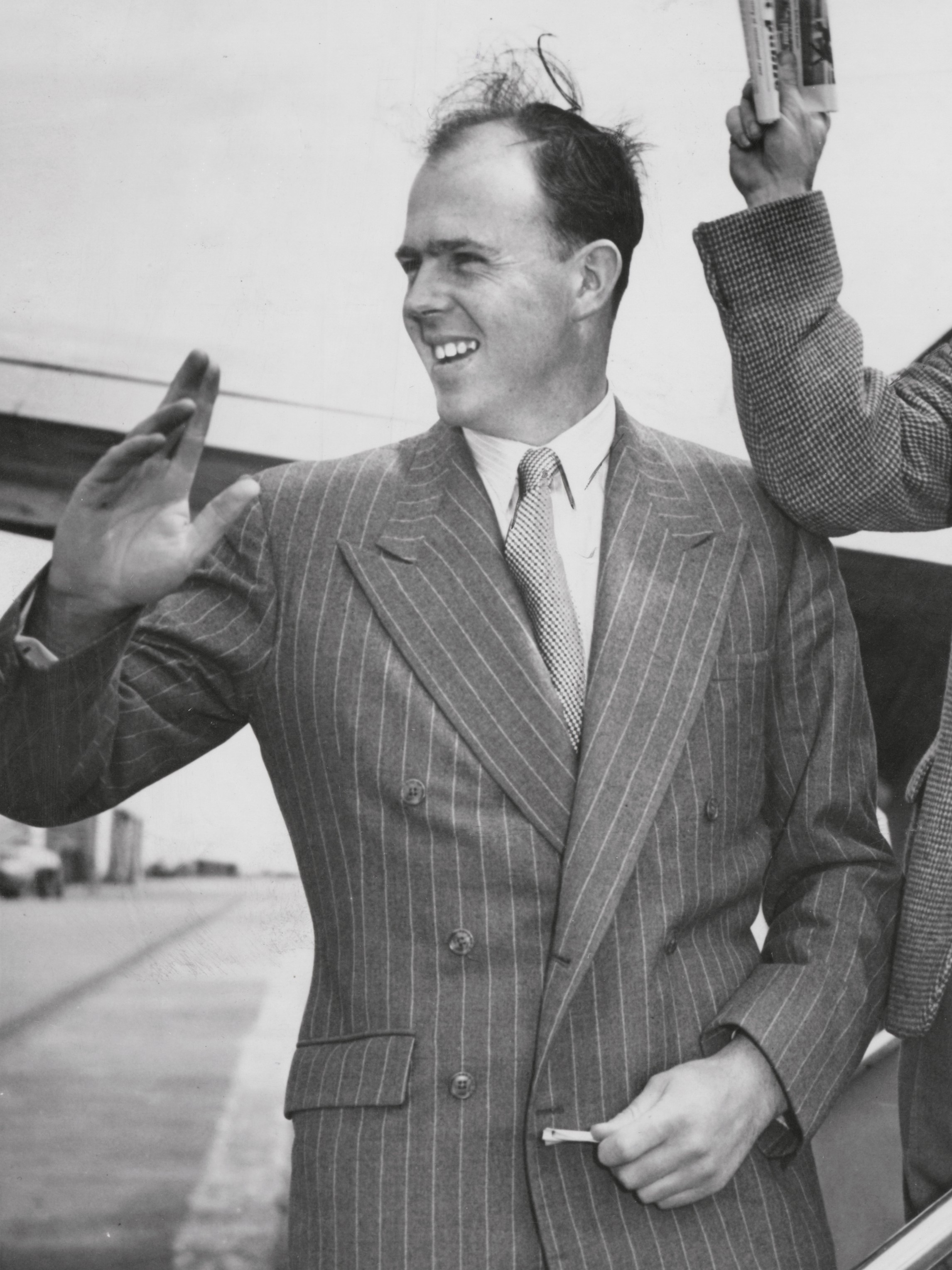
Johnston in 1951 heading for the 1951–52 Tests vs. West Indies

The 1951–52 home series was the first tour by the West Indies for two decades, and Johnston again led the wicket takers with 23 at 22.08, as Australia won the series 4–1. Johnston started the series steadily with match figures of 3/90 in the First Test, removing vice-captain Jeff Stollmeyer and leading batsmen Frank Worrell and Everton Weekes as Australia scraped home by three wickets.

He then took 3/80 and 2/61 and scored 28 in the Second Test, which Australia won by seven wickets. The Tests were interrupted by two consecutive matches between Victoria and New South Wales. In the first match, Johnston took 6/159 in the only innings of a high-scoring draw, including four Test batsmen. In the following match, he scored 32 before taking career best innings figures of 7/114. He removed Barnes, Morris, Moroney and Miller, before returning to dismiss future Test teammates Richie Benaud and Alan Davidson. Nevertheless, New South Wales took a 159-run lead, and after Victoria replied with 416, Johnston struck three times with the new ball, removing Barnes, Morris and Burke. He ended with 3/33 as New South Wales hung on for a draw at 7/166.

Johnston's best match performance came in the only loss in the Third Test at Adelaide. This happened when captain Lindsay Hassett was a late withdrawal due to injury, leaving Australia with an unbalanced team with only four specialist batsmen who could not consolidate the work done by the five specialist bowlers. It was in this match that Johnston passed 100 Test wickets, the fastest player to do so. Exploiting a wet patch at the striker's end, Johnston took 6/62 in the first innings as 22 wickets fell on the first day in treacherous batting conditions; however he was unable to stop an Australian defeat, taking only 1/50 in the second innings as the tourists reached their target of 233 with six wickets in hand.

At this stage Johnston was at the peak of his career in terms of bowling average and wickets taken per match. In his 24 Tests to the end of the series, he had taken 111 wickets at 19.22, with Australia winning 19 and losing two. In the Fourth Test in Melbourne, Johnston took match figures of 5/110, removing Weekes in both innings, before coming to the crease in the second innings to partner Doug Ring. Australia were 9/222 in pursuit of 260 for victory, with the series finely poised 2–1. The crowd of 30,000 and the constabulary were resigned to an Australian defeat, with the police officers moving into position to stop the customary pitch invasion at the end of the match. However, the Richmond teammates had other ideas and put together a last wicket partnership of 38, which sealed an Australian victory by one wicket. Ring thought that playing for a draw was impractical, so he decided to attack, while Johnston attempted to hold up his end with a series of defensive shots. The West Indian captain John Goddard placed his fielders halfway to the boundary, allowing Johnston to easily take singles, while Ring was able to clear the infield easily. The Richmond pair thought that Goddard's captaincy was poor. Johnston eventually brought up the winning run by turning Frank Worrell for a single behind square leg, 35 minutes after he came to the crease.

As a result, the mayor of Richmond granted the pair the freedom of the city. The scoreboard at Punt Road Oval, Richmond's home ground was named the Ring-Johnston scoreboard in honour of their feat. Johnston took match figures of 3/55 in the Fifth Test as Australia completed the series with a win. Johnston ended the season by taking a total of 7/86 in Victoria's innings win over South Australia. He ended the entire first-class season with 54 wickets at 20.63.

== Decline ==
=== 1952–53 series ===
Johnston could not maintain his form in the 1952–53 home series against South Africa. In the three matches leading up the Tests, he took only six wickets at 44.83 for Victoria. Johnston took match figures of 3/83, 2/114 and 2/97 as the first three Tests were won, lost and won, respectively. In the meantime, he took his career-best performance at first-class level, taking 8/52 in the first innings of a match against Queensland, which remained his best first-class innings analysis. He added 2/59 in the second innings to help set up a nine-wicket win. In the return match, he took 4/92 and 6/54 to set up a seven-wicket win, with six of his victims being Test players.

In the Fourth Test at Adelaide, both Lindwall and Miller broke down in the middle of match, leaving Australia two bowlers short. In their absence, Johnston took 5/110 and 2/67 but Australia were unable to force a win. He sent down 587 balls for the entire match. Lindwall and Miller were unable to play in the Fifth Test, and in their absence, the South Africans were able to score heavily. Johnston had a large workload, taking 6/152 and 1/114 as the tourists won by six wickets to level the series 2–2. On this occasion, Johnston sent down 662 balls for the match. In the last two Tests, Johnston conceded more than 100 runs in three of the four innings with the increased burden in his colleagues' absence; the only previous occasion when he had conceded a century of runs in an innings was in the First Test against England in 1948 when Lindwall broke down mid-match. Johnston was again Australia's leading wicket-taker with 21 wickets, but his average of 35.10 was substantially higher than in previous seasons, as Australia struggled to a 2–2 series result. It was the first time Australia had not won a Test series since the 1938 Ashes tour. Yet, he remained the top ranked ICC Test Bowler for three consecutive years from 1950. His best effort against the South Africans was in the second tour match between Victoria and the tourists, in which he totalled 7/122. Aided by his two ten-wicket match hauls against Queensland, Johnston totalled 59 wickets at 26.47 for the season.

=== 1953 Ashes ===
After injuring his knee in a festival match at the beginning of the tour at East Molesey, Johnston attributed the injury to a lack of attention to detail. His new boots had spikes that were longer than usual, and the physiotherapist had failed to strap his ankle before the match. His knee soon failed. Johnston missed the first six first-class matches, and with it a month of cricket. He returned against the Minor Counties in late May and took 3/20 in an innings win. He staked his claim for selection in the final two tour matches before the Tests; he took 4/65 and 3/49 against Sussex and then led the way in a win over Hampshire, much as he did five years earlier, taking 5/75 and 4/21. He had taken 20 wickets at 13.35 in his four tour matches and was duly selected to play in the First Test at Trent Bridge. He was economical but unpenetrative, conceding 36 runs in 36 overs without taking a wicket in a rain-affected draw. Between Tests, he removed Hutton in both innings of a match against Yorkshire, but it came at a cost; he ended with 4/186. He took match figures of 4/161 in the Second Test but England held on for a draw with three wickets in hand, as a recurrence of the knee injury while fielding intervened again. He then had an operation to remove cartilage in his right knee; this allowed him more leg movement but also destabilised his knee. The same surgeon had operated on Compton's knee. After missing another month of cricket, Johnston returned with a remodelled action, and hauls of 4/51, 6/63 and 6/39 against Surrey, Glamorgan and Essex respectively, saw Johnston return for the Fifth Test at The Oval. Although the pitch was helpful for spin, a total of 74 overs in the match yielded 3/146, as Johnston was unable rekindle the form of 1948 following his knee injury. Compton and Edrich batted cautiously to ensure the victory that saw England reclaim the Ashes 1–0. He managed only seven Test wickets at 49.00, but his first-class form remained strong. After the Tests, Johnston took match figures of 11/73 and 9/124 in consecutive matches against Kent and the South of England; Australia won both by an innings. He ended with 75 wickets at 20.54 for the entire tour. His injuries were considered a major factor in Australia's loss of the series.

=== 1953–54 season ===
Johnston returned to Australia and participated in the 1953–54 season, which was purely domestic. He continued his recent strong form against Queensland in the first match, taking 4/56 and 5/61 to set up a 254-run win. However, the rest of the season was not so productive; Johnston managed only 20 more wickets in the remaining seven matches at an average of almost 50. He ended the season with 29 wickets at 38.24.

=== 1954–55 Ashes ===
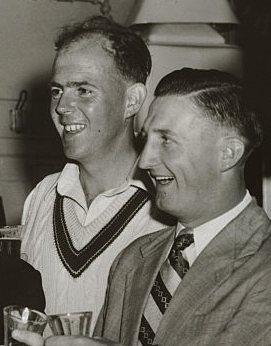
Bill Johnston and Les Favell on 31 December 1954

The 1954–55 series against England was to be Johnston's last Test success. He took 19 wickets at 22.26 in the first four Tests before missing the last as England took the low-scoring series 3–1. After going wicketless in the opening season's tour match against the Englishmen, Johnston took a total of 7/122 against South Australia and retained his place in the team. He took 3/106 as Australia won the First Test by an innings.

In the Second Test at Sydney, Johnston took 3/56 and 3/70 in a low-scoring match, removing Hutton in both innings. He had another notable innings when he joined Neil Harvey with 78 runs needed for victory on a difficult batting surface against the hostile pace of Frank Tyson and Brian Statham. In particular, Tyson was bowling with a strong tailwind and a slips cordon standing around 40 yards behind the bat. They put together a stubborn 39 run tenth-wicket partnership in 40 minutes, which gave Australia hope of an unlikely victory with Harvey still attacking. Harvey felt that Tyson was almost out of energy after a spell of extreme pace, and that the remaining bowlers were not beyond Johnston. However, a Tyson ball that was aimed at the ribcage saw Johnston fend at the ball; he was caught behind for 11, giving England a dramatic victory. After taking 1/26 in the first innings, Johnston took 5/85 in the second innings of his last Test performance in front of his home crowd at the MCG, with some tight spin on a dry surface. He removed Edrich for 13 and Peter May for 91 before cleaning up the tail with three quick wickets. This left Australia 240 to win but there was to be no fairytale as England won by 128 runs. Johnston then took match figures of 4/80 in the Fourth Test at Adelaide, in what was to be his last Test on Australian soil. Australia lost the match and England retained the Ashes; it was Australia's third consecutive Test defeat, the first time they had suffered a hat-trick of defeats since the infamous Bodyline series of 1932–33. Johnston had less success outside the Tests, which were played on bowler-friendly surfaces. He managed only 13 wickets at 30.38 in five matches.

=== 1954–55 tour of the West Indies ===
His career ended unhappily on Australia's first ever tour to the West Indies. He took match figures of 2/126 in the First Test in Kingston, Jamaica in a high-scoring win. These were to be his last Test wickets as he took a total of 0/60 in the Second Test in Trinidad. He was retained for the Third Test but injured himself early in the match while fielding and neither batted nor bowled. He was injured for the next month and missed the Fourth Test but returned for the Fifth. Early on the first day he suffered yet another knee injury as he changed direction while attempting to catch a Clyde Walcott pull shot. His teammates Alan Davidson and Peter Burge removed a bench from the dressing room wall and used it as an improvised stretcher to carry Johnston from the ground; his Test career ended without bowling or batting in either of his last two matches. His final Test wicket had been that of Glendon Gibbs in the second innings of the First Test. In six first-class matches for the tour, he managed only nine wickets at 51.00.

Johnston retired from first-class cricket after the tour, but played grade cricket for Richmond until the end of 1958–59, taking 452 wickets at 16.61 in his grade career.

== Style ==
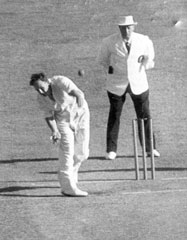
Johnston bowling against the West Indies at the Melbourne Cricket Ground in 1952.

Standing 188 cm, Johnston had a smooth ten-pace approach to the wicket, with an idiosyncratic dip of his head before the instant of delivery. He had success on moist English pitches, with deliveries from over the wicket because of the increased chances of leg before wicket decisions and to induce edges from balls angling across the batsmen. His stock ball swung into the right-hander, but he mixed this with an away swinger. The late swing in flight which generated the batsman's uncertainty over the direction in which the ball would move was responsible for the majority of Johnston's wickets in England. Although his pace was lower than that generated by Lindwall or Miller, he was noted for his accuracy and ability to revert to spin bowling on sticky wickets. Nevertheless, his casual run-up belied a deceptive pace. He possessed strong hands, attributed to his milking of the family's cattle herd. Johnston was an economical bowler, conceding only 2.07 runs per over. He was known for his elbow movement and flailing arms during his delivery action, with one commentator noting "one of these days an umpire will get a poke in the eye". Johnston also had a reputation of visibly enjoying himself on field, putting his hand on his hips and grinning, regardless of the result of his delivery. According to teammate Alan Walker, Johnston bowled at least as many bouncers as his colleagues, but because of his happy nature, observers thought that he eschewed the short ball.

His feet position were peculiar in that his front foot was parallel to the crease and his back foot perpendicular, the opposite of the conventional posture. This inhibited his follow through and put more stress on his ankles and shins. As a result, his right ankle had to be bound tightly in order to prevent jarring from his awkward delivery. He also followed the recommendation of Bill O'Reilly and tied a towel around his shins to cut off the circulation and to dull the pain. After the knee injury, he altered his action into a more conventional one so that his front foot pointed towards the batsman. This eased the pressure on his body, but his ability to move the ball diminished. Johnston was a keen student of the game, and although he did not see a state match until his debut, and watched only one Test before his debut, he supplemented his knowledge by reading cricket books. During his early first-class career, upon returning from matches, he would read articles by Bradman, Bert Oldfield and Arthur Mailey from a book given to him by his schoolteacher when he was a schoolboy.

Bradman rated him as "Australia's greatest left-hand bowler". As a result of his ability to bowl spin and pace, teammate Neil Harvey noted that the team effectively had 13 players: "we reckoned Bradman was worth two and Bill Johnston was worth two". Harvey felt that Johnston was the best team man, and Bill Brown noted Johnston's work ethic in bowling for long periods after Lindwall and Miller were given the best opportunities with the new ball. Ian Johnson described him as "the finest team man and tourist" in cricket and valued his personality, while Miller described him as "the most popular man in cricket". He sometimes amused others by demonstrating his double jointedness, wrapping his feet around the back of his neck. He is reputed to have nearly drowned when he attempted this in the bath at Lord's.

Johnston had a reputation as a poor batsman, averaging less than 13 in Tests and first-class matches without making a half century. He headed the averages in England in 1953, being not out 16 times out of 17 and averaging 102.00. He attributed this to "a lot of application, concentration and dedication", stating that "class always tells". When Hassett realised that Johnston was atop the batting averages, he told Johnston to tell the opposing captain of this fact and ask them to refrain from dismissing him. In the last match against T. N. Pearce's XI at Scarborough, English Test paceman Alec Bedser bowled wide of the stumps and advised Johnston not to do anything that would lose him his wicket. In 1954–55 he made 39 for the last wicket with Neil Harvey as they chased 78 for victory before he edged Frank Tyson to the wicket-keeper Godfrey Evans.

"Bill Johnston did his bit for his team with true Aussie grit. His speciality stroke was a right-handed, one-handed, back-handed, glancing scoop off the line of his bum – cricket's equivalent of tennis' back-handed retrieve. It bought him a dozen runs – plus a considerable amount of pain when he failed to make contact and the ball clipped his maximus gluteus!" – Frank Tyson, In the Eye of the Typhoon.

== Life after cricket ==
Johnston had a varied career after cricket, holding a variety of jobs. These included acting as a sales representative for Dunlop sports goods and shoes, a publican and an apartment building manager. In his later working career, he ran a post office on the Gold Coast of Queensland after he and his wife moved there. Outside cricket, Johnston also played baseball to a high standard. He won the world's junior championship for throwing a distance of 125 yards (114 m), and he broke the national baseball long-distance record with a 132-yard (121 m) throw in September 1945.

He was married to Judy and they had two sons, David and Peter. David played 10 matches for South Australia at first-class level; He later became an administrator and was the Chief Executive of the Tasmanian Cricket Association at the time of his father's death. After the death of his wife in 2004, Johnston moved from the Gold Coast to a Sydney nursing home to be close to his son Peter. He died peacefully there on 25 May 2007. Apart from his two sons and their families he is survived by a younger brother, Bruce.

== Test match performance ==
Key: *–not out

| | | Batting | | | | Bowling | | | |
| Opposition | Matches | Runs | Average | High Score | 100 / 50 | Runs | Wickets | Average | Best (Inns) |
|---|---|---|---|---|---|---|---|---|---|
| England | 17 | 138 | 10.61 | 29 | 0/0 | 1818 | 75 | 24.24 | 5/35 |
| India | 4 | 31 | 15.50 | 23* | 0/0 | 182 | 16 | 11.37 | 4/44 |
| South Africa | 10 | 39 | 7.80 | 12 | 0/0 | 1129 | 44 | 25.65 | 6/44 |
| West Indies | 9 | 65 | 16.25 | 28 | 0/0 | 697 | 25 | 27.88 | 6/62 |
| Overall | 40 | 273 | 11.37 | 29 | 0/0 | 3826 | 160 | 23.91 | 6/44 |
