= Jack Ledward =

Australian cricketer

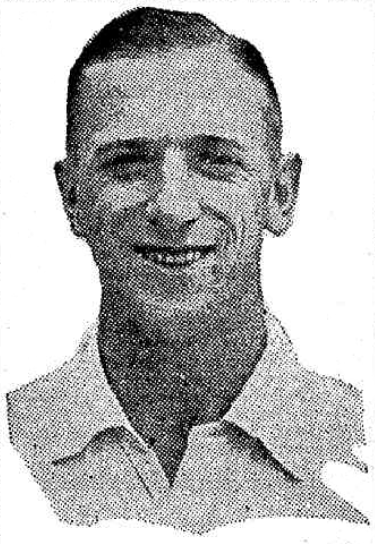

Personal information
- Full name: John Allan Ledward
- Born: 22 April 1909; Melbourne, Australia
- Died: 22 July 1997 (aged 88); Melbourne, Australia
- Batting: Right-handed
- Bowling: Right-arm medium-pace
- Role: Batsman

Domestic team information
- Years: Team
- 1934/35–1938/39: Victoria

Career statistics
Competition	First-class
Matches	22
Runs scored	1252
Batting average	39.12
100s/50s	2/6
Top score	154
Balls bowled	256
Wickets	1
Bowling average	116.00
5 wickets in innings	0
10 wickets in match	0
Best bowling	1/1
Catches/stumpings	10/–
- Source: Cricinfo, 25 January 2021

John Allan Ledward MBE (22 April 1909 – 22 July 1997) was an Australian cricketer and cricket administrator.

Ledward played 22 first-class cricket matches as a batsman for Victoria between 1935 and 1939. His highest score was 154 against Tasmania in 1935–36.

After 24 years with the National Bank of Australasia, Ledward served as secretary of the Victorian Cricket Association from 1951 to 1973, and secretary of the Australian Cricket Board of Control from 1954 to 1960. He was appointed MBE for his services to cricket in 1962. He was assistant manager of the Australian cricket team in England in 1964, and one of the key organisers of the Rest of the World tour in 1971–72.

Ledward played for Richmond in Melbourne district cricket for more than 20 years, captaining them to their first premiership in 1946–47. He was posthumously selected as captain of the Tigers Team of the Century.
