= Sticky wicket =

Cricket phrase

Sticky wicket (or sticky dog, or glue pot) is a metaphor used to describe a difficult circumstance. It originated as a term for difficult circumstances in the sport of cricket, caused by a damp and soft wicket.

== In cricket ==
The phrase comes from the game of cricket. "Wicket" has several meanings in cricket: in this case it refers to the rectangular area, also known as the pitch, in the centre of the cricket field between the stumps. The wicket is usually covered in a much shorter grass than the rest of the field or entirely bare, making it susceptible to variations in weather, which in turn cause the ball to bounce differently.

If rain falls and the wicket becomes wet, the ball may not bounce predictably, making it very difficult for the batsman. Furthermore, as the pitch dries, conditions can change swiftly, with spin bowling being especially devastating, as the ball can deviate laterally from straight by several feet. Once the wet surface begins to dry in a hot sun "the ball will rise sharply, steeply and erratically. A good length ball ... becomes a potential lethal delivery. Most batsmen on such wickets found it virtually impossible to survive let alone score" (Ashley Mallett). Certain cricketers developed reputations for their outstanding abilities to perform on sticky wickets. Australian Victor Trumper was one.

On occasions in the history of cricket unusual tactics have been employed to make the best of a sticky wicket. One example is the First Test in the 1950–51 Ashes series. As recorded in The Ashes' Strangest Moments, as the pitch at the Gabba began to dry, England declared their first innings at just 68/7, in order to exploit the conditions. Australia were even more extreme, declaring at 32/7. "[T]he ball proceeded to perform capers all against the laws of gravitation, and there came the craziest day's cricket imaginable, with twenty wickets falling for 130 runs and two declarations that must surely be unique in the annals of Test cricket." Australia won the match by 70 runs as the English second innings collapsed around Len Hutton. Hutton scored 62 runs but could only watch as Doug Wright spooned the final ball before lunch on day four to Ray Lindwall to end the game.

The Language of Cricket (1934) defines a sticky wicket as "when its surface is in a glutinous condition". Hence a "sticky wicket" refers to a difficult situation.

=== In modern day professional cricket ===
Modern professional cricket is played, around the world, on covered pitches. Sticky wickets are mostly seen in amateur cricket, but the phenomenon can occur when covers are defective, slow to be applied or, particularly in warm weather, the grass underneath "sweats" as moisture evaporates. When covers were introduced into England's County Championship, John Woodcock wrote an article for the 1981 Wisden Cricketers' Almanack, criticising the move, in an article titled, "Sticky dog is put down". He added, "I cannot forbear ... from lamenting ... a part of the very heritage of English cricket – a drying pitch and a sizzling sun."

=== In croquet ===
In the game of croquet, the phrase "sticky wicket" may refer to a hoop (wicket) that is difficult for a ball to go through because of the narrowness of the opening. This usage is confined to the United States.

== As a metaphor ==
An early example of the term in the cricket sense can be seen in Bell's Life in London, July 1882: "The ground ... was suffering from the effects of recent rain, and once more the Australians found themselves on a sticky wicket."

The term has entered into colloquial usage as a metaphor. The former leader of the Conservatives in the European Parliament, Tom Spencer, occasionally used to refer to batting on a sticky wicket to confuse the Parliament's interpreters, it being very difficult to translate into other languages.
