= Fourth Test, 1948 Ashes series =

One of five tests in a cricket series between Australia and England

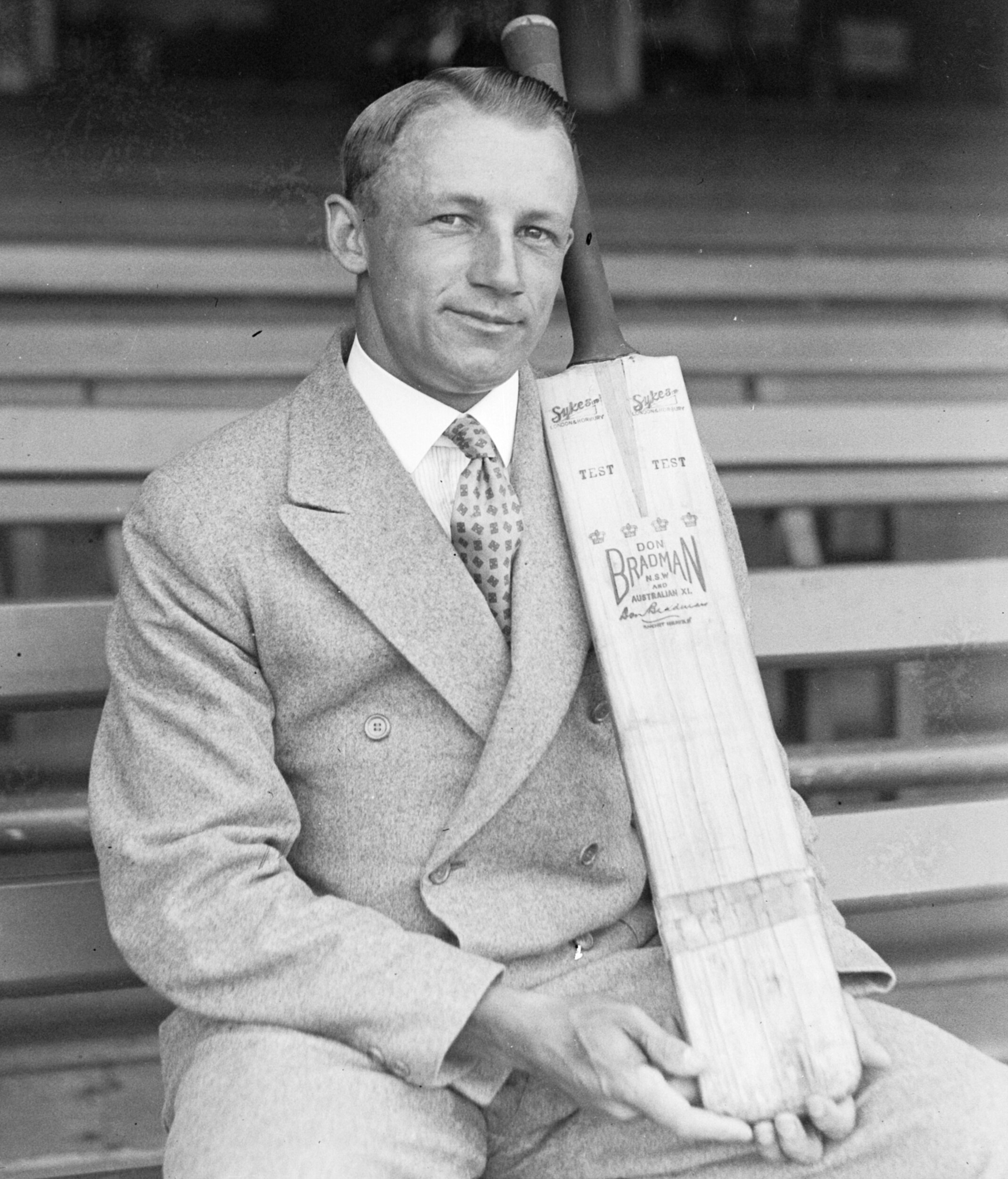
Having scored triple-centuries in two of his three previous Test matches at the ground, Don Bradman scored 173 not out to help Australia seal the series with a successful Test world record runchase of 404.

The Fourth Test of the 1948 Ashes series was one of five Tests in a cricket series between Australia and England. The match was played at Headingley Cricket Ground at Leeds from 22 to 27 July with a rest day on 25 July. Australia won the match by seven wickets to take an unassailable 3–0 series lead. In successfully chasing a target of 404, they set a new world record for the highest victorious runchase in Test history, a record lasting until 1976.

Needing to win the match to prevent an Australian series victory, England captain Norman Yardley won the toss and elected to bat. England continued to rearrange their team, making three changes in an attempt to find a combination that could challenge Australia, which made two changes forced by injury. Unlike the preceding Tests, England's openers were able to withstand the Australian new ball attack, and the partnership of Len Hutton and Cyril Washbrook put on 168 for the opening stand. Washbrook fell for 143 in the last over of the day, but England clearly had the better of the play, ending at 268/2 by stumps. Australia's bowlers were heavily criticised for their performance, which was seen as lethargic. The next day, England continued to amass runs, with Australia appearing unthreatening and unable to dislodge Bill Edrich and nightwatchman Alec Bedser, who batted until mid-afternoon. Bedser and Edrich then fell in quick succession for 79 and 111 respectively as England then collapsed and lost 8/73 to be all out for 496 late in the day. The hosts were heavily criticised for the collapse, which was largely due to unforced errors. Among the Australian bowlers, the wickets were shared. Australia then reached 63/1 in reply at stumps on day two.

Australia were in early trouble on the third morning when English bowler Dick Pollard removed Arthur Morris and captain Donald Bradman in the same over to leave the score at 68/3. However, Keith Miller (58) and Neil Harvey (112) launched a rapid counter-attack, adding 121 runs in 90 minutes in a display praised for its aesthetic beauty. They were later supported by Sam Loxton (93)—who hit five sixes—and Ray Lindwall (77), who both struck the ball powerfully. Australia ended the day at 457/9, having added 394 runs in one day, and 102 runs for the last two wickets to that point.

Australia were bowled out for 458 early on the fourth morning after the rest day, and England set about extending their lead, adding 129 for the first wicket, until both openers fell without further addition. In the meantime the workload on the Australian bowlers was heavy as Ernie Toshack had broken down in the first innings and unable to participate further. Edrich and Denis Compton took the score to 232/2 until a late collapse saw England reach stumps at 362/8. England batted on for two overs on the final day, declaring at 365/8. Bill Johnston was the most successful bowler with 4/95. This left Australia a target of 404 in less than a day, which would require a world record runchase, and allowed Yardley to use the heavy roller to break up the pitch, making batting even harder for the tourists. Most observers predicted an easy England win on a deteriorating surface. Australia started slowly, and Bradman joined Morris at 57/1 with 347 runs still needed in 257 minutes. They put together a stand of 301 in only 217 minutes, aided by erratic bowling, several missed catches and stumpings to help Australia to a win by seven wickets with 15 minutes remaining. Morris made 182 while Bradman was unbeaten on 173. The England selectors were heavily criticised after the match for failing to include a leg spinner in the team to exploit the favourable conditions. For the third time in a row, the match set a new record for the highest attendance at a Test in England. Test attendance would never be as high again, as cricket became less popular in the UK.

== Background ==
Australia had gone through the first two months of their tour of England undefeated. After winning 10 of the first 12 games—the other two being drawn—eight of these by an innings, they won the First Test by eight wickets. Between the Tests, they defeated Northamptonshire by an innings before drawing against Yorkshire. They crushed England by 409 runs in the Second Test at Lord's, before defeating Surrey by ten wickets and crushing Gloucestershire by an innings and 363 runs, after amassing 774/7 declared, their highest score of the season. The Third Test was drawn amid rain interruptions that cost a day and a half of play; England had been in a strong position, having been 316 runs ahead with seven wickets in hand in their second innings when rain came at the end of the third day. Australia proceeded to claim a ten-wicket triumph over Middlesex in their only county game before the Fourth Test.

Australia made two changes for the Test at Headingley. Middle-order batsman Neil Harvey replaced the injured opener Sid Barnes, who had collapsed while fielding during the Third Test after being hit in the ribs by a Dick Pollard pull shot. Australia declined to replace Barnes with the reserve opener Bill Brown, instead opting to use vice-captain Lindsay Hassett as a makeshift opener rather than in his customary position in the middle-order. Harvey had scored an unbeaten 73 and a 95 in the recent tour matches against Surrey and Gloucestershire respectively. Ron Saggers replaced first-choice wicket-keeper Don Tallon behind the stumps. Tallon's little left finger had swelled up after the Third Test, and he exacerbated the injury during the match against Middlesex. Former Australian Test leg spinner Bill O'Reilly criticised the Australians for opting to use only one spinner, pointing out that he and Chuck Fleetwood-Smith, a left-arm wrist spinner, had taken 17 wickets between them during the last Anglo-Australian Test at Headingley in 1938. O'Reilly cited a further instance of an Ashes Test at the same venue in 1934 in which he and Clarrie Grimmett had significant success for Australia. He wanted at least one of the two leg spinners, Colin McCool or Doug Ring, to have played alongside off spinner Ian Johnson, the only specialist spinner to have played in the three preceding Tests.

England made three changes. George Emmett was dropped after making 10 and a duck on his debut, and Len Hutton was recalled to take his opening position after being controversially omitted after the Second Test. England's leading batsman, Hutton had scored 74 in the First Test and made 52 and 64 for the Marylebone Cricket Club against Australia in the lead-up matches, when none of his teammates passed 26. O'Reilly praised the decision and the England selectors for stopping "all nonsense and phoney tactics". He further speculated that they would have done so irrespective of Hutton's form to avoid the wrath of the parochial Yorkshire spectators at Headingley, but in any case he regarded the original axing as scapegoating for England's two losses. O'Reilly believed the English administrators were penalising Hutton for angering them rather than poor performance. The decision to recall Hutton was met with wide approval from the cricketing public.

Jim Laker, the off spinner, replaced his left arm finger-spinning colleague Jack Young, who had taken 1/78 in the previous match against Australia for Middlesex, and totalled 3/174 in his two Tests in the series. Since his omission after the Second Test, Laker had taken 15 wickets in four matches for Surrey.

Middle-order batsman Tom Dollery, who had made only 38 in three innings in the Second and Third Tests, was replaced by all-rounder Ken Cranston. Playing mainly for Lancashire, Cranston had scored a century and four fifties, and taken 37 wickets in his last ten matches, but his previous outings against the tourists had not been successful. In two matches for the MCC and Lancashire against Australia, he had managed only 47 runs in three innings and a total of 2/109. English commentator John Arlott said Cranston's selection was an "indication that the selectors were again hankering after the non-existent Test all-rounder". O'Reilly regarded it as "the best team that the English selectors chose during the season" but felt they would be largely incapable of stopping an Australian series victory.

== Scorecard ==
Umpires	(England) F. Chester (England) H. G. Baldwin
Toss	England elected to bat first
Result	Australia won by seven wickets
Series impact	Australia leads 5-match series 3–0

=== England innings ===
England	First innings		Second innings	
Batsman	Method of dismissal	Runs	Method of dismissal	Runs
L. Hutton	b Lindwall	81	c Bradman b Johnson	57
C. Washbrook	c Lindwall b Johnston	143	c Harvey b Johnston	65
W. J. Edrich	c Morris b Johnson	111	lbw b Lindwall	54
A. V. Bedser	c & b Johnson	79	[9] c Hassett b Miller	17
D. C. S. Compton	c Saggers b Lindwall	23	[4] c Miller b Johnston	66
J. F. Crapp	b Toshack	5	[5] b Lindwall	18
* N. W. D. Yardley	b Miller	25	[6] c Harvey b Johnston	7
K. Cranston	b Loxton	10	[7] c Saggers b Johnston	0
+ T. G. Evans	c Hassett b Loxton	3	[8] not out	47
J. C. Laker	c Saggers b Loxton	4	not out	15
R. Pollard	not out	0		
Extras		12		19
Total	(192.1 overs)	496	(107 overs)	365/8d

Australia	First innings				Second innings			
Bowler	Overs	Maidens	Runs	Wickets	Overs	Maidens	Runs	Wickets
R. R. Lindwall	38	10	79	2	26	6	84	2
K. R. Miller	17.1	2	43	1	21	5	53	1
W. A. Johnston	38	12	86	1	29	5	95	4
E. R. H. Toshack	35	6	112	1	–	–	–	–
S. J. E. Loxton	26	4	55	3	10	2	29	0
I. W. G. Johnson	33	9	89	2	21	2	85	1
A. R. Morris	5	0	20	0	–	–	–	–

=== Australia innings ===
Australia	First innings		Second innings	
Batsman	Method of dismissal	Runs	Method of dismissal	Runs
A. R. Morris	c Cranston b Bedser	6	c Pollard b Yardley	182
A. L. Hassett	c Crapp b Pollard	13	c & b Compton	17
* D. G. Bradman	b Pollard	33	not out	173
K. R. Miller	c Edrich b Yardley	58	lbw b Cranston	12
R. N. Harvey	b Laker	112	not out	4
S. J. E. Loxton	b Yardley	93		
I. W. G. Johnson	c Cranston b Laker	10		
R. R. Lindwall	c Crapp b Bedser	77		
+ R. A. Saggers	st Evans b Laker	5		
W. A. Johnston	c Edrich b Bedser	13		
E. R. H. Toshack	not out	12		
Extras		26		16
Total	(136.2 overs)	458	(114.1 overs)	404/3

England	First innings				Second innings			
Bowler	Overs	Maidens	Runs	Wickets	Overs	Maidens	Runs	Wickets
A. V. Bedser	31.2	4	92	3	21	2	56	0
R. Pollard	38	6	104	2	22	6	55	0
K. Cranston	14	1	51	0	7.1	0	28	1
W. J. Edrich	3	0	19	0	–	–	–	–
J. C. Laker	30	8	113	3	32	11	93	0
N. W. D. Yardley	17	6	38	2	13	1	44	1
D. C. S. Compton	3	0	15	0	15	3	82	1
L. Hutton	–	–	–	–	4	1	30	0

== 22 July: Day One ==
As Australia were leading 2–0 after three Tests, England needed to win the last two matches to square the series. The hosts won the toss and elected to bat on an ideal batting pitch, which was seen as being unhelpful to fast bowling. Despite saying the pitch would be more conducive to spinners, O'Reilly described the playing strip as being "so green that it was difficult to decide where the out-field ended and the pitch began". Although fast, the outfield was bumpy in some parts. On some sections of the ground, there was a downward slope towards the edge of the playing arena, meaning the ball would accelerate downhill after being hit. At times the crowd spilled over the unfenced boundary, making the ground smaller than intended. All these factors meant scoring a boundary would be an easier task for the batsmen.

The England openers Cyril Washbrook and Len Hutton were given a loud reception as they walked out to bat, particularly the Yorkshire local Hutton. They had to face the Australian opening pair of Ray Lindwall and Keith Miller without the aid of sightscreen. It was the first time some of the Australians had played in a first-class match without a sightscreen, and those cricketers would later have to bat without its assistance. It was believed the Yorkshire administrators were reluctant to install a sightscreen as it would have taken up space and lowered the capacity of the ground, and thus the gate takings.

The large crowd roared boisterously as Hutton got off the mark with a single in the first over from Lindwall. At the other end, Miller bowled with less pace than normal and his opening over saw three full tosses. In Miller's first over, Hutton scored the first boundary of the day, driving past mid-off. Both Australian pacemen felt their legs for strained muscles, and after two overs O'Reilly described as "very innocuous", Miller was taken off. He was replaced by the left-arm pace of Bill Johnston, who appeared to be having back problems. Johnston had bowled the most overs of any bowler on the tour and his loss would have meant a heavy workload for his remaining colleagues. Johnston's apparent discomfort led onlookers to opine that he should have been given more rest in the county matches. The Australian bowlers appeared to be unsettled and Bradman made four bowling changes in the first 50 minutes of play.

Bradman thought his faster bowlers could not extract much bounce from the surface and soon removed the short leg fielder, and pursued a 6–3 off-side field with three slips and a deep point, trying to encourage the English openers to cut through the vacant area between the slips and extra cover. However, they declined Bradman's incentive and decided to bat in a low-risk manner, favouring straight-batted shots. After 80 minutes of batting, England's openers reached 50, the first time they had put on a half-century in the series. Hutton and Washbrook appeared set for the long haul, and did not react to the applause. They continued on cautiously, and persisted in eschewing the cross-batted cut and pull shots and relying on the safe accumulation of singles.

Hutton then edged a ball from left-arm medium pacer Ernie Toshack through the slips, and was dropped by Lindsay Hassett on 25 after flicking the ball behind square leg from the medium pace of Sam Loxton. Hutton then hit a square drive past point and Washbrook pulled a ball along the ground past Harvey, who was patrolling the midwicket boundary. England were 88 without loss at the lunch interval, with Hutton and Washbrook on 46 and 41 respectively. After a slow start, they had scored at almost a run a minute after passing 50, and five boundaries were hit from a spell of six overs by Lindwall.

Immediately after lunch, Lindwall made a confident appeal for leg before wicket (lbw) against Washbrook, but was not supported behind the stumps by a silent Saggers, and the umpire ruled against the tourists. At the other end, Hutton square drove Toshack for four, bringing up his fifty in 125 minutes. He followed this with another boundary in the same direction, and Washbrook back cut Lindwall for four more at the other end. This brought up England's 100, its first without loss for the series. Washbrook then on-drove a ball to the boundary and brought up his half-century, as Bradman pondered how to capture Australia's first wicket. England brought up 150 without loss 30 minutes before tea, and continued unhindered by two brief rain interruptions. Up to this point, the Australian bowling had been loose and inaccurate.

In bright sunshine, Bradman called on the off spin of Ian Johnson, who had delivered only three overs to this point, the rest of the proceedings having been through fast bowlers. Seeking to stem the flow of runs, Bradman set a defensive ring field, with no slip in place. While Johnson bowled two consecutive maidens, Washbrook took 24 at the other end to reach 85. O'Reilly said Bradman's defensive field settings "made the sorry admission of impotency". Bradman then called for the new ball with the score on 164, which Hutton on-drove for four from Lindwall. This took the opening partnership to 168, the best by England in the series. Washbrook refrained from the hook shot, which had caused him to lose his wicket on earlier occasions in the series. The partnership ended on the very next ball when Hutton went onto the front foot and was clean bowled by Lindwall, much to the dismay of the home crowd. Nevertheless, England had made a strong start, continuing their spirited showing in the previous Test. Washbrook was joined by Edrich, who had scored two 50s in the Third Test at Old Trafford after a lean start to the series. O'Reilly said the hosts' incoming batsmen had an ideal opportunity to amass a large score as "the Australian attack was completely at the mercy of the two Englishmen. It had lost all its sting and looked quite innocuous."

Washbrook reached his century with the score on 189/1; he reached triple figures half an hour after tea, having batted for 230 minutes and 16 boundaries. Washbrook avoided cross-batted shots and solidly defended shorter balls from the back foot, and profited from many over-pitched balls, which he drove away for boundaries. It was a welcome return to form for the opener from Lancashire. He had scored six, one, eight, 37 and 11 in his first five innings of the series, and was dropped on 21 in the second innings of the Third Test before proceeding to an unbeaten 85. After reaching his century, Washbrook began to play more expansively, driving in a manner that prompted Arlott to compare him to Frank Woolley.

Washbrook and Edrich batted until late in the first day, when the former was dismissed by Johnston for 143 in the last over before stumps, hitting a catch to Lindwall in the slips. His innings included 22 fours and the dismissal ended a second wicket partnership worth exactly 100 runs. Washbrook had been solid in his back foot defence and scored many runs from overpitched deliveries. Bedser was sent in as the nightwatchman, and he survived the last four balls from Johnston as England closed at 268/2 without further addition to the score, with Edrich, who played fluently as he had done in the previous Test, on 41. England's supporters were much buoyed with the situation at the end of the first day.

Former Test batsman Jack Fingleton, who covered the tour as a journalist, said Australia's day went "progressively downhill" and described the efforts as the country's worst day of bowling since World War II, citing the proliferation of full tosses. England had batted conservatively, steadily accumulating runs on a pitch unfavourable for fast bowlers, and Miller bowled placidly. Fingleton's fellow journalist and former playing colleague O'Reilly criticised the bowling display as the worst by the Australians on tour and said none of the bowlers could be excused. He lambasted the attack for operating "without object—hopelessly and meaninglessly" throughout the day. He decried the "so-called attack" for being "so blatantly inaccurate both in direction in length" and likened it to what was on offer in "another monotonously uninteresting county match". O'Reilly criticised Bradman's players for what he regarded as an overly casual and relaxed disposition in the morning, which gradually became more lethargic throughout the day as the home team strengthened their position. O'Reilly speculated that the tourists had become complacent because of their comfortable 2–0 series lead.

== 23 July: Day Two ==
The next day, England resumed hoping for more of what happened on the opening day. The ground was again full, with even more people squashed in than the previous day. The sun was obscured by heavy cloud cover, further hindering the visibility of a ground without a sightscreen. The two English batsmen were initially tentative and played and missed frequently, and only two singles were scored in the first 15 minutes of play. The England team frequently looked towards the sky; as they needed to win the match and were in a good position, they hoped that time would not be lost to rain. Bradman set a deep-set defensive field as he sought to have Lindwall and Johnston contain the batsmen before the third new ball became available. In all, England scored only five runs in the first half-hour, as the two batsmen sought to survive and be set when the new ball was taken and the Australian attack advantaged. During this time the main threat to the batsmen was Lindwall, who bowled a spell at high pace and unsettled Edrich, who sparred at a number of balls. As soon as it was possible, Bradman took the new ball, and Bedser endeavoured to keep his wicket intact to shield Denis Compton and the other middle-order batsmen from having to come in against a swinging ball. During this period Bedser did not attempt to exploit his strong physique to hit the ball hard. Continuing the defensive strategy of seeing off the new ball, it was not until the 48th minute of play that Edrich reached his 50 in 193 minutes, although he did miss several attempted cut shots that went past the outside edge. However, the hosts had seen off the new ball without losing a wicket. Bedser then glanced a ball for four; England scored only 22 runs in the first hour.

After the new ball bowlers had finished their new ball spells, Bradman reverted to the slower bowlers, using run-saving, defensive field settings. Immediately thereafter, Bedser targeted Toshack and hit three consecutive fours and a two in one over. Bradman immediately removed the left-armer and replaced him with Johnson. The Australian captain set his infield rather deep, effectively allowing the batsmen to take easy singles. Bedser responded cautiously, surveying Johnson's off spin for one over, before going on the attack in the next. He lofted Johnson into the leg side three times, yielding a six over long on and two fours, taking his score to 47. Bedser then hit a ball back to the bowler Loxton, which was almost caught, before reaching 50. Bradman also brought back a tired Miller to bowl medium pace off breaks, to no avail. England went to the lunch adjournment at 360/2, with Edrich on 76 and Bedser on 52. They had added 92 for the session, including 70 in the second hour. Lindwall had been the only bowler who caused much difficulty to the batsmen, particularly concerning Edrich, but the Englishmen dealt with his colleagues comfortably and Miller, nursing fitness concerns, was forced to bowl medium-paced off breaks.

Edrich and Bedser continued to amass runs after the break, and Lindwall appealed for lbw for the fourth time while Saggers remained silent. The pair brought up their century partnership as England scored 22 runs in the 30 minutes after lunch. Johnson came on, and Edrich lofted him for six to reach 96. Edrich then hit a long hop from the part-time wrist spin of Arthur Morris for four to reach his century. Bedser joined the attack and lifted Morris high over square leg for six, and Bradman replaced him with Toshack, who bowled a maiden. O'Reilly said that during the partnership, only Lindwall appeared capable of threatening the batsmen. He said Lindwall "kept slogging away, tirelessly retaining his pace and enthusiasm long after the other members of the attack had lost all signs of hostility ... Bradman could not afford to spare him from doing much more than his share of the galley-slave work." O'Reilly decried Lindwall's workload as excessive and potentially harmful to his longevity. However, against the run of play, Bedser was out caught and bowled by Johnson after almost three hours of batting, ending a 155-run stand for the third wicket. His on-drive was intercepted by the bowler, who dived across the pitch to his right-hand side to complete the catch. Bedser had struck eight fours and two sixes in a Test best of 79. He appeared upset by his dismissal, patting the ball back to the bowler when he could have hit it decisively. Edrich attempted to pull a Johnson long hop to the leg side, targeting the large gap between square leg and mid-on, but only ballooned the ball to Morris, who completed the catch diving forwards at wide mid-on. This came only three runs after Bedser's dismissal and left the score at 426/4. Edrich had batted for 314 minutes in compiling 111, with 13 fours and a six.

With two new batsmen—Compton and Jack Crapp—at the crease, Australia quickly made further inroads. Toshack bowled Crapp for five with an inside-edged half volley to leave England at 447/5. With this, Bradman took the new ball, and Compton exploited its hardness to score quickly. However, after the shine wore off and the ball went soft, Compton could not score for 25 minutes. O'Reilly decried Compton's "helpless" effort in failing to dispatch the tired Australian bowling as "the worst Test innings I have seen him play".

After Compton and captain Norman Yardley had added 26 for the sixth wicket, the former edged Lindwall down the leg side, and Saggers completed his first Test catch to leave England at 473/6. O'Reilly speculated that Compton's inability to make progress against the bowling deflated his colleagues. Playing in his second Test of the summer, Loxton bowled Ken Cranston for 10 to claim his first Ashes wicket, leaving England at 486/7. Cranston opted to not play at a ball that went straight into his leg stump. Loxton then removed Godfrey Evans and Jim Laker in quick succession as England fell to 496/9. Evans fell meekly, prodding a ball straight to Hassett at silly mid-on, prompting O'Reilly to deem Loxton "lucky to be on deck when the English tail were falling over themselves in their nervous speed to commit hara-kiri". In contrast, Laker edged Loxton down the leg side and it took a diving, low catch from Saggers to complete the dismissal. Umpire Baldwin asked his colleague Chester at square leg to confirm the ball had carried on the full before sending Laker back to the pavilion. Miller then bowled Yardley to end England's innings at 496. The home side had batted for 192.1 overs and lost their last eight wickets for the addition of 73 runs. Loxton took 3/55 while Lindwall and Johnson both took two apiece. However, the late wickets came at a cost for Australia, who lost the services of Toshack to a knee injury.

The collapse was heavily condemned. Fingleton said England "encountered something [ascendancy over Australia] which they had not known in post-war cricket with Australia and did not know how to handle it". O'Reilly called the capitulation a "disgustingly bad show". He asked what "was there to make bowlers ... pulverize the carefully chosen cream of English batting on a perfect wicket?" before concluding that the collapse was caused by "an unfortunate absence of concentration" rather than the opposition bowling. Both thought England had wasted an opportunity to put themselves in an unassailable position.

With Barnes injured, Hassett moved up from the middle order to open the innings with Morris. Using the new ball, Bedser removed Morris, who chipped the ball in the air to Cranston at mid-wicket and fell for six to leave Australia at 13/1. This brought Bradman to the crease and he was mobbed by the spectators on a ground where he had scored two triple centuries in Tests in 1930 and 1934. Many spectators surged onto the playing arena to greet Bradman, and he doffed his baggy green and raised his bat to acknowledge them. Fingleton wrote "on this field he [Bradman] has won his greatest honours; nowhere else has he been so idolatrously acclaimed".

Bradman got off the mark from his first ball, which Compton prevented from going for four with a diving stop near the boundary. Hassett was restrained while Bradman attacked, taking three fours from one Edrich over. Bradman was 31 and Hassett 13 as the tourists reached stumps at 63/1. The Australian captain did the majority of the scoring in the late afternoon, adding 31 in a partnership of 50. The tourists batted with little discomfort on a pitch that was still offering even bounce at a gentle pace.

== 24 July: Day Three ==
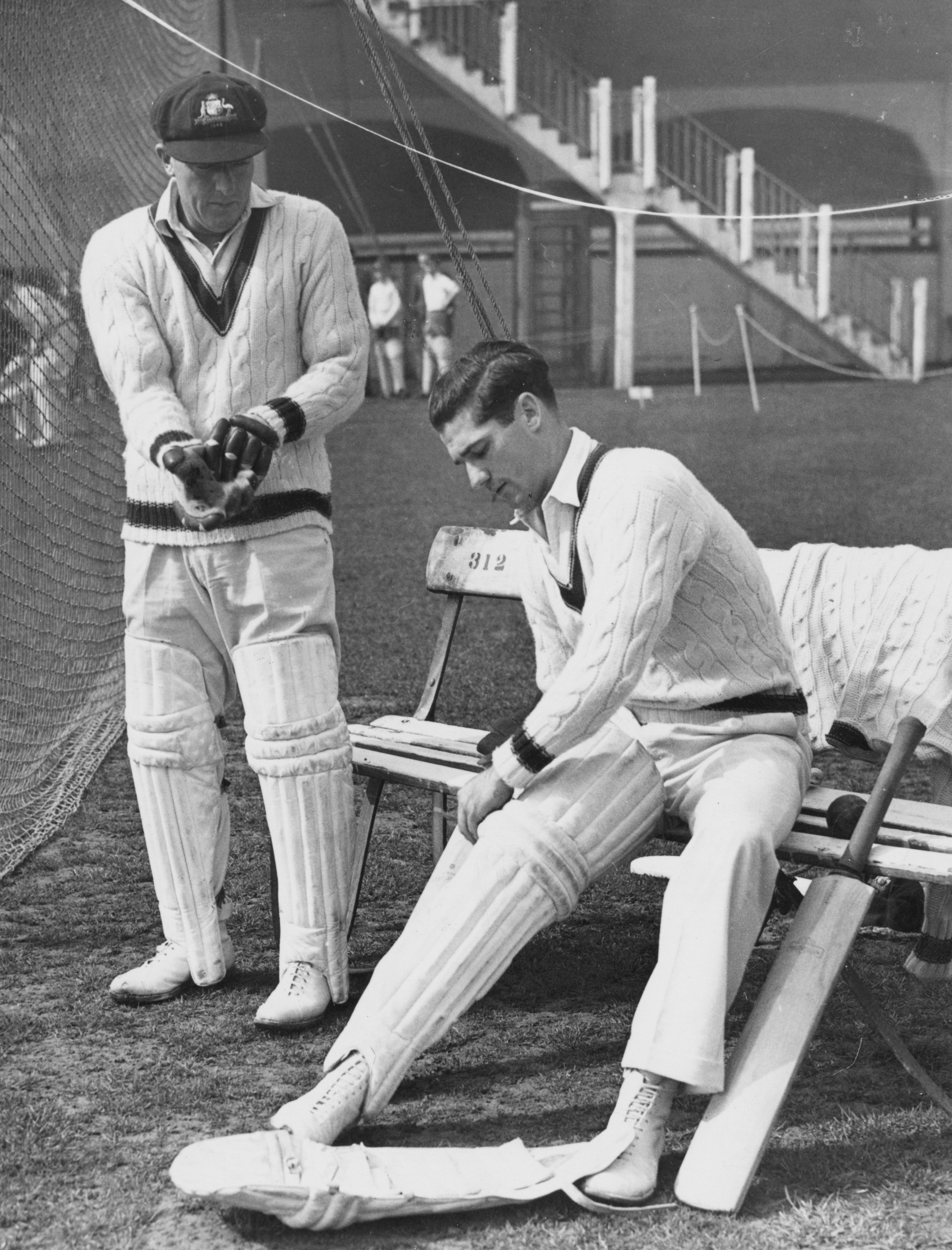
Loxton congratulates Harvey with his first century in a Test against England.

On the third morning, play resumed under hot and humid conditions. There had been rain on the pitch at 07:00, and Bradman resumed proceedings by taking a single from a Bedser no-ball. In same over, one ball reared from the pitch and moved into Bradman, hitting him in the groin, causing a delay as he recovered from the pain and recomposed himself before play resumed. In the second over of the day, Pollard got the second ball to lift. Caught out by the unexpected bounce, Hassett was unable to get out of the way and edged the ball to Crapp in the slips for 13. Miller came to the crease and drove his first ball for three runs, bringing Bradman on strike for the fourth ball of the over. Pollard then pitched a ball in the same place as he did to Hassett, but this time it skidded low off the pitch, deviated back in and knocked out Bradman's off stump for 33. According to O'Reilly, Bradman backed away from the ball as it cut off the pitch with a noticeable flinch. O'Reilly attributed Bradman's unwillingness to get behind the ball to the blow inflicted on him by Bedser in the previous over and the rearing ball that dismissed Hassett.

Sensing the importance of the two quick wickets, in particular that of Bradman, who had been so productive at Headingley, the crowd erupted. Australia were struggling at 68/3 as Harvey, playing his first Ashes Test and the youngest member of the squad at the age of 19, walked out bareheaded to join Miller at the crease. The tourists were more than 400 behind, and another wicket would expose the lower order and give England the opportunity to take a large first innings lead. Harvey told his senior partner "What's going on out here, eh? Let's get stuck into 'em". He got off the mark by forcing the ball behind point.

The pair launched a counterattack, Miller taking the lead. He hoisted off spinner Laker's first ball over the square leg fence for six. Miller shielded Harvey from Laker, as his younger partner was struggling against the off breaks that were turning away from him, including one that spun and bounced sharply to beating the outside edge. Miller drilled one off-drive off Laker for four, and after mis-hitting the next, much to the amusement of the crowd, hit the off spinner flat over his head, almost for six into the sightscreen. This allowed Australia to seize the initiative, and Harvey joined the fightback in the next over, hitting consecutive boundaries against Laker, the second of which almost cleared the playing area. He struck another boundary to reach 44, while Miller's score stayed on 42. After half an hour of play, the early morning life in the pitch appeared to have died out.

Miller then lifted Laker for another six over long off, hitting a spectator in the head. The English captain, noted for his ability to break partnerships with his occasional bowling, brought himself on. Miller responded by striking a four over long on from Yardley's bowling to reach 54. He drove the next ball through cover for four. The English skipper responded by stacking the leg side with outfielders and bowled outside leg stump, challenging Miller to attempt another hit for six. Yardley bowled a half-volley outside leg stump and the batsman obliged, but edged the ball off the back of his bat onto wicket-keeper Evans' head and was caught by a forward-diving Edrich at short fine leg.

The partnership had yielded 121 runs in 90 minutes, and was likened by Wisden Cricketers' Almanack to a "hurricane". Fingleton said he had never "known a more enjoyable hour" of "delectable cricket". He acclaimed Miller's innings as "one of the rarest gems in the Test collection of all time" and "a moment to live in the cricket memory". O'Reilly said Miller and Harvey had counter-attacked with "such joyful abandon that it would have been difficult, if not absolutely impossible, to gather from their methods of going about it that they were actually retrieving a tremendously difficult situation". The crowd was in raptures at both the batting and Edrich's catch. Arlott said "two of the greatest innings of all Test cricket were being played", and praised Miller for elevating "cricket to a point of aesthetic beauty".

Loxton came in to join Harvey at 189/4, who continued attacking, unperturbed by Miller's departure. Cranston came on and Harvey square drove and then hooked to deep square leg for two consecutive boundaries. Yardley moved a man from fine leg to the location where the previous hook had gone; Harvey responded by glancing a ball to where the fine leg fielder had been, collecting three more runs. Australia thus went to lunch at 204/4, with Harvey on 70.

After lunch, Australia scored slowly as Loxton struggled to find his fluency against the bowling. Yardley took the new ball in an attempt to trouble the batsmen with extra pace, but instead, Loxton began to settle in. The Australian lofted Pollard to the leg side, almost for six, and hit three fours off a subsequent Pollard over. Harvey accelerated as well, and 80 minutes into the middle session, reached his century to a loud reception as Australia passed 250. He had taken 177 minutes and hit 14 fours. Loxton then dominated the scoring in a display of power hitting. He brought up his 50 by hitting Cranston into the pavilion for six, eliciting spontaneous applause from the English players. The century stand yielded 105 runs in only 95 minutes. Harvey was out for 112 from 183 balls, bowled by Laker while playing a cross-batted sweep. His shot selection prompted Bradman to throw his head back in disappointment. Nevertheless, it was an innings noted for powerful driving on both sides of the wicket, and Harvey's fast scoring helped to wrest the match back from England's firm control. O'Reilly said the innings was one of "no inhibitions completely unspoiled by any preconceived plan to eliminate any particular shot". He added that it was "the very mirror of truth in the batting art", "delightfully untrammeled by the scourage of good advice or any other handicapping influence", and deemed Harvey's innings to be most pleasing he had seen since Stan McCabe's 232 at Trent Bridge in 1938.

Harvey's departure at 294/5 brought the first of the bowlers, Johnson, to the crease. This did not deter Loxton, who was particularly severe on Laker, lifting the off spinner for four more sixes, two over the leg side followed by consecutive off drives into the gallery. On each occasion, umpire Chester walked to the edge of the playing field and tried to inspect where the ball landed amongst the crowd, trying to see if the point of impact was beyond the original playing arena. They were ruled as sixes in any case and some thought Chester's actions to be more for theatrical than umpiring purposes. Laker refused to be deterred by the aggressive batting and continued to bowl normally by pursuing defensive off or leg theory. Johnson scored 10 before falling with the score at 329/6, hitting Laker to Cranston.

Australia was still some way behind when Lindwall replaced Johnson at the crease. Fifteen runs later, Yardley bowled Loxton for 93, who appeared disappointed at playing such a wild cross-batted swing with a maiden Test century beckoning. Saggers came in and managed only five in his first Test innings before being stumped after being lured out of his crease by Laker, who was still bowling in an attacking manner and flighting his deliveries, undeterred by the sixes Loxton had hit from him, rather than bowling leg theory. This left Australia at 355/8 ten minutes before tea, with only Johnston and Toshack remaining.

Lindwall hit out, scoring 77 in an innings marked by powerful driving and pulling, dominating stands of 48 and 55 with Johnston and Toshack respectively. He particularly liked to use his feet to get to the ball on the half-volley so he could hit lofted drives. Of the 103 added for the last two wickets, Johnston and Toshack managed only 25 between them. Johnston accompanied Lindwall for 80 minutes, before Toshack lasted the last 50 minutes until stumps, with Johnston as his runner. Australia were 457/9 at stumps, with Lindwall on 76 and Toshack on 12. During Lindwall's partnership with Johnston, Yardley bowled himself for over an hour, failing to bring on a frontline bowler in his stead despite being unable to dislodge the batsmen. Lindwall farmed the strike by trying to hit boundaries and twos during the over, but Yardley did not resort to the tactic of setting a deep field to yield a single to Lindwall to get the tailenders on strike. Despite Toshack and Johnston's lack of familiarity with having and acting as a runner respectively, and the resulting disorders in running between the wickets, Lindwall was able to manipulate the strike so he faced most of the balls. Lindwall's partners were able to survive against the English pacemen, leading O'Reilly to lament the absence of leg spinner Doug Wright, whose guile and flight was held in high regard by the Australians. O'Reilly thought Yardley may have bowled himself in an attempt to contain the Australians rather than dismiss them before the close of play, so his openers would not have to bat for a short period before stumps when the visitors' attack could have made inroads. However, Yardley was neither able to contain nor dismiss the Australian tail.

== 26 July: Day Four ==
Sunday was a rest day, and the match resumed on Monday morning. In the third over of the day, Lindwall was the last man out at 458, leaving Australia 38 runs in arrears on the first innings. Bradman's men had added only one run to its overnight score of 457/9. Bedser took the final wicket as Lindwall edged, and Crapp took the catch low down in the slips with his left hand. Bedser ended with 3/92 and Laker 3/113, while Pollard and Yardley ended with two wickets each. England's use of Cranston as an all rounder had not been successful; he conceded almost four runs per over without taking a wicket. Although England had only a slight lead, Australia had the disadvantage of being a bowler short due to Toshack's injury. This meant Johnston and Johnson among the slower bowlers were left to exploit the wearing pitch.

For the remainder of the fourth day, England set about extending their lead. Early in the innings, the capacity crowd encroached substantially onto the ground and the umpires spent eight minutes trying to force them back to the edge of the official playing area, but they again spilled over. Initially, Hutton and Washbrook played cautiously to see off the new ball before trying to lift the run rate. Lindwall's first two overs were maidens, but Hutton and Washbrook scored 21 runs from his next five overs, while taking only five from Miller's six overs. The English batsmen attacked the bowling and reinforced their aggressive strokeplay with quick running. England reached lunch at 72/0 with Hutton on 40 and Washbrook on 28. Washbrook was particularly confident and Bradman decided to not risk Johnson in the morning session.

The afternoon session continued with further spectator encroachments. After lunch, Bradman set defensive fields with the intent of restricting the scoring, and used his remaining bowlers in short spells to conserve their energy, expecting a long day in the field. The absence of Toshack also meant Loxton had a substantial workload with the ball. The English batsmen continued to accelerate, and when Bradman finally brought Johnson into the attack, they targeted him. Washbrook hit a straight six from Johnson, and Hutton followed suit to take England from 98 to 104. For the second time in the match, the English openers had put on a century stand, and the shot also brought up Hutton's 50 in 125 minutes. This feat made Hutton and Washbrook the first pair to make century opening partnerships in both innings of a Test on two occasions; they had done this for the first time against Australia in the Fourth Test at the Adelaide Oval in 1946–47. Bradman replaced Johnson with Lindwall immediately, and Washbrook responded by cutting the paceman for four to reach his half-century. Lindwall responded with two bouncers. Washbrook then hooked one a short ball from Johnston and got a top edge, but Bradman failed to take the catch.

Washbrook then attempted another hook from Johnston towards deep square leg. Connecting with the middle of the bat, he imparted much power on the ball, which flew flat and never went more than six metres above the ground. Harvey quickly moved in across the outfield from the square leg fence and bent over to catch the ball at his ankles while still on the run. Fingleton called it "the catch of the season—or, indeed, would have been had Harvey not turned on several magnificent aerial performances down at The Oval [in an earlier match against Surrey]". O'Reilly doubted "whether any other player on either side could have made the distance to get to the ball, let alone make a neat catch of it". He further said the "hook was a beauty and the catch was a classic".

Johnson then removed Hutton for 57 without further addition to the total, caught by Bradman on the run, leaving England at 129/2. The Yorkshire batsman went for a lofted shot and mistimed it high in the air after being beaten in flight, and the Australian captain ran backwards from mid-on to complete the catch. This meant the two new batsmen at the crease, Edrich and Compton, were still yet to score, and the second new ball was only six overs away, so they had to preserve their wickets while conditions were at their most favourable for Australia's fast bowlers. During a slow period in which only 15 runs came in half an hour, Edrich and Compton were pinned down by defensive field settings with no slips in place. After 45 minutes, Compton premeditated a charge down the pitch and hit Johnson to the leg side for a boundary. The pair accelerated, Compton taking risks in cutting Johnson against the spin. Australia took the new ball and each batsman hit a boundary to bring up the fifty partnership, which took an hour. Worried by the substantial and hazardous craters he and the other bowlers had created in the pitch while following through on the left-hand side of the crease, Lindwall changed to bowling from around the wicket and was warned by umpire Baldwin for running on the pitch, before reverting to over the wicket, although he delivered from the edge of the crease to avoid the holes. O'Reilly said Baldwin's warning to Lindwall had played into Australia's hands as the bowler's follow through from around the wicket was accentuating a rough patch outside the right-hander's off stump, which the English bowlers could target when Bradman's men had to chase the target. Compton then hit boundaries with hooks and pulls from Lindwall and Johnston and England went to tea at 209/2. Compton was on 42 and Edrich 33.

After the interval, Bradman continued with his strategy of rotating his bowlers in short spells, and set a defensive, well-spread field for Johnson's bowling. Edrich hit three consecutive boundaries from Johnson before lofting a fourth ball into the crowd for six. He then passed his half-century—his fourth consecutive Test score in excess of 50—before Lindwall trapped him lbw for 51 to leave England at 232/3, ending a third-wicket partnership of 103. Crapp came in and added 18 before he was bowled by Lindwall, inside edging an attempted forcing stroke through the off side from the back foot. This left England at 260/4, and precipitated a mini-collapse. Yardley deliberately lifted Lindwall over the vacant slips region and reached seven before he fell to Johnston, caught by a leaping Harvey while attempting a lofted shot. Johnston then had Cranston caught behind for a duck with only a further run added to leave England at 278/6, a lead of 316. Evans came in and edged his first ball through the slips at a catchable height for four. Compton drove Lindwall for a boundary but then fell to Johnston for 66, caught by Miller at cover. England were 293/7 with no recognised batsmen remaining, having lost 4/33. Wicket-keeper Evans was joined by Bedser, and the pair added 37 before Miller removed the latter. Laker came in and helped Evans to add a further 32 as England reached 362/8 at the close of the fourth day. Evans—mainly through boundaries—had helped England to add 69 runs in the last 45 minutes of play.

== 27 July: Day Five ==
England batted on for five minutes during the final morning, adding three runs in two overs before Yardley declared at 365/8, with Evans unbeaten on 47. Johnston had the pick of the bowling figures, with 4/95. Batting into the final day allowed Yardley to ask the groundsman to use a heavy roller at the start of the morning, which would help break up the wicket and make it more likely to spin. Bradman had done a similar thing during the previous Ashes series in Australia before setting England a target. The hosts needed to beat Australia to avoid a series defeat. Bradman elected to not have the pitch rolled at all, demonstrating his opinion that such a device would make the surface less favourable for batting.

The declaration left Australia with a victory target of 404 runs. At the time, this would have been the highest ever fourth innings score to result in a Test victory for the batting side. Australia had only 345 minutes to reach the target, and the local press wrote them off, predicting their dismissal by lunchtime on a deteriorating wicket expected to favour the spinners. In addition, most of the Australian onlookers present at the ground thought their team had no chance of victory. Morris and Hassett started slowly, making only six runs in the first six overs on a pitch offering spin and bounce. It appeared they were playing carefully at first before deciding whether to try to achieve the target at a later point. In Bedser's second over, the third of the innings, Morris chipped the ball in the air towards mid-wicket, in a similar manner to his first innings dismissal, but this time the ball evaded Cranston. After 15 minutes Australia had scored only 10 runs.

After Bedser had bowled three overs, Yardley introduced Laker in his place in the seventh over to exploit the spin. An attacking field, with two slips and a gully, was put in a place, but Laker bowled inaccurately and the Australian openers took 13 runs from his first over. Hassett hit a four and took a single to give Morris the strike. Morris hit a four, was beaten by a bouncing ball that hurried off the pitch and then hit another boundary. Despite this over, only 44 runs came in the first hour, meaning that 360 runs were needed in 285 minutes. After his poor first over, Laker had settled down and conceded only two runs from his next six overs. The frustrated crowd heckled the Australian openers for their slow scoring and Morris was ironically applauded after taking a single. Evans then missed a leg-side stumping opportunity against Hassett, and Bedser beat each of the Australians with extra bounce. During his early spell, Laker "was getting at least one ball every over to turn considerably".

Noting Laker's ability to extract substantial turn from the pitch, Yardley brought on the part-time left-arm unorthodox spin of Compton, who bowled inaccurately although with some turn. Morris struck two fours in Compton's first over to register Australia's 50 in 64 minutes. Compton's next over was more potent; he deceived Morris, who danced down the pitch and missed the ball, but Evans fumbled the stumping opportunity. At the time, Morris was on 32 and Australia at 55/0. Laker beat Morris in the next over with an off break that spun a foot, and in the succeeding over, Hassett was dismissed by Compton with the score at 57. Compton had caught Hassett's leading edge and dived forward in his follow through to catch the ball one-handed just above the ground.

Bradman joined Morris with 347 runs needed in 257 minutes. After receiving another rapturous welcome from the Headingley spectators in his last innings at the ground, the Australian captain signalled his intentions by hitting a boundary from Compton and another off the first ball he faced from Laker, cover driving against the spin. Bradman reached 12 in six minutes.

Yardley then called upon the occasional leg spin of Hutton in an attempt to exploit the turning wicket. The latter had taken only four wickets in the 1947 English season and had never dismissed an Australian batsman in ten Tests against such opponents. As Australia were still behind the required run rate, Yardley could afford to take risks and sacrifice some runs if he got wickets in return. Morris promptly joined Bradman in the counter-attack, hitting three consecutive fours from Hutton's first over, which Fingleton described as "rather terrible" due to the errant length. This over took Morris to 51. After an economical over from Compton, Bradman took two fours off Hutton's next over before almost holing out to Yardley. Despite the near miss, the 20 runs from Hutton's two inaccurate overs had allowed Australia to reach 96/1 from 90 minutes.

In the next over, Compton bowled a googly to deceive Bradman, who expected the ball to turn in. However, it went the other way, took the outside edge and ran away past slip for four. Bradman leg glanced the next ball for another boundary, before again failing to read a googly on the third ball of the over. This time the edge went to Crapp, who failed to hold on to the catch. The sixth ball of Compton's over beat Bradman and hit him on the pads. Compton had control of Bradman for the over, but went unrewarded. At the other end, Morris continued to plunder Hutton's inaccurate leg breaks, and Australia reached lunch at 121/1, with Morris on 63 and Bradman on 35. Hutton had conceded 30 runs in four overs, and in the half-hour preceding the interval, Australia had added 64 runs. Both Morris and Bradman had been given lives. Although Australia had scored at a reasonable rate, they had also been troubled by many of the deliveries and were expected to face further difficulty if they were to avoid defeat.

Upon resumption, Compton continued as Yardley attempted to exploit the turning wicket. However, Compton was not a regular bowler and he sent down a series of ill-directed full tosses and long hops that were easily dispatched for runs. Morris struck seven fours in two overs of what Fingleton called "indescribably bad bowling". This included six fours in eight balls. As Morris continued to attack, Compton began to crack under the pressure and his inaccuracy increased. The part-time bowler had generated trouble for the batsmen by tossing the ball up and beating the bat or inducing edges, but Morris counterattacked with drives. Compton tried to hold back his length to avoid being driven but the Australian opener pounced on the shorter balls. Morris reached the 90s just 14 minutes after the interval and hit another boundary to reach his century in a little over two hours. Morris had added 37 runs since lunch, mainly from Compton's wayward offerings, while Bradman had added only three.

The onslaught prompted Yardley to take the new ball and replace Compton with his pacemen. Bradman reached 50 in 60 minutes and then aimed a drive from Cranston's bowling, but sliced it in the air to point. Yardley dived forward and got his hands to the ball, but failed to hold on. Australia reached 202—halfway to the required total—with 165 minutes left, after Morris dispatched consecutive full tosses from Laker. England began to become demoralised and their fielding continued to deteriorate. Bradman hooked two boundaries, but suffered a fibrositis attack, which put him in significant pain. Drinks were taken while Bradman was being treated, and Morris had to shield his captain from the strike until the pain had subsided. Australia reached 250 shortly before tea with Morris on 133 and Bradman on 92. Bradman then reached his century in 147 minutes as the second-wicket stand passed 200.

Morris was given another life on 136 when Laker dropped him while fielding at square leg from Compton's bowling. Bradman was given another life at 108 when he advanced two metres down the pitch to Laker and missed, but Evans fumbled the stumping opportunity with the batsman far out of his ground. Australia reached tea at 292/1 with Morris on 150. The pair had added 171 during the session. Morris was eventually dismissed by Yardley for 182, after hitting a tired-looking shot to mid-off, having partnered Bradman in a stand of 301 in 217 minutes. He struck 33 fours in a 290-minute innings. This brought Miller to the crease with 46 runs still required. Miller struck two boundaries and helped take the score to 396 before falling lbw to Cranston with eight runs still needed. Harvey came in and got off the mark with a boundary that brought up the winning runs. Australia had won by seven wickets, setting a new world record for the highest successful Test runchase, with Bradman unbeaten on 173 in only 255 minutes of batting with 29 fours.

The attendance of 158,000 was the highest for any cricket match on English soil and the takings were 34,000 pounds. The crowd remains a record for a Test in England.

== Aftermath ==
After the Fourth Test, the Australians had five tour matches before the final Test. They defeated Derbyshire by an innings, before having a washout against Glamorgan. The Australians then defeated Warwickshire by nine wickets, before drawing with Lancashire, who hung on with three wickets in hand on the final day. This was followed by a two-day non-first-class match against Durham, which was drawn after rain washed out the second day. During this period, Barnes returned to action after recuperating from his rib injury. Toshack also recovered to play against Lancashire, but injured himself again and was ruled out of the remainder of the tour.

Following Australia's unlikely win at Headingley, the England selectors were widely condemned for their failure to choose a specialist wrist spinner to exploit the turning pitch. This was cited as a reason for the hosts' loss, as the part-timer Compton was able to trouble the batsmen and generate opportunities for wickets, only to see them foregone because of missed catches and stumpings. In response, the English selectors made four changes to the team for the Fifth Test, one of these being the inclusion of leg spinner Eric Hollies. Their frequent changes to the team meant the hosts used a total of 21 players for the five Tests, and the repeated changes to personnel resulted in heavy criticism.

Despite Hollies being able to trouble most of their batsmen, Australia completed the Test series with a convincing innings victory in the Fifth Test to complete a 4–0 result. The Fifth Test was the last international match, and Australia had only seven further matches to negotiate in order to fulfil Bradman's aim of going through the tour undefeated. They secured three consecutive innings victories against Kent, the Gentlemen of England and Somerset. They proceeded to take first innings leads of more than 200 against the South of England and Leveson-Gower's XI, but both matches were washed out. The last two matches were two-day non-first-class matches against Scotland, both won by an innings. Bradman's men thus completed the tour undefeated, earning themselves the sobriquet The Invincibles.

The runchase of 404 stood as a record until 1976. As of 2020, it is the fourth highest successful runchase (and the third highest successfully chased target) in Test cricket history.

== See also ==
- 1948 Ashes series
