= Bapoo Mama =

Cricket statistician

Bapoo Burjorji 'B.B.' Mama (April 8, 1924 in Bombay – March 18, 1995 in Bombay) was a cricket statistician.

Bapoo Mama was a major figure in Indian cricket statistics in the second half of the twentieth century. In the 1970s and eighties, he contributed columns like Follow 'em with BBM, Figures are Fun, Factfile and Down the Memory Lane to prominent periodicals like the Sportstar, Sportsweek, Times of India and Pakistan Cricket International. He was also a regular contributor to the Indian sections in the Wisden. He served as the official statistician of the national channel Doordarshan from 1973 to 1988.

Mama was educated in Bombay but moved to Panchgani in Maharashtra in 1948 for reasons of health. He lived most of the rest of his life there. He died following a short illness of intestinal and lung complications.

== See also ==
- Obituary in Indian Cricket 1996
