= International cricket in 1954–55 =

International cricket season

The 1954–55 international cricket season was from September 1954 to April 1955.

== Season overview ==
International tours
Start date	Home team	Away team	Results [Matches]			
Start date	Home team	Away team	Test	ODI	FC	LA
26 November 1954	Australia	England	1–3 [5]	—	—	—
3 December 1954	India	Pakistan	—	—	1–0 [1]	—
1 January 1955	Pakistan	India	0–0 [5]	—	—	—
11 March 1955	New Zealand	England	0–2 [2]	—	—	—
26 March 1955	West Indies	Australia	0–3 [5]	—	—	—

== November ==
=== England in Australia ===
The Ashes Test series
No.	Date	Home captain	Away captain	Venue	Result
Test 391	26 Nov–1 December	Ian Johnson	Leonard Hutton	The Gabba, Brisbane	Australia by an innings and 154 runs
Test 392	17–22 December	Arthur Morris	Leonard Hutton	Sydney Cricket Ground, Sydney	England by 38 runs
Test 393	31 Dec–5 January	Ian Johnson	Leonard Hutton	Melbourne Cricket Ground, Melbourne	England by 128 runs
Test 396	28 Jan–2 February	Ian Johnson	Leonard Hutton	Adelaide Oval, Adelaide	England by 5 wickets
Test 399	25 Feb–3 March	Ian Johnson	Leonard Hutton	Sydney Cricket Ground, Sydney	Match drawn

== December ==
=== Pakistan in India ===
First-class match
No.	Date	Home captain	Away captain	Venue	Result
Match	11–16 March	Not mentioned	Not mentioned	Brabourne Stadium, Bombay	Bombay Cricket Association by an innings and 125 runs

== January ==
=== India in Pakistan ===
Test series
No.	Date	Home captain	Away captain	Venue	Result
Test 394	1–4 January	Abdul Kardar	Vinoo Mankad	Bangabandhu National Stadium, Dhaka	Match drawn
Test 395	15–18 January	Abdul Kardar	Vinoo Mankad	Bahawal Stadium, Bahawalpur	Match drawn
Test 397	29 Jan–1 February	Abdul Kardar	Vinoo Mankad	Bagh-e-Jinnah, Lahore	Match drawn
Test 398	13–16 February	Abdul Kardar	Vinoo Mankad	Services Ground, Peshawar	Match drawn
Test 400	26 Feb–1 March	Abdul Kardar	Vinoo Mankad	National Stadium, Karachi	Match drawn

== March ==
=== England in New Zealand ===
Test series
No.	Date	Home captain	Away captain	Venue	Result
Test 401	11–16 March	Geoff Rabone	Leonard Hutton	Carisbrook, Dunedin	England by 8 wickets
Test 402	25–28 March	Geoff Rabone	Leonard Hutton	Eden Park, Auckland	England by an innings and 20 runs

=== Australia in the West Indies ===
Test Series
No.	Date	Home captain	Away captain	Venue	Result
Test 403	26–31 March	Denis Atkinson	Ian Johnson	Sabina Park, Kingston	Australia by 9 wickets
Test 404	11–16 April	Jeffrey Stollmeyer	Ian Johnson	Queen's Park Oval, Port of Spain	Match drawn
Test 405	26–29 April	Jeffrey Stollmeyer	Ian Johnson	Bourda, Georgetown	Australia by 8 wickets
Test 406	14–20 May	Denis Atkinson	Ian Johnson	Kensington Oval, Bridgetown	Match drawn
Test 408	11–17 June	Denis Atkinson	Ian Johnson	Sabina Park, Kingston	Australia by an innings and 82 runs
