= Indian cricket =

Indian Cricket may refer to one of the following:

- Cricket in India
- Indian cricket team
- Indian Cricket (annual)
- Board of Control for Cricket in India, the board which governs cricketing in India.
