= International cricket in 1956 =

International cricket season

The 1956 international cricket season was from April 1956 to August 1956.

== Season overview ==
International tours
Start date	Home team	Away team	Results [Matches]			
Start date	Home team	Away team	Test	ODI	FC	LA
7 June 1956	England	Australia	2–1 [5]	—	—	—
28 July 1956	Denmark	Netherlands	—	—	0–0 [1]	—
18 August 1956	Netherlands	England	—	—	0–0 [1]	—

== June ==
=== Australia in England ===
The Ashes Test series
No.	Date	Home captain	Away captain	Venue	Result
Test 425	7–12 June	Peter May	Ian Johnson	Trent Bridge, Nottingham	Match drawn
Test 426	21–26 June	Peter May	Ian Johnson	Lord's, London	Australia by 185 runs
Test 427	12–17 July	Peter May	Ian Johnson	Headingley Cricket Ground, Leeds	England by an innings and 42 runs
Test 428	26–31 July	Peter May	Ian Johnson	Old Trafford Cricket Ground, Manchester	England by an innings and 170 runs
Test 429	23–28 August	Peter May	Ian Johnson	Kennington Oval, London	Match drawn

== July ==
=== Netherlands in Denmark ===
Two-day Match
No.	Date	Home captain	Away captain	Venue	Result
Match	28–29 July	J Finnich	Wally van Weelde	Hjørring	Match drawn

== August ==
=== England in Netherlands ===
Two-day Match
No.	Date	Home captain	Away captain	Venue	Result
Match	18–19 August	Not mentioned	Not mentioned	Not mentioned	Match drawn
