= William Johnson (cricketer, born 1884) =

Australian cricketer and grocer

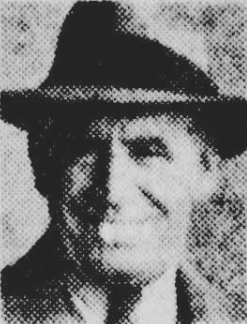
W. J. Johnson

William James Johnson (22 September 1884 – 14 August 1941) was a wine and spirit grocer and keen cricketer who played one first-class match for Victoria in 1924–25. He was later a selector of the Australian Test team.

Johnson's son, Ian, went on to captain the Australian Test cricket team.
