= Ian Johnson (cricketer) =

Australian cricketer (1917–1998)

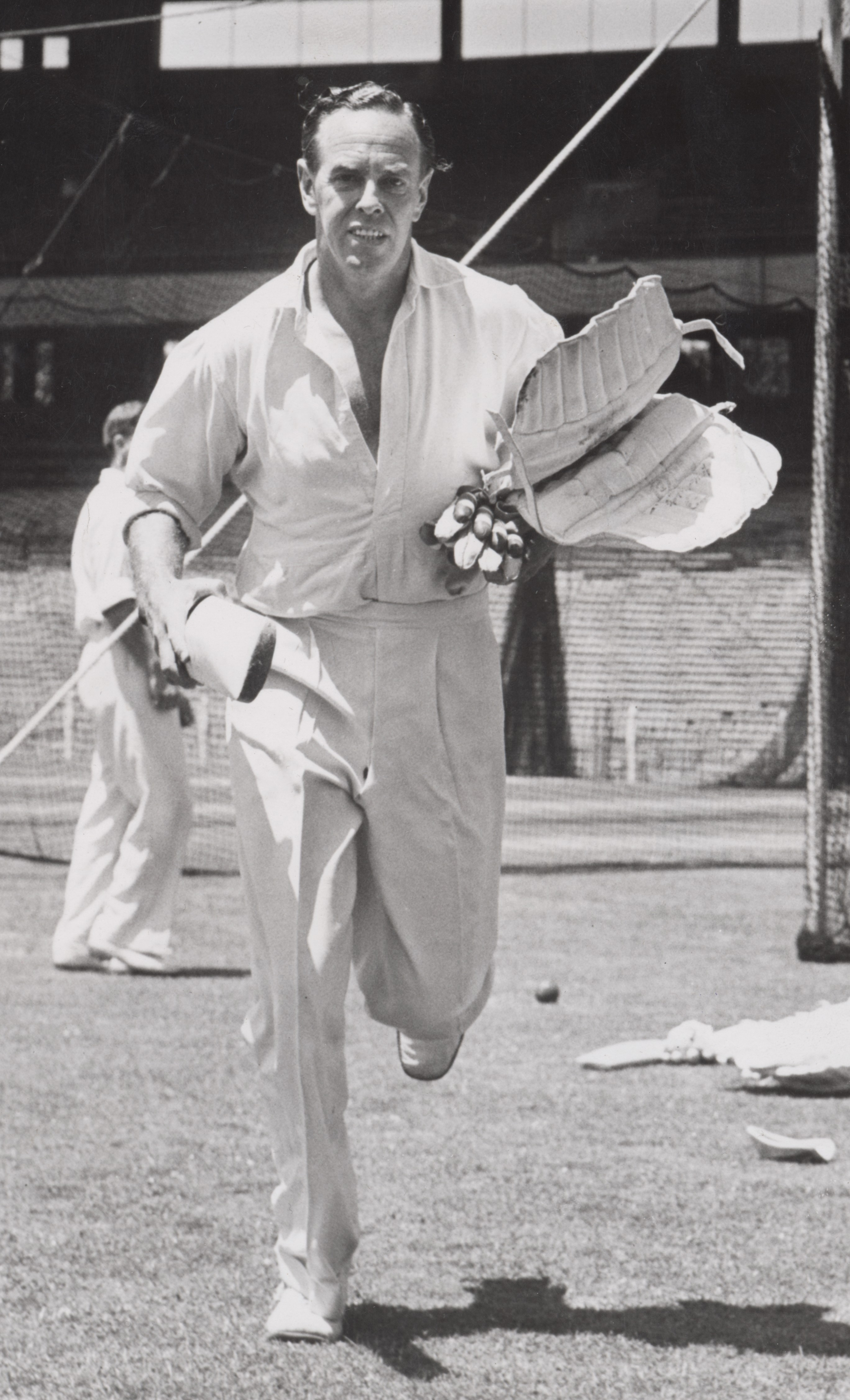
- Johnson in about 1946

Personal information
- Full name: Ian William Geddes Johnson
- Born: 8 December 1917; North Melbourne, Victoria, Australia
- Died: 9 October 1998 (aged 80); Albert Park, Victoria, Australia
- Height: 177 cm (5 ft 10 in)
- Batting: Right-handed
- Bowling: Right-arm off-spin
- Role: All rounder

International information
- National side: Australia
- Test debut (cap 164): 29 March 1946 v New Zealand
- Last Test: 2 November 1956 v India

Domestic team information
- Years: Team
- 1935/36–1955/56: Victoria

Career statistics
Competition	Test	First-class
Matches	45	189
Runs scored	1,000	4,905
Batting average	18.51	22.92
100s/50s	0/6	2/21
Top score	77	132*
Balls bowled	8,780	35,968
Wickets	109	619
Bowling average	29.19	22.92
5 wickets in innings	3	27
10 wickets in match	0	4
Best bowling	7/44	7/42
Catches/stumpings	30/0	137/0
- Source: ESPNcricinfo, 26 February 2008

Ian William Geddes Johnson, CBE (8 December 1917 – 9 October 1998) was an Australian cricketer who played 45 Test matches as a slow off-break bowler between 1946 and 1956. Johnson captured 109 Test wickets at an average of 29.19 runs per wicket and as a capable lower order batsman made 1,000 runs at an average of 18.51 runs per dismissal. He captained the Australian team in 17 Tests, winning seven and losing five, with a further five drawn. Despite this record, he is better known as the captain who lost consecutive Ashes series against England. Urbane, well-spoken and popular with his opponents and the public, he was seen by his teammates as a disciplinarian and his natural optimism was often seen as naive.

Aged 17, Johnson made his first-class cricket debut for Victoria in the 1935–36 season but did not establish a permanent place in the team until 1939–40. His career was interrupted by the Second World War; he served with the Royal Australian Air Force as a pilot and later as a flight instructor. He returned to cricket after his discharge and was selected to tour New Zealand with the Australian team, making his Test debut. Johnson was part of Don Bradman's Invincibles team; undefeated on tour in England in 1948. He was a regular member of the national team until poor form saw him left out of the Australian squad for the 1953 tour of England.

Johnson was appointed Australian captain following Lindsay Hassett's retirement. The appointment was not universally popular; some teammates and supporters felt Keith Miller had a better claim to the position. In his first series as captain, Australia was defeated by a strong English team on home soil. The tour of the West Indies that followed was a cricketing and diplomatic triumph for Johnson. Australia won the Test series comfortably and Johnson's astute public relations skills helped avoid a repeat of the crowd disturbances that had marred England's visit to the islands 12 months before. However, his Australian team then went on to lose the 1956 Ashes series in England. Johnson's Test career ended with Australia's first Test tour of the Indian subcontinent, which occurred during the voyage back to Australia. Australia lost the one-off Test against Pakistan, the first between the two nations, before claiming the series against India. On his return to Australia, he retired from all forms of cricket at age 39.

After retirement, Johnson worked for a time as a sports commentator, including covering the 1956 Summer Olympics in Melbourne. In 1957 he was appointed Secretary of the Melbourne Cricket Club, one of the most prestigious positions in Australian sport. He would remain in the role for 26 years, overseeing the development of the Melbourne Cricket Ground and playing a key role in the organisation of the Centenary Test in 1977. In 1956 he was appointed Member of the Order of the British Empire for services to cricket; this was twice upgraded: to OBE in 1977 and to CBE in 1982.

== Early years ==
Johnson was born in North Melbourne, an inner suburb of Melbourne, on 8 December 1917. His father, William Johnson—a wine and spirit grocer—was a keen cricketer who played one first-class match for Victoria in 1924–25 before serving as a selector for the Australian Test team.

As a schoolboy, Ian Johnson excelled at a variety of sports. He participated in athletics and Australian rules football, as well as playing as a wicket-keeper for Middle Park State School. In 1936, he became the Victorian amateur squash champion. However, he found his vocation in cricket. In 1934–35, aged only 16, and still a schoolboy at Wesley College, Johnson played his first match for the South Melbourne Cricket Club First XI.

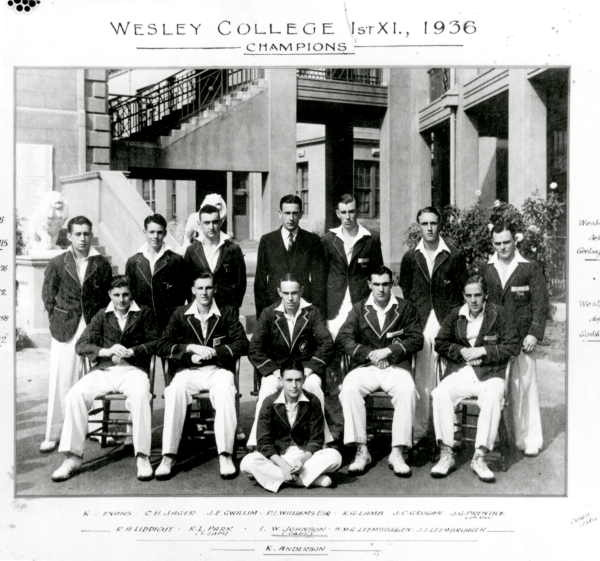
The Wesley College First XI in 1936. Johnson is in the middle row, centre.

He was given the opportunity to play first-class cricket the following season, playing Tasmania—not then involved in the Sheffield Shield competition—just 23 days past his seventeenth birthday. He scored 34 and 26 and took two wickets in each innings as Tasmania won by six wickets. He was retained for the next game, scoring 15 runs in his only innings and taking 3 wickets for 40 runs (3/40) in the Tasmanian first innings and 1/27 in the second.

He did not play first-class cricket again for three years, finally returning to the Victorian team to play another two games against Tasmania in 1938–39, making his highest first-class score to date, 88 runs, in the second game. He secured his place in the Victorian team in the 1939–40 season, making his Sheffield Shield debut against South Australia in Adelaide in November 1939. Batting at number five, Johnson scored 33 runs in the first innings and 41 in the second, but was unable to take a wicket. That season, Johnson scored 313 runs at an average of 26.08 and took 13 wickets at an average of 39.92. In a season truncated because of the Second World War, Johnson played five matches in 1940–41, scoring 292 runs at an average of 32.44 and taking 25 wickets at 27.60.

Johnson's cricket career was interrupted by the war and he enlisted in the Royal Australian Air Force (RAAF) in March 1941. He flew Bristol Beaufighters with No. 22 Squadron RAAF and, by 1944, was serving as a Flight Lieutenant in the South West Pacific theatre. In June 1945, Johnson was awarded the King's Commendation for Valuable Service in the Air for his work as a flight instructor with No. 11 Elementary Flying Training School, based at Benalla in rural Victoria. He was discharged in December 1945 and resumed his first-class cricket career in the 1945–46 season.

== Test career ==
=== Debut and early Test career ===
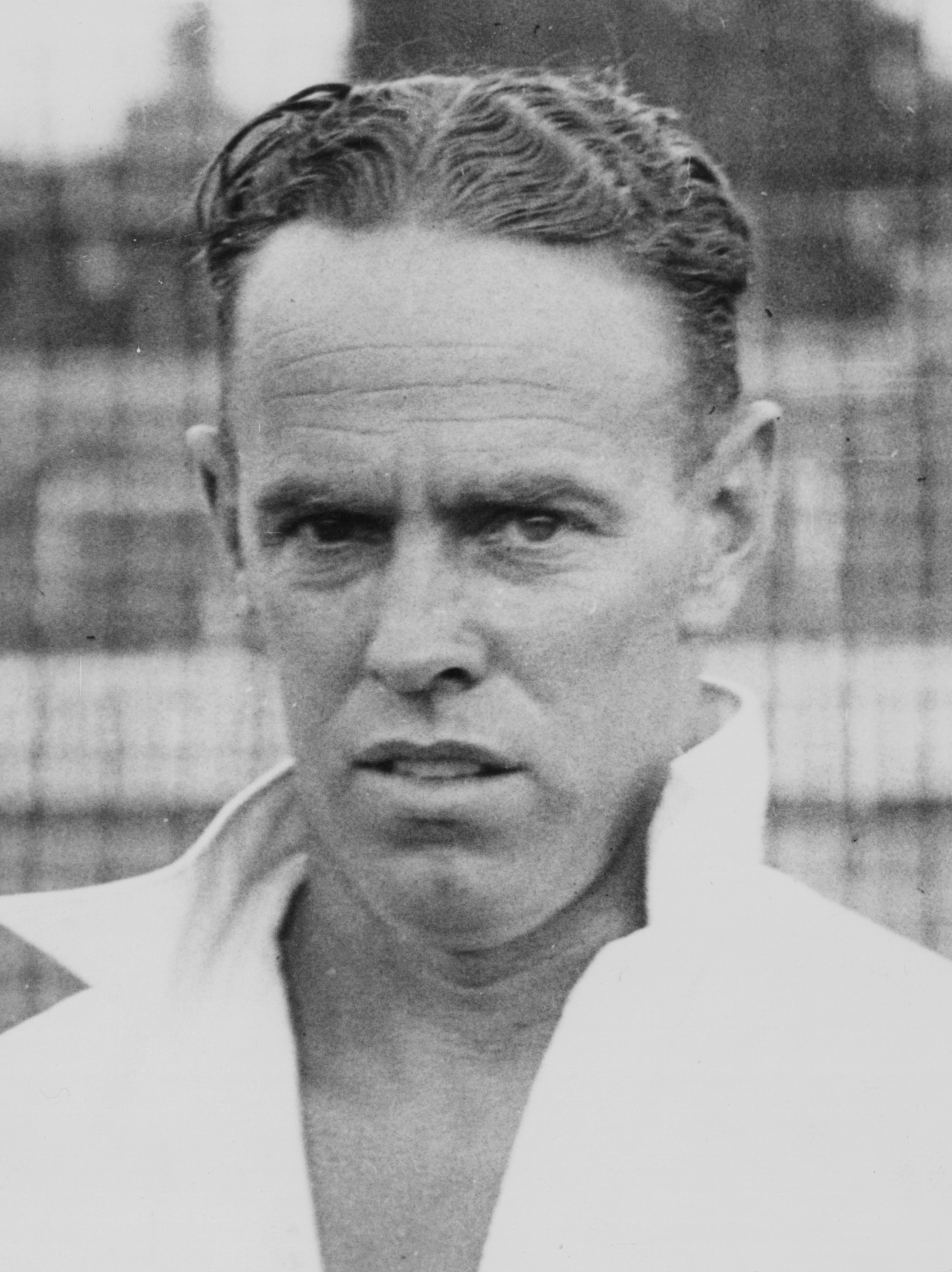
Johnson c. 1945

Following his discharge from service, Johnson returned to first-class cricket in the 1945–46 season, winning a place on the Australian tour of New Zealand. The only Test match—the first between the two nations—was played at the Basin Reserve in Wellington. Johnson scored 7 not out and he was not needed to bowl as New Zealand collapsed for an aggregate of just 96 runs in their two innings; Australia won by an innings and 103 runs.

Test cricket resumed in Australia with the visit of the English team in 1946–47. Before the Test matches started, the touring team played Victoria in a warm-up match. Johnson took 4 wickets for 38 runs in the English second innings but was unable to prevent the tourists from winning by 244 runs. He was included in the Australian team for the First Test at Brisbane, scoring 47 runs in the Australian total of 645. Once again Johnson was not given an opportunity to bowl as Australia won the match by an innings and 332 runs. Johnson took his first Test wicket with only his third delivery in Test cricket, dismissing Len Hutton caught behind down the leg side in the Second Test in Sydney. Making use of the breeze, in one 11 over stretch Johnson conceded only three runs—including eight maidens, taking one wicket. Johnson went on to take 6 wickets for 42 runs in the innings as England were bowled out for 255. Johnson, batting as a nightwatchman, joined Sid Barnes at the wicket late on the second day of the match, batting through until stumps. He was dismissed the next day having scored 7 runs in an Australian total of 659. In the English second innings Johnson took another two wickets; England were dismissed for 371 runs and lost the Test by an innings and 33 runs.

Johnson met with less success in the Third Test in his home town of Melbourne. Batting at number six, Johnson was dismissed by Norman Yardley for a golden duck and, in the second innings, run out, again without scoring, giving him an unwanted pair. With the ball, Johnson took one wicket in the English first innings. In the second innings Australia were not able to dismiss England and the match was drawn; Johnson failed to take a wicket. Johnson returned to form with the bat in the Fourth Test at Adelaide. Unable to take a wicket in England's first innings, during the Australian first innings he made 52 runs. He dismissed Hutton again in the second innings, his only wicket of the match. The match finished in a draw, giving the Australians an unbeatable two–nil lead in the Test series and therefore retaining The Ashes. Johnson was injured and could not play in the Fifth and final Fifth Test in Sydney.

A weak Indian team toured Australia for the first time in 1947–48, to play five Tests against an Australian team led by Don Bradman. The Indian team was weakened by withdrawals of their first-choice captain Vijay Merchant, as well as Rusi Modi and Mushtaq Ali. Furthermore, Fazal Mahmood had become a Pakistani, following the partition of India. Johnson played in the first four Tests, taking 16 wickets at an average of 16.31 runs per wicket. The Third Test at the Melbourne Cricket Ground (MCG) saw Johnson's best performance of the series, 4/59 in the first innings and 4/35 in the second. Australia won the series 4–0.

=== Bradman's Invincibles ===
Johnson was a member of Don Bradman's Australian team touring England in 1948. Known as the Invincibles, the Australian team was the first team to remain unbeaten through an entire English tour. Johnson started the tour well, taking 7/42 in an early tour match against Leicestershire, followed by 5/53 against Surrey. Against Essex, Johnson took 6/37 in the second innings. Earlier in the match Australia had scored 721 runs in a single day; Johnson made 9.

Having earned selection for the First Test at Trent Bridge, Johnson took only one wicket in the match; Australia won the Test by eight wickets. He had more success in the Second Test at Lord's taking three wickets in the first innings as Australia won the match by 409 runs. Johnson failed to take a wicket in a rain-affected Third Test at Old Trafford, and was replaced after the Fourth Test, having taken only seven wickets in the series at an average of 61.00. Wisden Cricketers' Almanack noted that while Johnson had started the tour well, he was not as effective in English conditions as Australian.

[Johnson] was not so troublesome to batsmen in Tests as when at home, principally because of the difference in pace of the pitches and his inability to bowl round the wicket, an almost essential part in the make-up of an off-spinner in England. False expectation against Johnson in Australia usually cost a batsman his wicket, but on slower English pitches there was time to change a stroke and still keep the ball out of the stumps, even though beaten by flight.

— Wisden Cricketers' Almanack, 1949

Nonetheless, Johnson played an important role in maintaining the Australian team's unbeaten record, bowling more overs than anyone other than Bill Johnston—allowing Bradman to rest Keith Miller and Ray Lindwall, his fast bowling pair, for the important matches.

=== Decline in form ===
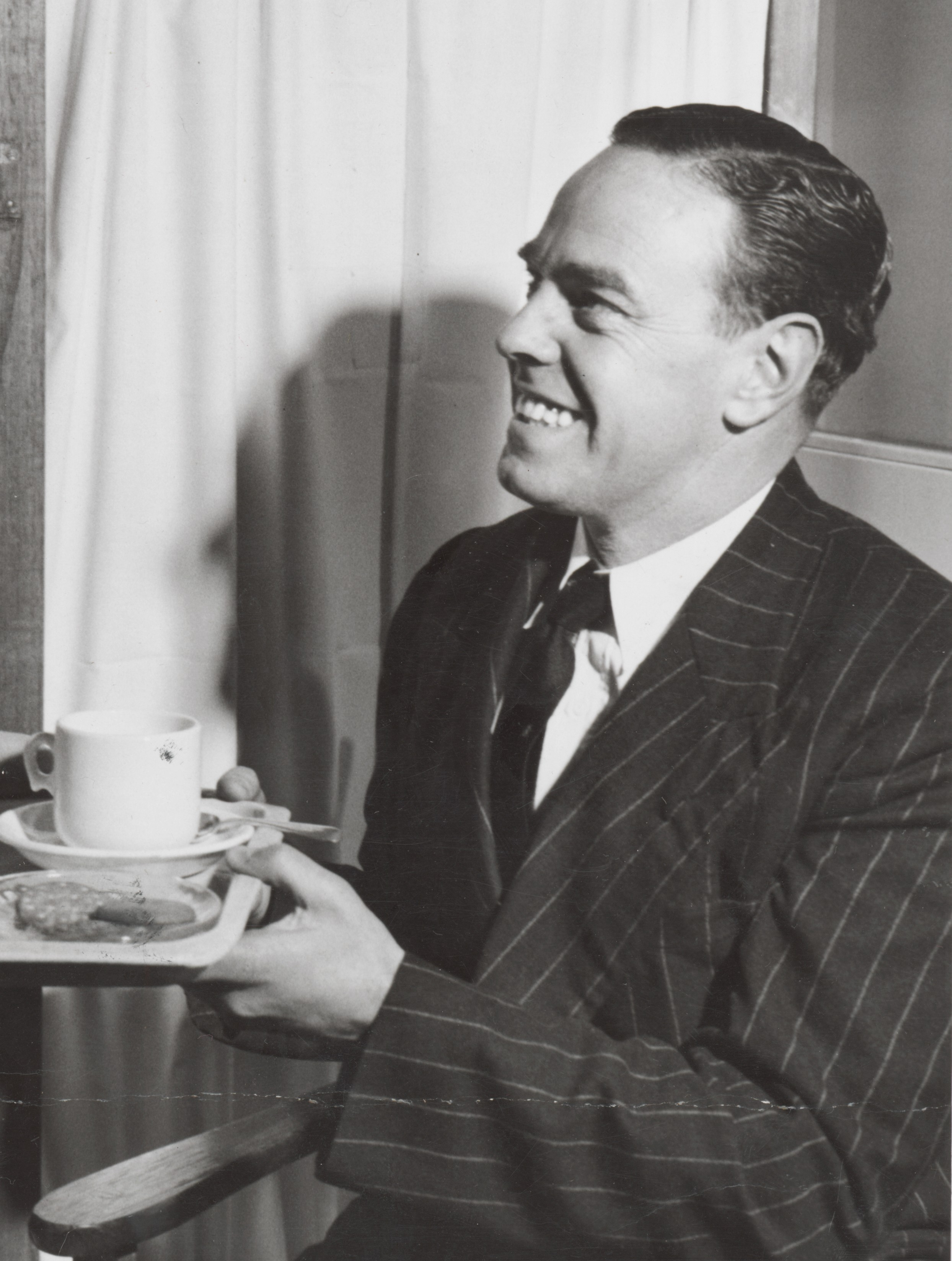
Johnson in 1950

During the Test series in South Africa in 1949–50, Johnson took 18 wickets at an average of 24.22—only Bill Johnston, with 23, took more. Against a South African team weakened following the Second World War, the Australians started the series with a win in the First Test at Ellis Park at Johannesburg. The Australians won the match by an innings and 83 runs; Johnson made 66 and took 3/37 and 3/54. His best performance was in the Third Test at Kingsmead in Durban; 5/34 including the wicket of Dudley Nourse as South Africa was dismissed for 99. Australia, having made only 75 in their first innings, scored 336, including 151 not out by Neil Harvey, to win the match by five wickets. Australia won the series—Lindsay Hassett's first as captain—four Tests to nil.

Freddie Brown and his English team toured Australia in 1950–51 to compete for the Ashes in a five Test series. Australia won the series four Tests to one; however Wisden reports that while "Australia held a slight superiority ... the difference between the teams was markedly less than revealed by statistics". Johnson had a "mediocre series", taking only seven wickets at an average of 44.42. His best performance was in the Third Test, when he took three wickets in the England first innings. He followed this by scoring 77 runs in a 150 run partnership with Keith Miller, who went on to score 145 not out. Johnson took another wicket in the English second innings and Australia won the Test by an innings and 13 runs. England's victory in the Fifth Test in Melbourne ended Australia's unbeaten run of 29 Tests since 1938.

The next summer, the West Indian team visited Australia to play five Tests. The series was billed as the "unofficial cricket championship of the world", following the West Indian victory against England in 1950. However, the Australians won the series comfortably, 4–1. Johnson had another lean series, taking only eight wickets at an average of 32.75.

When the South Africans toured in 1952–53, Johnson was selected for Australia ahead of Queenslander Colin McCool. His selection was unpopular with a parochial Gabba crowd; when Gil Langley—who had replaced another Queenslander, Don Tallon—fumbled a stumping chance against John Watkins, they cheered loudly. Johnson was omitted from the team for the remainder of the series and was not included in the Australian squad to tour England in 1953.

== Captaincy ==
=== Selection ===
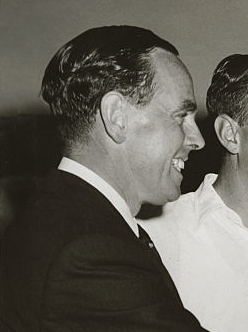
Johnson in 1954

While the Australian team lost the Ashes for the first time in twenty years, Johnson spent the winter of 1953 calling Australian rules football matches for local radio station 3AW and writing columns for The Argus newspaper. Later that year, the Victorian Cricket Association appointed him to succeed the retired Hassett as captain of Victoria. In the middle of the season, at a mutual friend's New Year's Eve party, Hassett approached Johnson to discuss his form. Taking a confrontational approach, Hassett said to Johnson, "The problem is that you are not getting stuck in. You're not trying." When Johnson protested, Hassett continued "If you have got any brains, you will start taking this game seriously. Because if you do you will end up captaining Australia next year."

The other contender for the vacant national captaincy position was Keith Miller, the fast-bowling all-rounder and captain of New South Wales. Miller had led his team to victory in the 1953–54 Sheffield Shield and was recognised as an intuitive captain. Based solely on cricketing merit, Miller, a regular selection at international level, was seen as the superior candidate. However, inter-state rivalries and a perception that Miller would be a poor disciplinarian saw him passed over. This perception was partly based on an incident when Miller, as captain of New South Wales, allowed his teammate Sid Barnes to serve drinks on the field dressed in a three-piece suit rather than standard cricket whites. Johnson, on the other hand, was part of the cricket establishment: he was an alumnus of the exclusive Wesley College and the son of a former Test selector. He had also returned to form, taking 37 wickets in the 1953–54 Sheffield Shield—more than any other player—at an average of 16.37. In what cricket writer Dick Whitington speculated was a vote split between the New South Wales and Victorian factions, the Australian Board of Control appointed Johnson as Australian captain. His appointment was not universally applauded.

There is strong feeling amongst cricket enthusiasts that horse trading on a state basis rather than objective evaluation of cricket skills has dominated selectors' discussions. The operating principle seems to have been "you look after my man and we'll look after yours."

— The Daily Telegraph editorial

=== Ashes defeat ===
Johnson's first challenge as captain was the Ashes series against England in 1954–55. In his first match as captain—the First Test at the Gabba in Brisbane—he led his team to victory, defeating England by an innings and 154 runs. It was to be the only Australian victory in the series. Injured, Johnson was unable to play in the Second Test in Sydney. With Miller also injured, Arthur Morris was asked to lead the Australian team against an English fast bowling attack including Frank Tyson and Brian Statham. Tyson, who took ten wickets in the match, was instrumental in England winning the Test by 38 runs. Johnson and Miller returned for the Third Test in Melbourne but were unable to prevent another English victory, this time by 128 runs. The Test was marred by controversy; Melbourne newspaper, The Age, alleged that the pitch had been watered during the course of the match, in contravention of the laws of cricket. Following an enquiry, the Victorian Cricket Association and the Melbourne Cricket Club issued a statement denying any watering of the playing area during the match; however Wisden reported that "large cracks were evident on Saturday yet on Monday these had closed and for a time the surface behaved more kindly to batsmen". Certainly, Johnson felt the pitch had been changed to his disadvantage: "It was like losing the toss twice over". Johnson and Test debutant Len Maddocks shared a partnership of 54 runs to help Australia fight back in their first innings. Tyson ended the Australian resistance, taking 7/27 in the Australian second innings—England won the match by 128 runs. England won the Fourth Test at Adelaide by five wickets and therefore retained the Ashes. With the Fifth and final Test ending in a draw, England won the series 3–1.

Wisden attributed England's victory to "superb fast bowling by Tyson and Statham [that] turned the scales so that finally the Australian batsmen were completely humbled". Losing three successive Tests saw the selectors of the Australian team subjected to harsh criticism. In the four Tests that Johnson played, he claimed 12 wickets at 20.25 and had a batting average of 58.00—inflated because of a series of not out innings; his highest score for the series was 41.

=== Caribbean success ===
In March 1955, Johnson led Australia's first Test tour of the West Indies. The Australian Board of Control was concerned about the team's relations with the West Indian public. Against a background of rising anti-colonial feeling and resentment, England's tour of the West Indies the year before had been marred by riots and violent disturbances. With the White Australia policy in place at the time, the Australians feared an unpleasant reception from the Caribbean public. However, the Australian team proved very popular throughout the West Indies; Wisden reported that "much credit belonged to the tact displayed by Ian Johnson, who proved a most able captain". Johnson cultivated a relaxed manner with the locals; in one instance at Sabina Park in Jamaica, he stopped to pick up a toddler who had run onto the playing field during the change of innings. Smiling and chatting to the boy, he then carried him safely off the ground. Teammate Alan Davidson claimed, "Ian did the best PR job of any captain I've ever seen".

As well as being popular, the Australian team was successful on the field, winning the series three Tests to nil. The series was dominated by batsmen; in the five Test matches played the Australians scored 12 centuries while for the West Indies, Clyde Walcott alone scored five centuries—including centuries in both innings in the Tests at Sabina Park and Queens Park Oval. Johnson injured his foot while batting during the Sabina Park Test and was unable to bowl or field for the remainder of the match. In his place, Miller led the Australians to a nine-wicket victory. The Second Test at Queens Park Oval was a high scoring draw; Johnson scored 66 runs and took a single wicket. Johnson met with success in the Third Test at Bourda in Georgetown, Guyana. He took 7/44 in the West Indian second innings—still the best-ever innings analysis by an Australian captain—and Australia won the Test by eight wickets.

A major rift between Johnson and Miller—erstwhile rivals for the Australian captaincy—developed during the Fourth Test, played at Kensington Oval in Barbados. During the third day, Miller, bowling fast-medium swingers, had dismissed Everton Weekes and Collie Smith in quick succession to leave the West Indies at 6/147 with Denis Atkinson and Clairmonte Depeiaza batting. Johnson, thinking that the two batsmen would be vulnerable to express pace, asked Miller to increase his bowling speed. When Miller refused, Johnson remonstrated with him: "I'll say who bowls and what they bowl". With Miller refusing to bowl as directed, Johnson replaced him in the attack with Ray Lindwall. Walking off the field at the end of the day's play and continuing in the dressing room, Miller provoked Johnson, telling him he "couldn't captain a team of schoolboys", among other insults. Finally Johnson responded, asking "If you want to go on like that why don't we go around the back and thrash it out?" The much larger Miller declined the offer and the pair travelled back to the team hotel together. The next day, Atkinson and Depeiaza batted throughout the entire day's play. Their partnership of 347 runs for the seventh wicket is still a world record.

In the Fifth and final Test, the Australians scored 758 runs in their only innings—including maiden Test centuries for Benaud and Ron Archer, centuries for Miller and Colin McDonald, and a double century for Neil Harvey—to win the match by an innings and 83 runs.

Overall, despite the team's victory in the series, Johnson's on-field contribution was inconsistent. While he took 14 wickets in the Test series, seven came in just one innings. His inconsistent form saw internal team tensions develop over whether his place in the team was justified; Wisden claimed that "some malcontents called him 'myxomatosis' because he only bowled when the rabbits were in".

Ian was starting to wane as a player. He was always confident in his own ability but things were getting hard for him. And I do think players need to realise when they are playing that one season too many.

— Alan Davidson

Donald Bradman wrote to Prime Minister Robert Menzies after the tour, recommending an honour for Johnson in recognition of his contribution to the tour's success. The next year, both Johnson and Miller were appointed as Member of the Order of the British Empire (MBE).

=== "Lakered" ===
Johnson led his Australian team to England in 1956. The team's visit to England coincided with what was described by Wisden as "the wettest of all summers in memory". The poor weather gave the Australian team little chance to develop their confidence and Johnson used the early matches of the tour to allow his batsmen and bowlers to experiment in the unfamiliar conditions. In one of these early matches, Surrey defeated Australia by ten wickets; the first time Australia had lost to county opposition since 1912. In parallel with later events in the Old Trafford Test, off-spinner Jim Laker took all ten wickets in the Australian first innings; Laker and left-arm spinner Tony Lock took 19 of the 20 Australian wickets that fell in the match. While Johnson was successful with the ball, taking 6 wickets for 168; his preconceived tactics saw him allow Lindwall—his main fast bowler—only two overs in Surrey's first innings and attempt to turn Alan Davidson into a spin bowler. Cricket writer Ray Robinson said of Johnson's tactics throughout the tour, "I have not met one good cricketer or cricket judge who is not mystified by them". The manner of this loss severely dented Australia's confidence against spin for the remainder of the tour.

The First Test, at Nottingham, was affected by rain and, despite England declaring twice, the match ended in a draw. Injuries to Lindwall and Davidson meant an under-strength Australian team was forced to take the field in the Second Test at Lord's. In what Wisden described as a "triumph of teamwork", the Australians won the match by 185 runs. Johnson was unlucky to lose the toss in the Third Test at Leeds, because Lock and Laker were able to take maximum advantage of a pitch conducive to spin. The duo took 18 of the 20 Australian wickets and England won the match by an innings and 42 runs.

The Fourth Test at Manchester proved controversial. The Old Trafford pitch had little grass, perhaps as a result of earlier wet weather. Again, Johnson lost the toss and England chose to bat first. Johnson and his spinning partner, Richie Benaud were unable to exploit the spin-friendly conditions and the English made 459 runs. In reply, the Australians could not come to grips with the conditions; Laker took nine of the ten wickets, Lock the other, as Australia were brushed away for just 84. Amid wild weather, the Australians were asked to follow-on. A determined batting performance was not enough to prevent an English victory by an innings and 170 runs. Laker's performance was historic. He took 10/53, the first time in a Test match a bowler had taken all ten wickets in an innings. With his 9/37 in the first innings, he had captured 19 wickets for the match, still a world record in first-class cricket. Wisden reported that the Australians were "extremely bitter over the condition of the pitch". Former Test cricketer and journalist Bill O'Reilly wrote "This pitch is a complete disgrace" while Colin McDonald later said, "England cheated: if by cheating you include the practise of preparing wickets to suit your own purpose." Johnson was generous towards the victors. Playing down the discontent felt by the Australians, he said: "When the controversy and side issues of the match are forgotten, Laker's wonderful bowling will remain." The media reported that Australia had been "Lakered".

The Fifth and final Test was drawn and Australia lost the series two Tests to one. Australia had now lost three Ashes series in a row, the last two with Johnson as captain. His own form was modest; he took only six wickets in the Tests at an average of over 50 runs per wicket. His performance with the bat was worse, scoring just 61 runs at an average of only 7.62. Once again, Johnson's place in the team was questioned. Acerbic cricket pundit Sid Barnes—a former teammate—joked that Johnson was "Australia's non-playing captain". Bill Ferguson, the Australian team's scorer, was also critical: "Had Johnson been told by his friends in the press that he was, in fact, a passenger, he might have pondered on the advisability of standing down. [...] There would have been no shame in standing down." Writing after the tour, Miller—a tour selector—stated "Privately I thought that [Johnson] was not a form selection. On the other hand, I did not think it wise to change skippers in midstream."

I was over the hill, no doubt about it. So were [Miller] and [Lindwall]. But even though I wasn't performing well, I still thought I was important to the side.

— Ian Johnson

=== Home and retirement ===
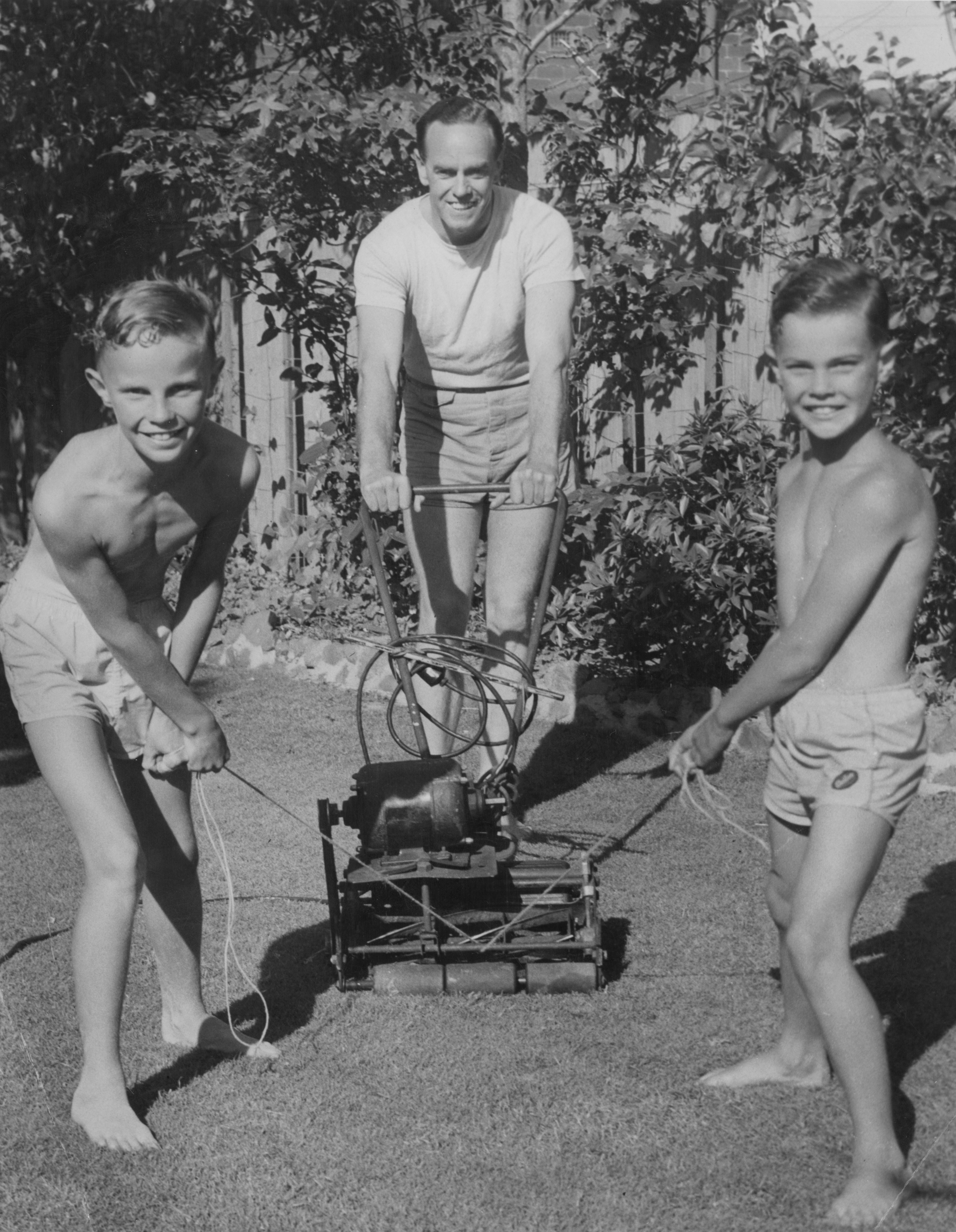
Johnson with sons in 1954

On the return journey from England, the Australians toured India and Pakistan for the first time, with mixed results. On a matting pitch, unfamiliar to the Australians, Johnson's team lost the inaugural Test against Pakistan at Karachi. Responding to the loss, a cartoon drawn by Norman Mitchell of the Adelaide News newspaper suggested island planters might be able to scrape together a team that would be a match for the Australians. Returning to turf pitches in India, the Australians restored some pride. Johnson was the highest scorer in the Australian team's victory by an innings and five runs in the First Test at Nehru Stadium in Madras. Due to injury, both Johnson and Miller missed the drawn Second Test at Brabourne Stadium at Bombay; Lindwall skippered the team. Johnson returned for the Third Test at Eden Gardens, Calcutta for what would ultimately prove to be his final Test. The Australians won the match by 94 runs, giving them a 2–0 series win. S. K. Gurunathan, summing up in the Indian Cricket Almanack, wrote: "The Australians showed themselves to be a superior side even when their batting failed".

When the team finally arrived home, Johnson announced his retirement from all cricket at the age of 39. In all, he played 45 Tests, capturing 109 wickets at an average of 29.19, including three five-wicket hauls. He scored exactly 1,000 runs, making him one of only fourteen Australians to achieve the double of 1,000 runs and 100 wickets in Test cricket. In all first-class cricket, Johnson had taken 619 wickets and scored 4,905 runs.

His record as the Australian captain was mixed; he had captained Australia in 17 Tests, winning seven and losing five. However, he was better known as the first captain to lead Australia to successive Ashes defeats in the 20th century. Reviewing Johnson's time as captain, Wisden said, "Unfortunately for him, he took over in the mid-1950s, when Australian cricket was decidedly inferior to England's for the first time since before the Bradman era" but "he was a fine cricketer and, in some respects, a visionary".

== Personal life ==
In 1942, aged 24, Johnson married 19-year-old Lal Park, the daughter of former Test cricketer Roy Park. They were married for 56 years and had two sons, Bill and Bob. After the war, when cricket commitments allowed, Johnson worked as a salesman. Immediately following his retirement, Johnson spent some time as one of the first television sporting commentators in Australia, covering the 1956 Summer Olympics, held in his home town of Melbourne. He wrote a book; Cricket at the Crossroads, published in 1957.

The following year, Johnson was chosen from a group of 44 candidates for the position of secretary of the Melbourne Cricket Club. The position—previously held by Test cricketers Hugh Trumble and Vernon Ransford—is one of the most prestigious jobs in Australian cricket. During a time of "dramatic change", he helped to maintain the Melbourne Cricket Ground's ("MCG") pre-eminence as a sporting arena. Johnson managed the club and the ground through some major redevelopment, keeping a balance between the competing interests of Australian rules football and cricket. For services to sports administration, he was appointed an Officer of the Order of the British Empire (OBE) in 1976. He played a leading part in organising the Centenary Test, held at the MCG in 1977.

For 20 years, he served as a member of the Victorian state parole board. After serving Melbourne Cricket Club for 26 years, he retired to spend more time at his home in the southern Melbourne suburb of Albert Park and his holiday house in Torquay. In 1982, his OBE was upgraded, when he was invested as a Commander of the Order of the British Empire (CBE) for services to cricket. He died in Melbourne in 1998 following a long illness.

== Style and personality ==
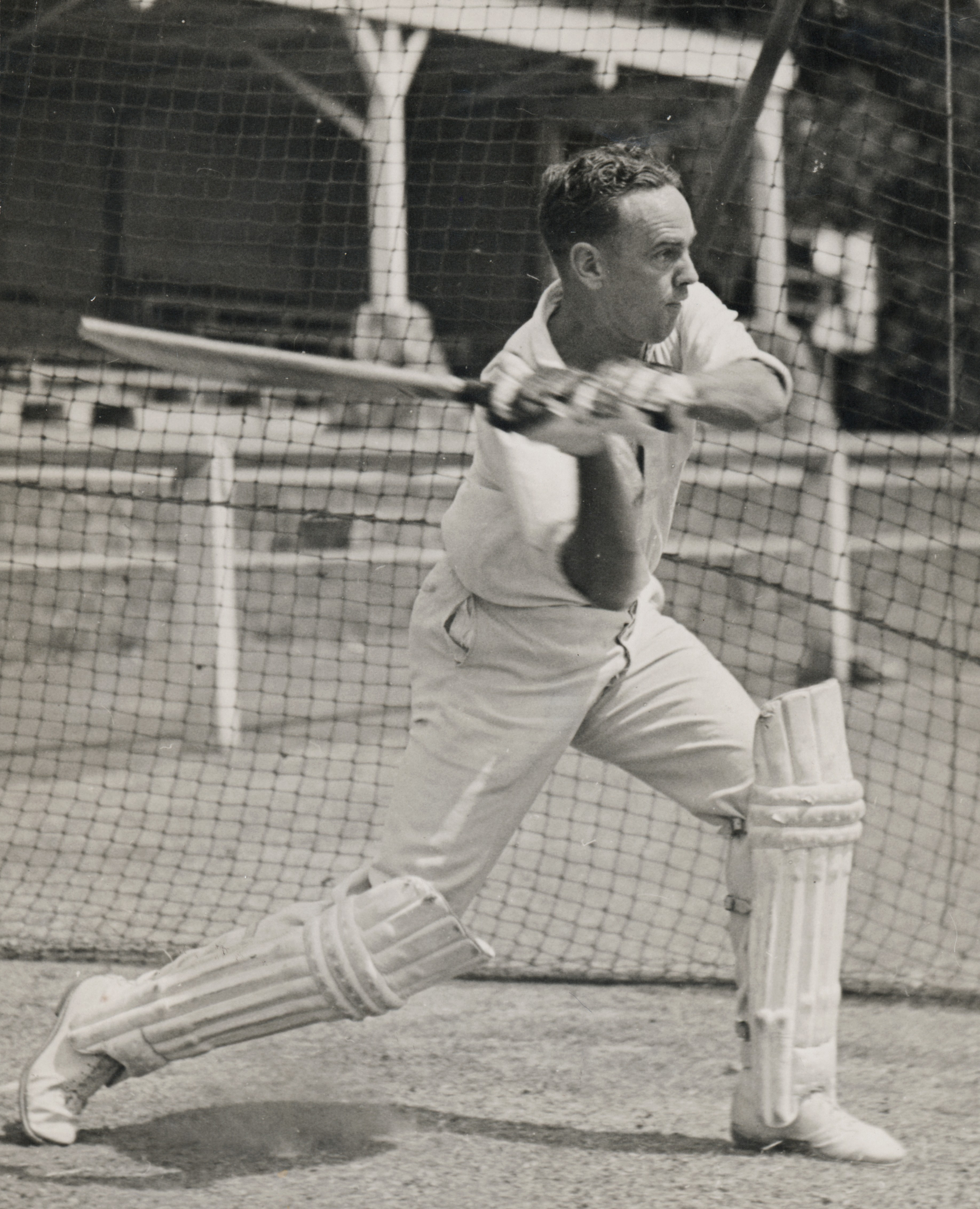
Johnson batting

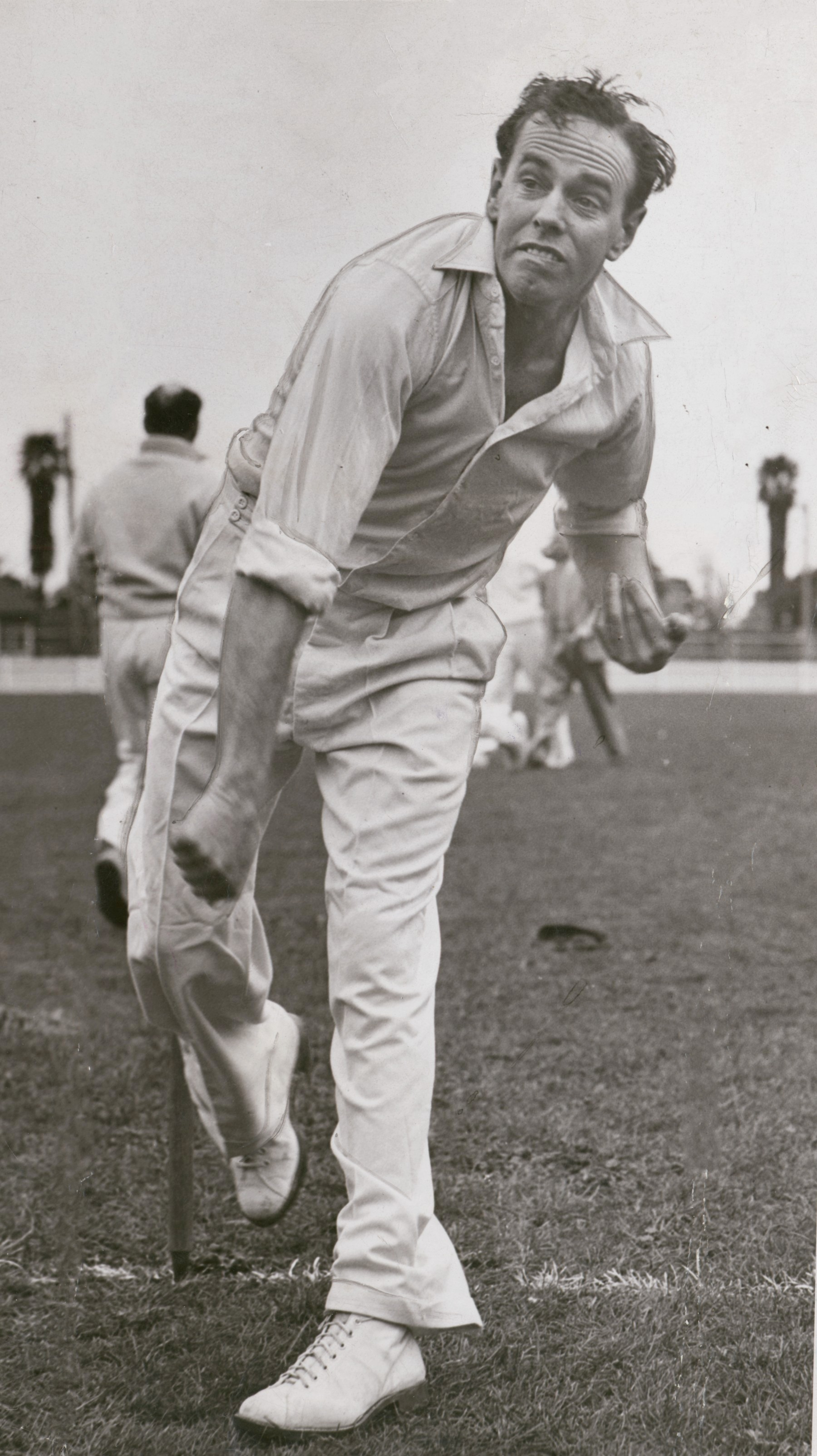
Johnson bowling

Unusually for an Australian, Johnson bowled off-spin rather than the wrist spin normally associated with countrymen of his day. Johnson had an atypical bowling action, with a "rather staccato swing" of his bowling arm. He bowled with a high degree of flight, causing opposing batsmen difficulties in judging where the ball would land. Making intelligent use of the wind, Johnson was able to make his deliveries float away from the batsman, changing from his standard off-break. According to E. W. Swanton, Johnson was "probably the slowest bowler to achieve any measure of success in Test cricket". His action was compared to a corkscrew; writer Ray Robinson saying that "to coax turn from firm Australian pitches he twisted the ball almost hard enough to screw a doorknob off". There were doubts about the legality of his bowling action; his English rival, Trevor Bailey claimed Johnson threw every delivery. Johnson was never no-balled for throwing, having played cricket in front of umpires from Australia, England, New Zealand, South Africa, the West Indies, India and Pakistan.

[Johnson was] at his best on dry crumbling wickets—the wet ones made him too slow. It always looked like he could be hit by a fast-footed batsman. That he wasn't may be put down to his straight ball, which was hard to detect, and often left the striker down the wicket. A most intelligent bowler, always scheming.

— Donald Bradman

Jack Pollard described Johnson as a "dour middle order batsman". He had a sound defence and when necessary could hit the ball with power. Bradman was full of praise for Johnson's batting after the Invincibles tour in 1948: "Splendid batsman—most valuable about number 7", also describing him as a "very good slip field".

As captain, Johnson was noted for his public relations skills and his gift for public speaking. He was optimistic by nature, with a belief in "guts and determination". However, he was seen as insensitive at times; Bill Johnston took offence when Johnson attempted to rouse him during a practise session: "Just cos you are one of the old blokes in the side doesn't mean you don't have to bloody well put in you know." At times his optimism could appear artless and naive. Ian Craig—his successor as Australian captain—was critical of Johnson's attitude during the 1956 tour of England: "I don't think [Johnson] was ever realistic about the situation. [...] I supposed he felt obliged to make rallying speeches, but the team knew what was going on." Pat Crawford felt "Johnson couldn't get anything out of the players, whereas the guys would have busted a gut for [Miller]". He was seen by some of his teammates as "dictatorial" with Benaud and Harvey particularly resenting Johnson's insistence on the entire touring party attending every lead-in match before 1956 Test series in England.

Johnson was sportsmanlike; on one occasion in South Africa, when Eastern Province batsman Ray Connell was bowled after the ball deflected from his head, Johnson replaced the bails, allowing him to continue batting. During the Adelaide Test in 1950–51 he "walked", ensuring that the unlucky John Warr took at least one wicket for the series.

I got the faintest of faint touches and Godfrey [Evans] went up, half-heartedly. John followed him, but the umpire said not out. Well I saw John's shoulders sag, and he looked so crestfallen that on the spur of the moment I nodded to the umpire and walked.

— Ian Johnson

Johnson was not above some gamesmanship, resorting to time-wasting tactics to avoid defeat in the final Test of the 1956 series against England. He was willing to have some fun on occasion; when in the West Indies he convinced a local pilot to allow him to fly the plane carrying the Australian team between Trinidad and nearby Tobago, to the later displeasure of the Australian Board of Control.

Normally diplomatic, in a newspaper article in South Africa, Johnson was blunt with his hosts about race relations in the country: "I am certain that the average man-in-the-street avoids the problem too much for, at the moment, you're living in a fool's paradise". Urbane, courteous and popular with opposition players and spectators, Colin Cowdrey described Johnson as "an astute leader and fine ambassador for cricket".

== Test match performance ==
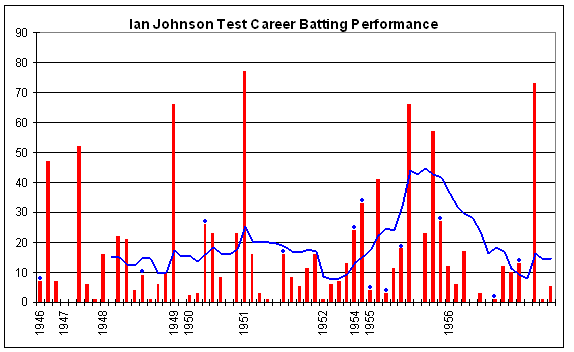
An innings-by-innings breakdown of Johnson's Test match batting career, showing runs scored (red bars) and the average of the last ten innings (blue line). The blue dots indicate an innings where he was not dismissed.

		Batting				Bowling			
Opposition	Matches	Runs	Average	High Score	100 / 50	Runs	Wickets	Average	Best (Inns)
England	22	485	16.72	77	0/2	1590	42	37.85	6/42
India	6	124	15.50	73	0/1	339	19	17.84	4/35
New Zealand	1	7	7.00	7	0/0	–	–	–	–
Pakistan	1	13	13.00	13	0/0	66	4	16.50	4/50
South Africa	6	117	19.50	66	0/1	519	22	23.59	5/34
West Indies	9	254	25.40	66	0/2	668	22	30.36	7/44
Overall	45	1000	18.51	77	0/6	3182	109	29.19	7/44

== Bibliography ==
- Bradman, Donald (1994). Farewell to cricket. Editions Tom Thomson. ISBN 978-1-875892-01-3.
- Cowdrey, Colin (1986). Swanton, E. W (ed.). Barclays world of cricket (Rev. ed.). London: Willow. ISBN 978-0-00-218193-8.
- Derriman, Philip (1987). The top 100 and the 1st XI: the top 100 Australian cricketers and the best eleven of all time. Melbourne: The Fairfax Library. ISBN 978-0-949054-31-9.
- Frith, David (2007). Australia versus England: An illustrated history of every Test match since 1877 (12th ed.). Melbourne: Viking. ISBN 978-0-670-07073-2.
- Haigh, Gideon (2006). The summer game: Cricket in Australia in the 50s and 60s. Sydney: Australian Broadcasting Corporation. ISBN 978-0-7333-2003-3.
- Martin-Jenkins, Christopher (1980). The Complete Who's Who of Test Cricketers. Adelaide: Rigby. ISBN 978-0-7270-1262-3.
- Miller, Keith (1956). Cricket Crossfire. London: Oldbourne Press.
- Perry, Roland (2000). Captain Australia: A History of the Celebrated Captains of Australian Test Cricket. Sydney: Random House Australia. ISBN 978-1-74051-174-2.
- Pollard, Jack (1988). Australian Cricket: The game and the players. Sydney: Angus & Robertson. ISBN 978-0-207-15269-6.
- Robinson, Ray; Haigh, Gideon (1996). On top down under: Australia's cricket captains (revised ed.). Adelaide: Wakefield. ISBN 978-1-86254-387-4.
- Smith, Rick (1999). Cricket's Enigma: The Sid Barnes Story. Sydney: Australian Broadcasting Corporation. ISBN 978-0-7333-0787-4.
- Wiliams, Charles (1996). Bradman: An Australian Hero. London: Little Brown & Company. ISBN 978-0-316-88097-8.
