= Leg theory =

Cricket attack by bowling at or near the line of leg stump

Leg theory is a bowling tactic in the sport of cricket. The term leg theory is somewhat archaic, but the basic tactic remains a play in modern cricket.

Simply put, leg theory involves concentrating the bowling attack at or near the line of leg stump. This may or may not be accompanied by a concentration of fielders on the leg side. The line of attack aims to cramp the batsman, making him play the ball with the bat close to the body. This makes it difficult to hit the ball freely and score runs, especially on the off side. Since a leg theory attack means the batsman is more likely to hit the ball on the leg side, additional fielders on that side of the field can be effective in preventing runs and taking catches.

Stifling the batsman in this manner can lead to impatience and frustration, resulting in rash play by the batsman which in turn can lead to a quick dismissal. Concentrating attack on the leg stump is considered by many cricket fans and commentators to lead to boring play, as it stifles run scoring and encourages batsmen to play conservatively.

Leg theory can be a moderately successful tactic when used with both fast bowling and spin bowling, particularly leg spin to right-handed batsmen or off spin to left-handed batsmen. However, because it relies on lack of concentration or discipline by the batsman, it can be risky against patient and skilled players, especially batsmen who are strong on the leg side. The English opening bowlers Sydney Barnes and Frank Foster used leg theory with some success in Australia in 1911–12. In England, at around the same time, Fred Root was one of the main proponents of the same tactic.

== Fast leg theory ==
In 1930, England captain Douglas Jardine, together with Nottinghamshire's captain Arthur Carr and his bowlers Harold Larwood and Bill Voce, developed a variant of leg theory in which the bowlers bowled fast, short-pitched balls that would rise into the batsman's body, together with a heavily stacked ring of close fielders on the leg side. The idea was that when the batsman defended against the ball, he would be likely to deflect the ball into the air for a catch.

Jardine called this modified form of the tactic fast leg theory. On the 1932–33 English tour of Australia, Larwood and Voce bowled fast leg theory at the Australian batsmen. It turned out to be extremely dangerous, and most Australian players sustained injuries from being hit by the ball. Wicket-keeper Bert Oldfield's skull was fractured by a ball hitting his head (although the ball had first glanced off the bat and Larwood had an orthodox field), almost precipitating a riot by the Australian crowd.

The Australian press dubbed the tactic Bodyline, and claimed it was a deliberate attempt by the English team to intimidate and injure the Australian players. Reports of the controversy reaching England at the time described the bowling as fast leg theory, which sounded to many people to be a harmless and well-established tactic. This led to a serious misunderstanding amongst the English public and the Marylebone Cricket Club – the administrators of English cricket – of the dangers posed by Bodyline. The English press and cricket authorities declared the Australian protests to be a case of sore losing and "squealing".

It was only with the return of the English team and the subsequent use of Bodyline against English players in England by the touring West Indian cricket team in 1933 that demonstrated to the country the dangers it posed. The MCC subsequently revised the Laws of Cricket to prevent the use of "fast leg theory" tactics in future, also limiting the traditional tactic.

== See also ==
- Off theory
