= Off theory =

Off theory is a bowling tactic in the sport of cricket. The term off theory is somewhat archaic and rarely used any more, but the basic tactic still plays a part in modern cricket.

Off theory involves concentrating the line of the bowling attack just outside the off stump. This area is often referred to as the "corridor of uncertainty", as unless a batsman knows exactly where his off-stump is, he will have to play a shot at any ball bowled there. Not doing this runs the risk that the ball will hit the off-stump, which would not only get the batsman out, but leave him looking extremely foolish. The attack is supported with several fielders in a cordon of catching positions called slip fielders behind the wicket on the off side. The aim is to entice the batsman to play at the ball with the bat away from the body ('fishing outside off-stump'). This provides several ways in which the batsman can get out:

- Edging the ball off the outside edge of the bat to the waiting catchers.
- Edging the ball off the inside edge of the bat into the wicket.
- Missing the ball and having it pass between the bat and the leg pads on to the wicket (being bowled "through the gate").

Originally developed in the late 19th century as an alternative to bowling directly at the wicket in an attempt to get batsmen out bowled or leg before wicket, off theory led to the rise in importance of slips and gully fielders as dedicated catching positions. The tactic has evolved until the modern day, in which the usual line of attack by fast bowlers is somewhat further outside the off stump than it was typically in the 19th century.

Off theory, though not normally known by that name now, has become the most common attacking bowling tactic used in cricket. It has thus developed many nuances and can be a ball-by-ball tactical struggle for supremacy between the bowler and batsman that most cricket fans find gripping when executed by a skilled bowler.

== See also ==
- Leg theory
- Bodyline
