= Long hop =

Type of delivery in cricket

A long hop is a type of inadvertent delivery in the sport of cricket. It describes a short delivery which is not especially fast, which is thus easy for the batter to hit because they have plenty of time to observe the speed and direction of the ball after the bounce and choose their shot accordingly. In contrast, a fast short delivery which bounces high (to the batter's chest or higher) is termed a bouncer and is often bowled deliberately because it is difficult to hit safely, due to the height at which it reaches the batter.

A fast ball which pitches short but (due to the vagaries of the wicket surface) does not bounce high is very difficult to defend against, for the batter will usually expect the ball to bounce high in this situation; this can often lead to the batter being out bowled or lbw when they leave a ball which appeared to be rising over the stumps but stayed low. Such deliveries are not called long hops, due to the difficulty they cause the batter.
