= S. K. Gurunathan =

Indian sports journalist

- Born: 1 August 1908
- Died: 5 May 1966 (aged 57)
- Occupation: Sports journalist

S. K. Gurunathan (1 August 1908 – 5 May 1966) was a sports journalist and one of the pioneers of cricket statistics in India.

Gurunathan studied in the Hindu High School in Triplicane, Madras. He started his journalistic career in the advertisement section of The Hindu in 1928. He became a reporter in 1938 and from 1958 till his death, was the sports editor. He founded the Madras Sports Annual which covered local cricket and other sports in the 1940s. While at The Hindu, he started the magazine Sport and Pastime which ran for about twenty years and ceased publication due to labour troubles soon after his death. Gurunathan was the first Honorary Cricket Statistician for the Board of Control for Cricket in India, serving in that post from 1949 to 1950 till his death.

Gurunathan founded the annual Indian Cricket in 1946 on the same lines as the Wisden Cricketers' Almanack and remained its editor till his death. He also regularly contributed to the Indian section of Wisden. He covered more than 50 Test matches including the Indian tours of Australia in 1947–48, England in 1952 and Pakistan in 1954–55, and reported the 1961–62 MCC tour of India for The Times. He authored the books 12 years of Ranji Trophy and three volumes of Story of the Tests. Gurunathan became the Founder-President of the Madras Sports Writers Club in 1963–64.

He was a stylish wicket keeper in his youth and represented the Indians in the Madras Presidency matches. In the Madras League matches, he represented Sundar C.C. He died a few months before he was due to retire from The Hindu.

== Notes ==
- The references used for this article differ in several details. According to P.N. Sundaresan (who worked with Gurunathan for twenty years), Gurunathan was born on 1 July 1908 and became the sports reporter in Hindu in 1937.
