= Bowling (cricket) =

Cricket delivery

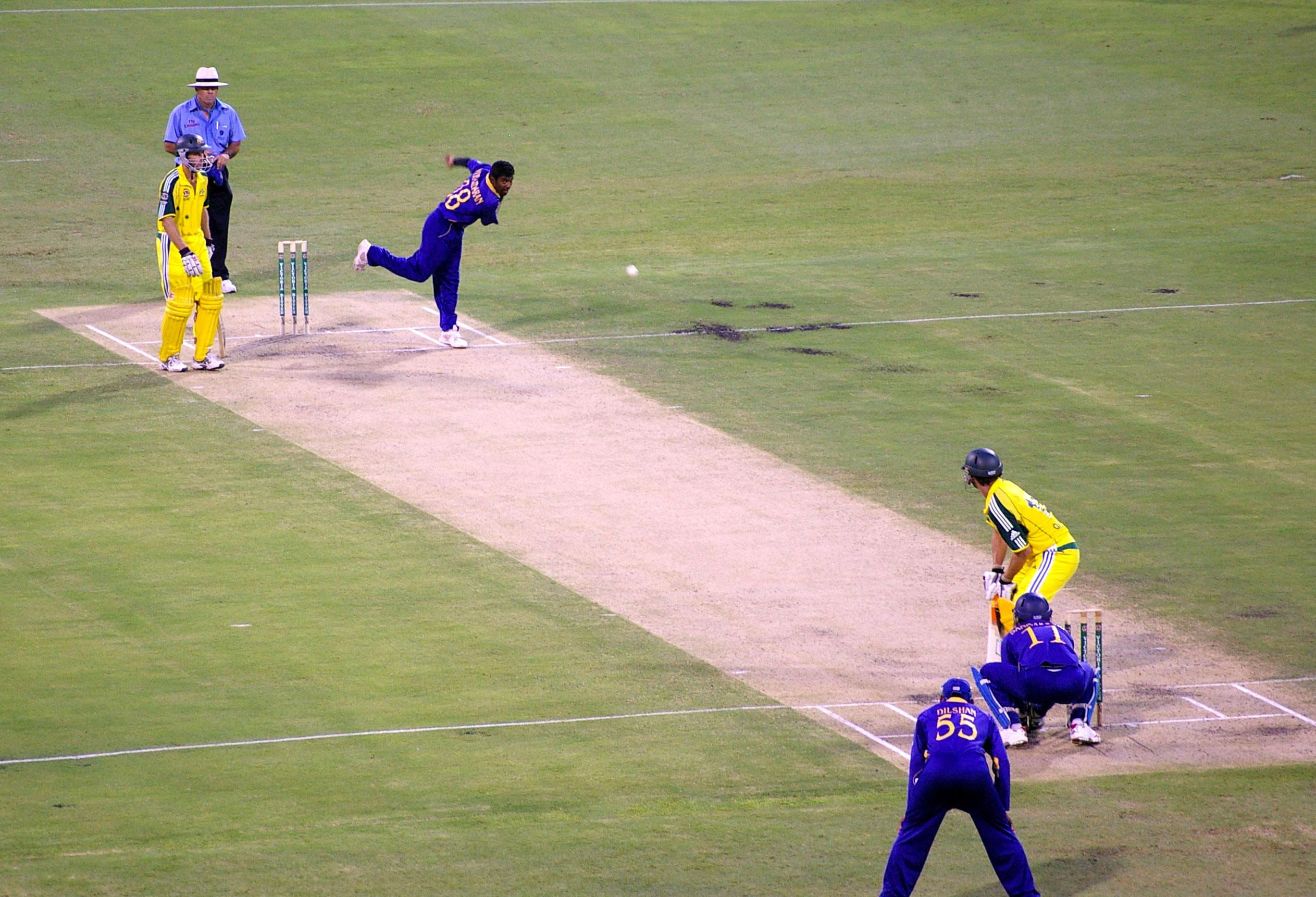
Spinner Muttiah Muralitharan bowling to the batter, Adam Gilchrist

In cricket, bowling is the action of propelling the ball toward the wicket defended by a batter. A player skilled at bowling is called a bowler; a bowler who is also a competent batter is known as an all-rounder. Bowling the ball is distinguished from throwing the ball, which is not allowed, by a strictly specified biomechanical definition, which restricts the angle of extension of the elbow. A single act of bowling the ball towards the batter is called a ball or a delivery. Bowlers bowl deliveries in sets of six, called an over. Once a bowler has bowled an over, a teammate will bowl an over from the other end of the pitch. The Laws of Cricket govern how a ball must be bowled. If a ball is bowled illegally, an umpire will rule it a no-ball. If a ball is bowled too wide of the striker for the batter to be able to play at it with a proper cricket shot, the bowler's end umpire will rule it a wide.

There are different types of bowlers, from fast bowlers, whose primary weapon is pace, through swing and seam bowlers who try to make the ball deviate in its course through the air or when it bounces, to slow bowlers, who will attempt to deceive the batter with a variety of flight and spin. A spin bowler usually delivers the ball quite slowly and puts spin on the ball, causing it to turn at an angle while bouncing off the pitch.

A team can be said to have elected to "have a bowl" when it wins the coin toss and chooses to field.

== History ==
Pakistani Shoaib Akhtar holds the world record for delivering the fastest ball (161.3 km/h (100.2 mph)).

In the early days of cricket, underarm bowling was the only method employed. Many theories exist about the origins of cricket. One suggests that the game began among shepherds hitting a stone or a ball of wool with their crooks and, at the same time, defending the wicket gate into the sheep-fold (from Anglo Saxon 'cricce', a crooked staff). A second theory suggests the name came from a low stool known as a 'cricket' in England, which from the side looked like the long, low wicket used in the early days of the game (originally from the Flemish 'krickstoel', a low stool on which parishioners knelt in church). There is also a reference to 'criquet' in North-East France in 1478 and evidence that the game evolved in South-East England in the Middle Ages.

In 1706 William Goldwyn published the first description of the game. He wrote that two teams were first seen carrying their curving bats to the venue, choosing a pitch and arguing over the rules to be played. They pitched two sets of wickets, each with a "milk-white" bail perched on two stumps; tossed a coin for first knock, the umpire called "play" and the "leathern orb" was bowled. They had four-ball overs, the umpires leant on their staves (which the batters had to touch to complete a run), and the scorers sat on a mound making notches.

The first written "Laws of Cricket" was drawn up in 1744. They stated, "the principals shall choose from amongst the gentlemen present two umpires who shall absolutely decide all disputes. The stumps must be 22 inches high and the bail across them six inches. The ball must be between 5 & 6 ounces, and the two sets of stumps 22 yards apart". There were no limits on the shape or size of the bat. It appears that 40 notches was viewed as a very big score, probably due to the bowlers bowling quickly at shins unprotected by pads. The world's first cricket club was formed in Hambledon in the 1760s and the Marylebone Cricket Club (MCC) was founded in 1787.

During the 1760s and 1770s it became common to pitch the ball through the air, rather than roll it along the ground. This innovation gave bowlers the weapons of length, deception through the air, plus increased pace. It also opened new possibilities for spin and swerve. In response, batters had to master timing and shot selection. One immediate consequence was the replacement of the curving bat with the straight one. All of this raised the premium on skill and lessened the influence of rough ground and brute force. It was in the 1770s that the modern game began to take shape. The weight of the ball was limited to between five and a half and five and three-quarter ounces, and the width of the bat to four inches. The latter ruling followed an innings by a batter called Thomas "Daddy" White, who appeared with a bat the width of the wicket. In 1774, the first leg before law was published. Also around this time, a third stump became commonplace. By 1780, the duration of a first-class cricket match was generally three days, and this year also saw the creation of the first six-seam cricket ball. In 1788, the MCC published its first revision of the laws, which prohibited charging down an opponent and also provided for mowing and covering the wicket to standardise conditions. The desire for standardisation reflected the massive increase in the popularity of cricket during the 18th century. Between 1730 and 1740, 150 cricket matches were recorded in the papers of the time. Between 1750 and 1760, this figure rose to 230, and between 1770 and 1790 over 500.

The 19th century saw a series of significant changes. Wide deliveries were outlawed in 1811. The circumference of the ball was specified for the first time in 1838 (its weight had been dictated 60 years earlier). Pads, made of cork, became available for the first time in 1841, and these were further developed following the invention of vulcanised rubber, which was also used to introduce protective gloves in 1848. In the 1870s, boundaries were introduced – previously, all hits had to be run; if the ball went into the crowd, the spectators would clear a way for the fieldsman to fetch it. The biggest change, however, was in how the ball was delivered by the bowler.

At the start of the century, all bowlers were still delivering the ball under-arm. However, so the story goes, John Willes became the first bowler to use a "round-arm" technique after practising with his sister Christina, who had used the technique, as she was unable to bowl underarm due to her wide dress impeding her delivery of the ball.

The round-arm action came to be employed widely in matches but was quickly determined to be illegal and banned by the MCC, who stated that "the ball must be delivered underhand, not thrown or jerked, with the hand underneath the elbow at the time of delivering the ball". When it was accepted the rules stated that the arm could not be raised above the shoulder. It was quickly found, however, that a raised arm imparted more accuracy and generated more bounce than the roundarm method. Again, the governing body banned the method. It was not until the method was finally accepted by the MCC in 1835 that it grew rapidly in popularity amongst all players. Underarm bowling hitherto had almost disappeared from the game.

=== Modern-day underarm bowling ===
An infamous "underarm bowling incident" occurred during a match in 1981, in which the Australian bowler, Trevor Chappell, took advantage of the fact that underarm bowling was still legal by rolling the ball along the ground. By doing so he avoided the possibility that the New Zealand batter, Brian McKechnie, would score a six from the last ball to tie the match, as the bat would not be able to hit the ball high enough to score a six.

As a result of this incident underarm bowling was subsequently made illegal in all grades of cricket, except by prior agreement of both teams, as it was not considered to be within the spirit of the game.

== The bowling action ==
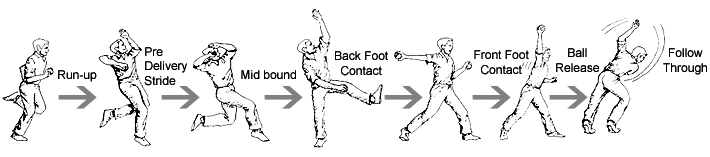
The typical bowling action of a fast bowler.

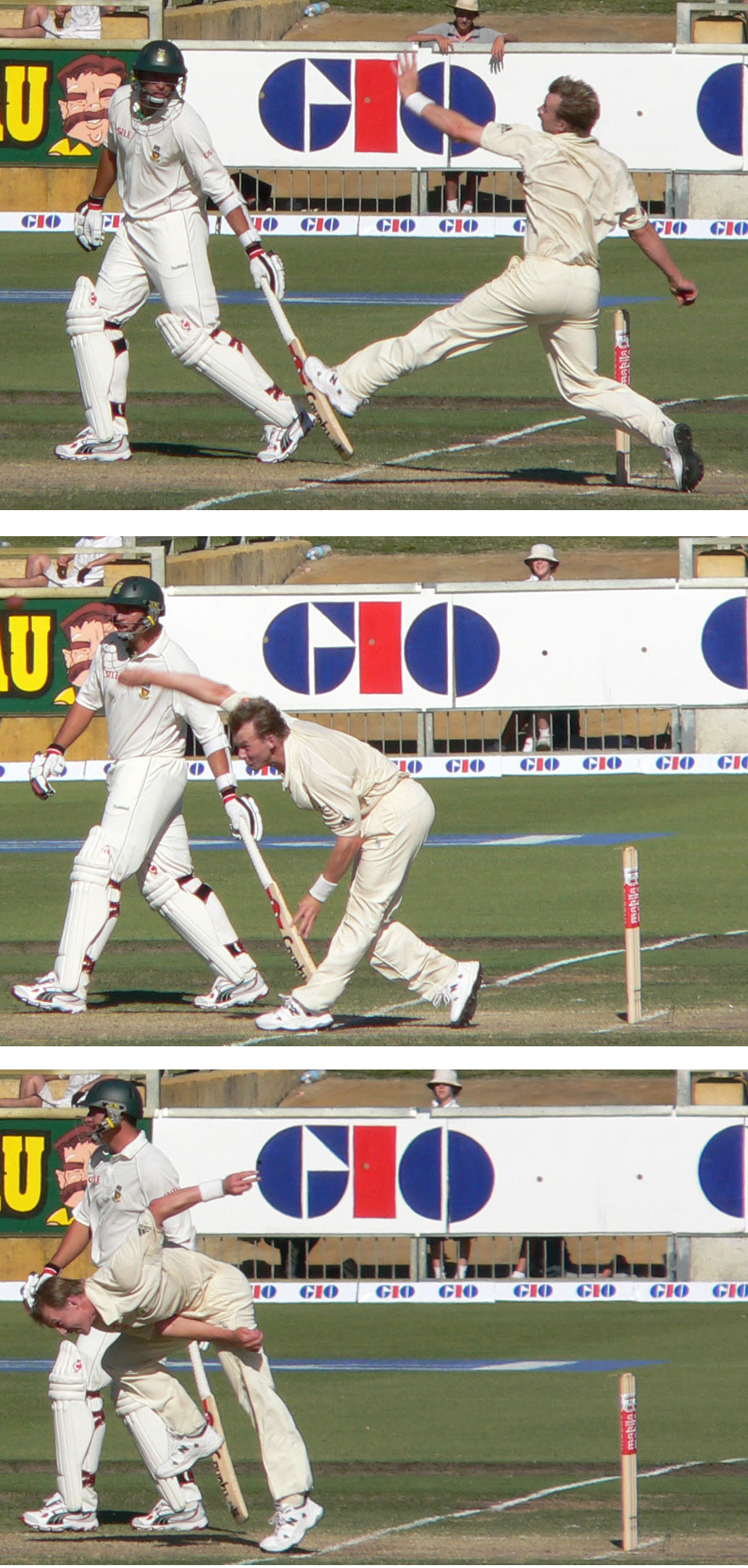
Australian fast bowler Brett Lee in action in 2005.

Bowling the ball is distinguished from simply throwing the ball by a strictly specified biomechanical definition.

Originally, this definition said that the elbow joint must not straighten out during the bowling action. Bowlers generally hold their elbows fully extended and keeping the bowling arm straight, releasing it near the top of the arc. Flexion at the elbow is not allowed, but any extension of the elbow was deemed to be a throw and would be liable to be called a no-ball. This was thought to be possible only if the bowler's elbow was originally held in a slightly flexed position.

In 2005, this definition was deemed to be physically impossible by a scientific investigative commission. Biomechanical studies that showed that almost all bowlers extend their elbows somewhat throughout the bowling action, because the stress of swinging the arm around hyperextends the elbow joint. A guideline was introduced to allow extensions or hyperextensions of angles up to 15 degrees before deeming the ball illegally thrown.

Bowling actions are typically divided into side on and front on actions. In the side on action, the back foot lands parallel to the bowling crease and the bowler aims at the wicket by looking over his front shoulder. In the front on action, the back foot lands pointing down the pitch and the bowler aims at the wicket by looking inside the line of his front arm. Many bowlers operate with a mid-way action with the back foot landing at roughly 45 degrees and the upper body aligned somewhere between side on and front on. This differs from a mixed action, which mixes distinct elements of both side on and front on actions, and is generally discouraged amongst young bowlers as it can lead to problems in later life due to the twisting of the back inherent in the action.

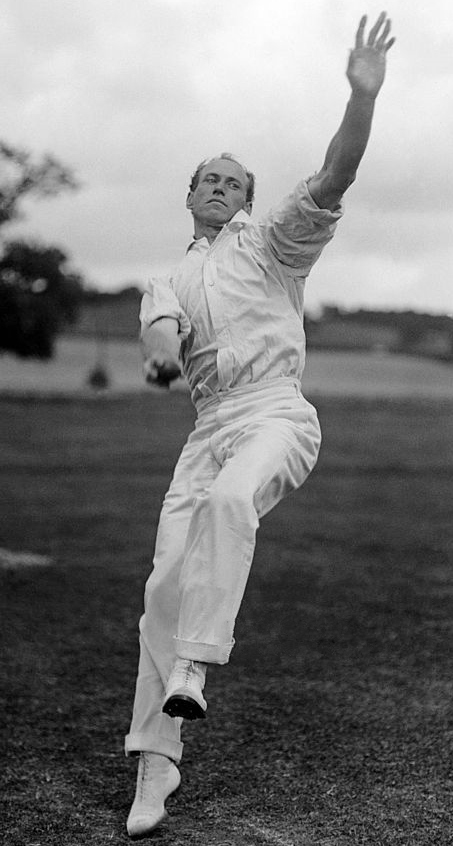
Philadelphian cricketer Bart King bowling

== Goals of bowling ==
In a game of cricket, the ultimate priority of the fielding side is to restrict the total number of runs scored by the batting side, and the actions of the bowlers will be fundamental to achieving this objective. The primary means of achieving this is by dismissing the batting side by getting all ten of the opposition wickets as quickly as possible. A secondary objective will be to keep the batting side's run rate as low as possible. In fact, in most forms of cricket, the twin aims of the fielding side are targeted concurrently, as the achievement of one aim tends to have a positive effect upon the other. Taking regular opposition wickets will remove the better batters from the crease, typically leading to a slowing of the scoring rate. Conversely, slowing the scoring rate can put additional pressure on the batters and force them into taking extra risks, which will often lead to wickets.

Depending upon the format of the match, these two strategies will be given different weights. In an unlimited, timed or declaration match, the main aim of the bowling attack will be to take wickets, so attacking bowling and fielding strategies will be used. In a limited overs match, this aim will also be supplemented by the secondary need to prevent the batting side from scoring quickly, so more defensive strategies will be used. In general, the shorter the number of overs per side, the more priority will be given to this secondary target of maintaining a low run-rate. It is also highly probable that the need for attacking or defensive strategies can switch frequently as a cricket match progresses. It is the sign of a good cricket captain to be able to tell which strategy is most appropriate in any set of circumstances and the best way of implementing it.

== Bowling tactics ==
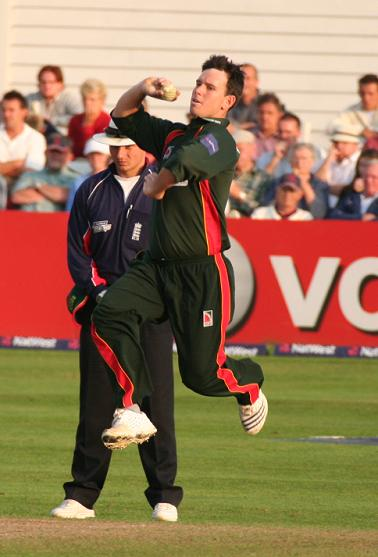
Jim Allenby in midflight, illustrating the position of the body during a delivery at the end of a run up, prior to bowling the ball.

The simultaneous twin objectives of bowling are to take wickets and prevent run scoring opportunities. Both objectives are achieved through the underlying aim of bowling the ball in such a way that the batter is unable to connect with the ball in the middle of the bat and control its movement after contact. There are three distinct means of achieving this aim: by bowling the ball on a good line and length, by bowling with sufficient pace that the batter struggles to react to the delivery, or by bowling the ball in such a way that it has lateral movement as it approaches the batter, either in the air or off the ground. A good bowler may be able to combine two of these skills, a truly great bowler may be able to combine all three.

=== Line and length ===
The fundamental skill of bowling on a good length incorporates the ability to pitch the ball such a distance from the batter that he is unable to move forward and drive the ball on the half volley, and is also unable to step back and play the ball on the back foot. This removes many of the batter's attacking options, and also increases the probability of misjudging a delivery and losing the wicket. A good length delivery is one in which the ball has had sufficient time to move far enough off the pitch to beat the bat but the batter has not had time to react to the movement and adjust the shot. The faster the bowler and the greater the movement he is able to generate, the larger the area of the pitch that can be designated an effective "good" length.

Other areas of the pitch may also often be used as a variation to a good length delivery. Primarily these are the yorker, in which the ball is bowled directly at the batter's feet as a surprise delivery intended to dismiss the batter bowled, and the bouncer in which the ball is bowled on such a short length that it rises towards the batter's throat or head as a means of physical intimidation. But the height of an attempted yorker or full toss must not be higher than the batter's waist, or else it will be called a no-ball beamer, which could have bowlers banned from the match.

The line a bowler chooses to bowl will depend on several factors: the movement he is generating on the ball, the shots the batter is able to play, and the field the captain has set. The two most common tactics are to either bowl directly at the stumps, or to bowl 3 inches to 6 inches outside the line of off stump. Bowling at the stumps is an attacking tactic with the intention of dismissing the batter bowled or lbw. It can also be used as a defensive tactic, as the batter will feel less able to play risky shots knowing that he will be dismissed should he miss the ball. Bowling outside off stump is known as the corridor of uncertainty. When done well, this line may confuse the batter into whether to defend the ball or leave it, and may tempt him to play away from his body with his head not in line with the ball. The main aim of this tactic is to dismiss the batter caught by the wicketkeeper or in the slips. Other bowling variations, such as bowling wide of off stump or bowling at leg stump are generally seen as negative and defensive tactics.

Some different types of bowling tactic:

- Bodyline
- Leg theory
- Off theory

=== Pace and movement ===
Other than the ability to land the ball on a strategically optimum line and length, the main weapons of the bowler are his ability to move the ball sideways as it approaches the batter and his ability to deliver the ball at a high velocity.

The velocities of cricket bowlers vary between 40 and 100 mph (64 and 161 km/h). In professional cricket, a bowler in the 40–60 mph range would be said to be a slow bowler, in the 60–80 mph range a medium pace bowler, and a bowler 80 mph+ a fast bowler. In the amateur game, these distinctions would be approximately 10 mph slower. Many professional fast bowlers are able to reach speeds of over 85 mph, with a handful of bowlers in the world able to bowl at 95 mph+. The ability to react to a cricket ball travelling at 85 mph is a skill that only professional and high level amateur cricketers possess. The pace of a bowler not only challenges the reaction speed of the batter, but also his physical courage. Fast bowlers are able to exploit this by bowling bouncers, either regularly or as an occasional surprise delivery.

Bowlers are also able to get the ball to move sideways by using either spin or swing. Adding a spin to a cricket ball will make it deviate due to the Magnus effect in its flight (like a slider in baseball), and then produce sideways movement off the ground. Swing is obtained by using air pressure differences caused by angling the seam of the cricket ball to produce a lateral movement in the air. Fast bowlers will generally only use swing to obtain movement, but medium pace and slow bowlers will often use a combination of the two. The intention is that in creating movement in the delivery, the batter will misjudge the line of the ball as it arrives, causing him to miss it entirely, in which case he may be dismissed bowled or lbw, or miss-hit it, in which case he may be out caught.

To avoid becoming predictable, a bowler will typically bowl a variety of different deliveries with different combinations of pace and movement. A tactically astute bowler may be able to spot a potential weakness in a batter that a particular delivery may be able to exploit. Bowlers will often also bowl deliveries in preplanned sets, with the intention of dismissing the batter with the final delivery in the set. This is known as "setting a trap" for the batter. batters and bowlers will often also engage in a game of "cat and mouse", in which the bowler varies his tactics to try to trap and dismiss the batter, but the batter also keeps adjusting his tactics in response.

== Limited overs ==
In limited overs cricket, there is a limitation on the number of overs each bowler can bowl. This number depends on the match length, and is usually 20% of the total overs in the innings. For example, the usual limit for twenty-over cricket is four overs per bowler, for forty-over cricket eight per bowler and for fifty-over cricket ten per bowler. There is, however, no limit on the number of overs each bowler may bowl in first-class cricket matches, except that no two overs can be bowled consecutively thus restricting any one bowler from a maximum of 50% (plus 1 over) of each innings total. The rule also applies in terms of breaks within a Test innings (Drinks, Lunch and Tea breaks, end of day and beginning of next day). The rule can only be broken if one finishes the end of the previous match starts the next match.

== See also ==
- Glossary of cricket terms
- Throwing
- Bowling machine
- Fielding
- Batting (cricket)
- Over
- Pitch – throwing a baseball
