= Indian Cricket (annual) =

- Indian Cricket (2004)
- Editor: G. Viswanath
- Former editors: S. K. Gurunathan (1947–1966); P. N. Sundaresan (1967–1974); S. Thyagarajan (1975–1989); P. V. Vaidyanathan (1990–1998)
- Categories: Cricket
- Frequency: Annual (yearbook)
- Format: Print (paperback; hardback standard edition from 1972)
- Publisher: The Hindu
- Founder: The Hindu
- Founded: 1946–47
- First issue: 1 January 1946; 80 years ago
- Final issue Number: 31 December 2004; 2004
- Country: India
- Based in: Chennai, Tamil Nadu
- Language: English

Indian Cricket was a cricket yearbook published by The Hindu from 1946–47 to 2004. There was no 2003 issue and so there are 57 editions in all. During most of its run it was the principal annual of its kind in India. The editions were originally dated by the season covered (e.g., 1946–47) but, since the 1962 edition, the date is the calendar year of publication.

Indian Cricket was founded in 1946–47 under the editorship of S. K. Gurunathan who continued in that role until his death in 1966. He was succeeded by P. N. Sundaresan, sports editor of The Hindu and Indian cricket correspondent of Wisden Cricketer's Almanack. G. Viswanath edited the most recent issues.

The first edition was only 104 pages long, whereas the 2004 edition had 1240 pages. The early issues were paperbacked and then a hardbacked standard edition was issued from 1972.

Indian Cricket was largely inspired by Wisden Cricketers' Almanack. It had the same page size as Wisden and replicated many of Wisden's usual features. It included domestic cricket matches in India and matches played by Indian teams abroad. Match details included brief reports and full scores. There was a detailed statistics section on domestic cricket, India in Test cricket, a small section on Test cricket abroad and obituaries. From its inception, Indian Cricket had a "Five Cricketers of the Year" award, based on Wisden. From 1952, there was a special portrait section that profiled a notable ex-cricketer.

From 1957–58 to 1964–65, there was a rival publication called The Indian Cricket Field Annual edited by Dicky Rutnagur. This also contained full scores of all first-class matches in India and a biographical section on current players. Anandji Dossa was the statistical editor of this publication.

== Editors ==
- S. K. Gurunathan (1947–66)
- P.N. Sundaresan (1967–74)
- S. Thyagarajan (1975–89)
- P.V. Vaidyanathan (1990–98)
- G. Viswanath (1999–2004)
