= Fifth Test, 1948 Ashes series =

Final test in a cricket series between Australia and England

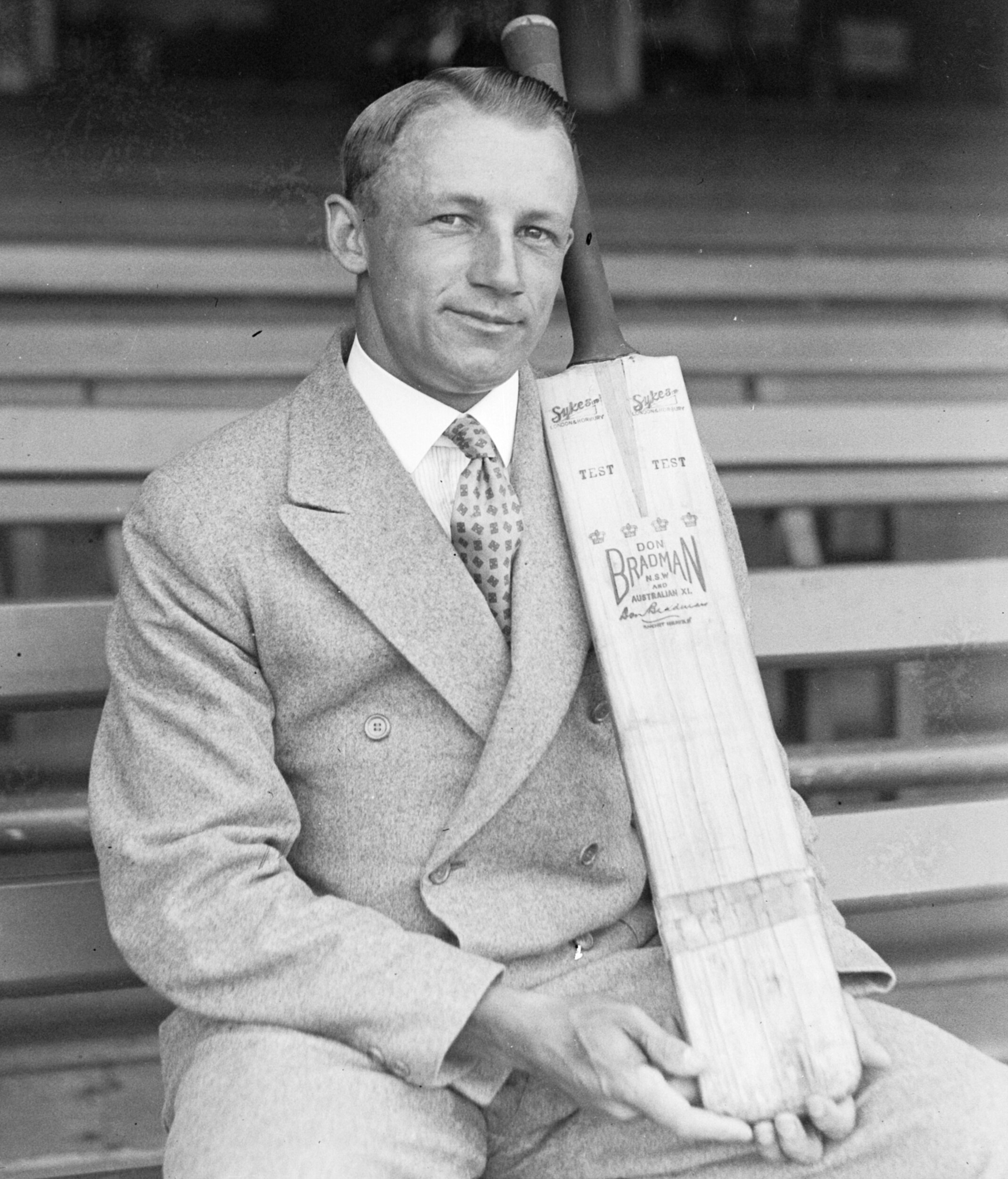
Donald Bradman failed to score any runs in his final innings, being bowled for a duck. Had he scored just four, Bradman would have retired with a Test average of exactly 100.

The Fifth Test of the 1948 Ashes series, held at The Oval in London, was the final Test in that cricket series between Australia and England. The match took place on 14–18 August, with a rest day on 15 August. Australia won the match by an innings and 149 runs to complete a 4–0 series win. It was the last Test in the career of Australian captain Donald Bradman, generally regarded as the best batsman in the history of the sport. Going into the match, if Australia batted only once, Bradman needed only four runs from his final innings to have a Test batting average of exactly 100, but he failed to score, bowled second ball for a duck by leg spinner Eric Hollies.

With the series already lost, the England selectors continued to make many changes, on this occasion, four. In all, they had used 21 players for the series and were severely criticised for failing to maintain continuity. England captain Norman Yardley won the toss, and elected to bat on a pitch affected by rain. After a delayed start due to inclement weather, the Australian pace attack, led by Ray Lindwall, dismissed England within the first day for just 52. Lindwall was the main destroyer, taking six wickets for 20 runs (6/20). The English batsmen found it difficult to cope with his prodigious swing and pace; four of his wickets were either bowled or leg before wicket. Len Hutton was the only batsman to resist, making 30 before being the final man dismissed. In reply, Australia's opening pair of Arthur Morris and Sid Barnes passed England's score on the same afternoon with no loss of wickets. The opening stand ended at 117 when Barnes fell for 61 and Bradman came to the crease to a standing ovation and three cheers from his opponents. He fell second ball, but Australia reached 153/2 at stumps on the first day.

On the second day, Australian batsmen fell regularly once Lindsay Hassett was dismissed at 226/3, most of them being troubled by Hollies, who had been selected after taking 8/107 against Australia for Warwickshire. Morris was an exception and he made 196, more than half his team's total, before being run out as Australia were dismissed for 389. Hollies took 5/131. England reached 54/1 at stumps and by lunch on the third day were 121/2, Hutton and Denis Compton batting steadily. However, they suffered a late collapse to be 178/7 when bad light and rain stopped the day's play. Hutton top-scored for the second time in the match for England, making 64. The next morning, Bill Johnston took the last three wickets as England were bowled out for 188, ending the match. Johnston ended with 4/40 and Lindwall 3/50.

The match was followed by speeches from both captains, after which the crowd sang "For He's a Jolly Good Fellow" in Bradman's honour. Having been undefeated in their matches up to this point, the Australians maintained their streak in the remaining fixtures, gaining them the sobriquet of The Invincibles.

== Background ==
After the first four Tests, Australia led the series 3–0, having won all but the Third Test, which was rain-affected. They had taken an unlikely win in the Fourth Test at Headingley, scoring 404/3 in their second innings, the highest ever score in a successful Test runchase.

Australia had been unbeaten throughout the tour. Between the Fourth and Fifth Test, they played five tour matches. They defeated Derbyshire by an innings, before having a washout against Glamorgan. The Australians then defeated Warwickshire by nine wickets, before drawing with Lancashire, who hung on with three wickets in hand on the final day. Australia's final lead-in outing was a two-day non-first-class match against Durham, which was drawn after rain washed out the second day.

With the series already lost, England made four changes to their team. John Dewes replaced Cyril Washbrook—who broke his thumb in a match for Lancashire against the Australians—at the top of the order. Dewes had gained attention after scoring 51 for Middlesex in the tour match against the Australians. In the three weeks between then and the Test, he had scored 105 and 89 against Lancashire and Sussex respectively. However, he had averaged less than 40 for the season and made three consecutive scores below 20 leading into the Tests. The journalist and former Australian Test cricketer Bill O'Reilly condemned the decision, claiming that aside from defending the ball, Dewes was too reliant on slogging towards the leg side with a horizontal bat. O'Reilly claimed Dewes was not ready for Test cricket and that asking him to face the rampant Australians could have psychologically scarred him. He said the selection "was tantamount to asking a young first-year medical student to carry out an intricate operation with a butcher's knife."

Allan Watkins replaced Ken Cranston as the middle order batsman and pace bowler. Both Dewes and Watkins were making their Test debut, and the latter became the second Welshman to play in an Ashes Test. Watkins had scored 19 and taken 1/47 for Glamorgan in their match against Australia two weeks earlier, but had only scored 168 runs at 18.66 and taken 11 wickets in his last six matches. Cranston had made a duck and 10, and taken 1/79 on his debut in the previous Test. While acknowledging Cranston's poor performances and concluding that he had not been of international quality, O'Reilly said Watkins' performance in Glamorgan's match against the Australians "had not inspired anyone with his ability" to counter the tourists' bowling.

England played two spinners; left arm orthodox spinner Jack Young replaced fellow finger spinner Jim Laker, while the leg spin of Eric Hollies replaced the pace bowling of Dick Pollard. Hollies was brought into the team because he had caused the Australian batsmen difficulty in the tour match against Warwickshire. He took 8/107 in the first innings, the best innings figures against the Australians for the summer. His performance included bowling Bradman with a topspinner that went between bat and pad. It was part of a month-long run in which he took 52 wickets in seven matches, including two ten-wicket match hauls. Young had taken 12 and 14 wickets in consecutive matches against Northamptonshire and Surrey since his omission following the Third Test, while Pollard and Laker had managed totals of only 2/159 and 3/206 respectively in the Headingley Test.

Having made only 5 and 18 in the previous Test, Jack Crapp was originally dropped from the team but was reprieved by Washbrook's injury. The England selectors were widely condemned for their decisions, which were seen as an investment in youth rather than necessarily picking the best players available at the time. Their frequent changes meant the home team had used a total of 21 players for the five Tests.

Australia made three changes. Having taken only seven wickets in the first four Tests at an average of 61.00, off spinner Ian Johnson was replaced by leg spinner Doug Ring. Australia's second change was forced on them; the injured medium pacer Ernie Toshack was replaced by the opening batsman Sid Barnes, who had missed the Fourth Test with a rib injury. This meant Australia were playing with one extra batsman and one less frontline bowler. The final change was the return of first-choice wicket-keeper Don Tallon from injury and the omission of his deputy Ron Saggers.

The two nations had last met at The Oval in the Fifth Test of the 1938 Ashes series, during Australia's previous tour of England. On that occasion, England made a Test world record score of 903/7 declared, and Len Hutton made 364, an individual Test world record. Australia batted in both innings with only nine men because of injuries sustained by Bradman and Jack Fingleton during Hutton's 13-hour marathon effort. They collapsed to the heaviest defeat in Test history, by an innings and 579 runs. It was Australia's last Test before World War II and they had not lost a Test since then.

Hundreds of spectators had slept on wet pavements outside the stadium in rainy weather on the eve of the Test to queue for tickets. Bradman had announced his forthcoming retirement at the end of the season, so the public were anxious to witness his last appearance at Test level.

== Scorecard ==
Umpires	(England) D Davies (England) HG Baldwin
Toss	England elected to bat first
Result	Australia won by an innings and 149 runs
Series impact	Australia won 5-match series 4–0

=== England innings ===
England	First innings		Second innings	
Batsman	Method of dismissal	Runs	Method of dismissal	Runs
L. Hutton	c Tallon b Lindwall	30	c Tallon b Miller	64
J. G. Dewes	b Miller	1	b Lindwall	10
W. J. Edrich	c Hassett b Johnston	3	b Lindwall	28
D. C. S. Compton	c Morris b Lindwall	4	c Lindwall b Johnston	39
J. F. Crapp	c Tallon b Miller	0	b Miller	9
* N. W. D. Yardley	b Lindwall	7	c Miller b Johnston	9
A. J. Watkins	lbw b Johnston	0	c Hassett b Ring	2
+ T. G. Evans	b Lindwall	1	b Lindwall	8
A. V. Bedser	b Lindwall	0	b Johnston	0
J. A. Young	b Lindwall	0	not out	3
E. W. Hollies	not out	0	c Morris b Johnston	0
Extras		6		16
Total	(42.1 overs)	52	(105.3 overs)	188

Australia	First innings				Second innings			
Bowler	Overs	Maidens	Runs	Wickets	Overs	Maidens	Runs	Wickets
R. R. Lindwall	16.1	5	20	6	25	3	50	3
K. R. Miller	8	5	5	2	15	6	22	2
W. A. Johnston	16	4	20	2	27.3	12	40	4
S. J. E. Loxton	2	1	1	0	10	2	16	0
D. T. Ring	–	–	–	–	28	13	44	1

=== Australia innings ===
Australia	First innings		Second innings	
Batsman	Method of dismissal	Runs	Method of dismissal	Runs
S. G. Barnes	c Evans b Hollies	61		
A. R. Morris	run out	196		
* D. G. Bradman	b Hollies	0		
A. L. Hassett	lbw b Young	37		
K. R. Miller	st Evans b Hollies	5		
R. N. Harvey	c Young b Hollies	17		
S. J. E. Loxton	c Evans b Edrich	15		
R. R. Lindwall	c Edrich b Young	9		
+ D. Tallon	c Crapp b Hollies	31		
D. T. Ring	c Crapp b Bedser	9		
W. A. Johnston	not out	0		
Extras		9		
Total	(158.2 overs)	389		

England	First Innings				Second Innings			
Bowler	Overs	Maidens	Runs	Wickets	Overs	Maidens	Runs	Wickets
A. V. Bedser	31.2	9	61	1				
A. J. Watkins	4	1	19	0				
J. A. Young	51	16	118	2				
E. W. Hollies	56	14	131	5				
D. C. S. Compton	2	0	6	0				
W. J. Edrich	9	1	38	1				
N. W. D. Yardley	5	1	7	0				

== 14 August: Day One ==
English skipper Norman Yardley won the toss and elected to bat on a rain-affected pitch. Precipitation in the week leading up to the match meant the Test could not start until after midday. Yardley's decision was regarded as a surprise. Although The Oval had a reputation as a batting paradise, weather conditions suggested that bowlers would be at an advantage. Jack Fingleton, a former Test teammate of Bradman who was covering the tour as a journalist, thought the Australians would have bowled had they won the toss. However, O'Reilly disagreed, saying the pitch was so wet it should have favoured the batsmen because the ball would bounce slowly from the surface. He further thought the slippery run-up areas would have forced the faster bowlers to operate less vigorously to avoid injuring themselves. The damp conditions necessitated the addition of large amounts of sawdust to allow the bowlers to keep their footing, because parts of the pitch were muddy. The humidity, along with the rain, assisted the bowlers; Lindwall in particular managed to make the ball bounce at variable heights.

Dewes and Len Hutton opened for England, a move that attracted criticism of Yardley for exposing the debutant Dewes to the new ball bowling of Lindwall and Keith Miller. After Hutton opened the scoring with a single from the second ball of the day, Dewes was on strike. The single had almost turned into a five when Sam Loxton fired in a wide return, but Sid Barnes managed to prevent from going for four overthrows. Dewes took a single from the opening over—bowled by Lindwall—and thus faced the start of the second over, which was delivered by Miller. Dewes had been troubled by Miller in the past. During the Victory Tests in 1945, Miller had repeatedly dismissed the batsman, and during a match for Cambridge University against the Australians earlier in the tour, Dewes had used towels to pad his torso against Miller's short balls. During his short innings, Dewes was also visibly nervous and kept on moving around, unable to stand still.

Miller caused a stoppage after his first ball in order to sprinkle sawdust on the crease. With the second ball, he bowled Dewes—who was playing across the line—middle stump for one with an inswinger to leave England at 2/1. However, despite the early wicket, the bowlers appeared to lack confidence in their run-up on the soggy ground. Bradman made an early bowling change and brought Johnston into the attack to replace Miller after the latter had bowled three overs for the concession of two runs. At this time, Bradman adopted relatively defensive field settings despite the early breakthrough. Bill Edrich joined Hutton and they played cautiously until the former attempted to hook a short ball from Johnston. He failed to get the ball in the middle of the bat and it looped up and travelled around 10 metres (33 ft). Lindsay Hassett took the catch just behind square leg, diving sideways and getting two hands to the ball. This left England at 10/2 as Denis Compton came to the crease. Lindwall bounced Compton, drawing an edge that flew towards the slips cordon. However, the ball continued to rise and cleared the ring of Australian fielders. Hutton called Compton for a run, but his surprised partner was watching the ball narrowly evade the slips catchers and dropped his bat in panic. Luckily for Compton, the ball went to Hassett at third man, who stopped the ball and waited for Compton to regain his bat and his composure before returning the ball, thereby forfeiting the opportunity to run him out. However, this sporting gesture did not cost Australia many runs because when Compton was on three, Lindwall bowled another bouncer. Compton went for a hook shot and Arthur Morris ran from his position at short square leg to take a difficult catch. Bradman later said he had remembered how Compton had been out in exactly the same position in the corresponding match at the same ground during the 1938 series. Fingleton described Morris's effort as "one of the catches of the season". England were 17/3, and Crapp came in to join Hutton. At this point, Bradman began to put in place more attacking field settings. Johnston then hit Hutton on the fingers with a ball that rose sharply after pitching. Bradman took Lindwall off after 50 minutes and replaced him with Miller, who then removed Crapp, caught behind from an outside edge for a 23-ball duck, leaving England at 23/4. When play was adjourned for lunch with England on 29/4, Hutton was 17 while Yardley was on four. According to Fingleton, Hutton "had never been in the slightest difficulty". He had played cautiously but did not seem hurried by the bowling. Miller had taken 2/3 from six overs.

After the lunch break, England added six runs to be 35/4, before Lindwall bowled Yardley with a swinging yorker. The debutant Watkins came in, having earned a reputation in Glamorgan's match against Australia for hooking. He made several attempts at the shot in his innings of 16 balls. He attempted a hook shot from a short ball and missed before being hit on the shoulder by another Lindwall bouncer, having tried to hook the ball downwards in an unorthodox manner akin to a tennis serve. He was then dismissed without scoring after playing across the line and being trapped leg before wicket by Johnston for a duck to leave England at 42/6. For his troubles, Watkins also collected a bruise from the hit to the shoulder, which inhibited his bowling later in the match. Lindwall then removed Godfrey Evans, Alec Bedser and Young, all yorked by swinging deliveries in the space of two runs, as England fell from 45/6 to 47/9. This brought Hollies in at No. 11 to accompany Hutton, who then hit the only boundary of the innings, lofting Lindwall for a straight drive back over his head. The ball almost went for six, landing just short of the boundary. The innings ended at 52 when Hutton—who never appeared troubled by the bowling—leg glanced Lindwall and was caught by wicket-keeper Don Tallon, who caught the ball one-handed at full stretch to his left. Lindwall described the catch as one of the best he had ever seen, while O'Reilly called it "extraordinarily good".

The match saw Lindwall at his best. In his post-lunch spell, Lindwall bowled 8.1 overs, taking five wickets for eight runs, and finishing with 6/20 from 16.1 overs. Bradman described the spell as "the most devastating and one of the fastest I ever saw in Test cricket". Fingleton, who played against the Bodyline attack in 1932–33, said "I was watching a man almost the equal of Larwood [the Bodyline spearhead] in pace ... Truly a great bowler". O'Reilly wrote Lindwall's "magnificent performance must go down as one of the greatest bowling efforts in Anglo-Australian Tests. He had two gruelingly long sessions in the innings and overcame each so well that he set the seal on his well-earned reputation as one of the best bowlers ever." Hutton was the only batsman to resist the Lindwall-led attack, scoring 30 in 124 minutes and surviving 147 deliveries. The next most resilient display was from Yardley, who scored seven runs in 31 minutes of resistance, facing 33 balls. Miller and Johnston took 2/5 and 2/20 respectively, and Australia's pace trio removed all the batsmen without Bradman having to call upon Ring's leg spin.

In contrast, Australia batted with apparent ease, as the overcast skies cleared and sun came out. The debutant Watkins sent down four overs for 19 runs with his bruised shoulder and did not bowl again. He was in much pain and his limp bowling did little to trouble the Australian openers. Morris and Barnes batted comfortably and passed England's first innings total by themselves, taking less than an hour to push the Australians into the lead. O'Reilly felt the Australian openers wanted to prove "the pitch itself had nothing whatever to do with the English batting debacle". Australia reached 100 at 17:30 with Barnes on 52 and Morris on 47. The only chance came when Barnes powerfully square cut Bedser low to point, where Young spilled the catch. When Young came on to bowl, his finger spin was expected to trouble the batsmen on a rain-affected surface, but he delivered little variation in pace and trajectory and Barnes in particular hit him repeatedly through the off side field. The score had reached 117 after only 126 minutes, when Barnes was caught behind from Hollies for 61. The right-handed Australian opener stumbled forward to a fast-turning leg break that caught his outside edge. He had overbalanced and would have been stumped if he had failed to make contact with the leather. This brought Bradman to the crease shortly before 18:00, late on the first day. As Bradman had already announced the tour would be his last at international level, the innings would be his last at Test level if Australia batted only once. The crowd gave him a standing ovation as he walked out to bat; Yardley led the Englishmen and the crowd in giving his Australian counterpart three cheers, before shaking Bradman's hand. With 6,996 Test career runs, Bradman needed only four runs to average exactly 100 in Test cricket. Bradman took guard and played the first ball from Hollies, a leg break, from the back foot. The leg spinner pitched the next ball up, bowling Bradman for a duck with a googly that went between bat and pad as the Australian skipper leaned forward. Bradman appeared stunned by what had happened and slowly turned around and walked back to the pavilion, receiving another large round of applause. It was claimed by many, including Hollies, that Bradman became emotional and had tears in his eyes at the ovation given to him by the crowd and the English players, and that this hampered his ability to see and hit the ball. Bradman admitted to being moved by the applause, but always denied shedding tears, saying "to suggest I got out, as some people did, because I had tears in my eyes while I was looking at the bowler was quite untrue. Eric Hollies deceived me and he deserves full credit."

Hassett came in at 117/2 and together with Morris saw Australia to the close at 153/2. Morris was unbeaten on 77, having hit two hook shots from Hollies for four. Hassett was on 10.

== 16 August: Day Two ==
15 August was a Sunday, and thus a rest day. Play resumed on Monday, the second morning, and Morris registered his third century of the Test series and his sixth in ten Ashes matches. Overall, it was his seventh century in 14 Tests. It had taken him 208 minutes and he had hit four fours. Hassett and Morris took the score to 226 before their 109-run stand was broken when Young trapped Hassett lbw for 37 after 134 minutes of batting. As the Australians had dismissed their hosts cheaply on the first day and were already well in the lead, they had plenty of time to complete a victory, so Hassett and Morris had no need to take undue risks and scored at a sedate pace. The following batsmen were unable to establish themselves at the crease. Miller came in and tried to attack, but made only five before overbalancing and stumbling forward out of his crease, allowing Evans to stump him from the bowling of Hollies. Harvey, the youngest player in the Australian squad at the age of 19, came to the crease at 243/4 and quickly displayed the exuberance of youth. He hit Young for a straight-driven four and then pulled him for another boundary, but the attacking strokeplay did not last. Harvey succumbed to Hollies, hitting him to Young. The young batsman was having trouble against the turning ball, so he decided to use his feet and step towards the pitch of the ball. The Warwickshire spinner noticed this, and delivered a topspinner that dipped more than usual, and the batsman mistimed his off-drive, which went in the air towards mid-off. Hollies' success against the middle-order prompted Yardley to opt to continue with the older ball even when a replacement was available, a move that was rarely made throughout the series as the pacemen dominated the bowling. Hollies did not spin the ball significantly but relied on variations in flight to defeat his opponents.

Loxton came in with the score at 265/5 and accompanied Morris for 39 further runs before he fell to the new ball. He appeared uncomfortable with the outswingers and leg cutters of Bedser, and was beaten several times, before Edrich had him caught behind for 15. Lindwall came in and attacked immediately, scoring two fours before falling for nine. He played a cover drive from the bowling of Young, but hit the ball too early and thus launched it into the air, and it was caught by Edrich at cover point to leave the score at 332/7. Morris was then finally removed for 196, ending an innings noted for its numerous hooks and off-drives. It took a run out to remove Morris; he attempted a quick run to third man after being called through from the non-striker's end by Tallon, but was too slow for the substitute fielder Reg Simpson's arm. Tallon, who scored 31, put on another 30 runs with Ring, before both were out with Australia's score on 389, ending the tourists' innings. Both were caught by Crapp in slips from the bowling of Hollies and Bedser respectively. Morris had scored more than half the runs as the rest of the team struggled against the leg spin of Hollies, who took 5/131. England had relied heavily on spin bowling; Young took 2/118 and of the 158.2 overs bowled, 107 were delivered by the two slow men. Hollies pitched the ball up repeatedly, coaxing the Australians into playing front-foot shots from balls that spun after pitching on off stump.

England started their second innings 337 runs in arrears. Dewes took strike and got off the mark from Lindwall when he aimed a hook shot and was credited with a boundary when the ball came off his shoulder. Lindwall's steepling bouncer rose over his bat and narrowly missed his head. Soon after, Lindwall made the early breakthrough, bowling Dewes—who offered no shot—for 10 to leave England 20/1. Dewes had often committed to playing the ball from the front foot before the bowler delivered the ball, thereby putting himself into difficulty. This was because of his habit of leaning his weight onto his back foot as the ball was being bowled, which meant that a forward lean would instinctively result. Edrich joined Hutton and the pair consolidated the England innings, which reached 54/1 at the close at the second day's play, which was hastened by bad light.

== 17 August: Day Three ==
Early on the third day, Lindwall bowled Edrich—who was playing across the line—between bat and pad for 28, hitting the off stump with a ball that cut inwards, leaving the score at 64/2, before Compton and Hutton consolidated the innings and took the score to 121 at lunch without further loss. Hutton and Compton were 42 and 37 respectively. Compton started slowly but had accelerated as the adjournment approached. The morning's batting had been relatively slow, with only 67 runs scored in 100 minutes, of which Hutton added only 23. The morning session also featured a tight spell of 13 overs by Ring. The leg spinner did not bowl consistently or accurately, and although the batsman hit him regularly, they did not place their shots, which often went to the fielders. At the other end, Johnston bowled his finger spin from around the wicket with a well-protected off side. There were four men in the off side ring and they had much work to do as Hutton hit the ball there repeatedly. The English batsmen progressed steadily and both Johnston and Ring had one confident appeal for lbw against Compton, but there were no other scares. Towards the end of the morning session, the second new ball became available but Bradman decided to bide his time. He allowed Johnston to rest after his morning spell and used Lindwall and Miller—delivering off spinners—to bowl with the old ball for the last half-hour before lunch break so that the trio could use the adjournment to recuperate before attacking with the new ball.

After lunch, Lindwall and Johnston took the new ball, and the partnership progressed only four further runs to 61 in 110 minutes. On 39, Compton aimed a hard cut shot from Johnston's bowling, which flew into Lindwall's left hand at second slip for a "freak slip catch". Hutton managed to continue resisting the Australians before Miller struck Crapp in the neck with a bouncer. The batsman did not react to the blow and did not bother to rub the point of impact. After hitting a series of cover drives for boundaries, Hutton edged Miller to Tallon and was out for 64, having top-scored in both innings. He had batted for over four hours and left England at 153/4. Thereafter, the home side collapsed. Crapp was bowled by Miller for nine, and two runs later, Ring dismissed debutant Watkins for two, his only wicket for the match. Watkins swung Ring to the leg side and the ball went straight into the hands of Hassett, who did not need to move from his position on the boundary, leaving England at 167/6. Lindwall returned and yorked Evans, who appeared to not detect the delivery in the poor light, for eight. The umpires thus called off play after Yardley appealed against the light. The ground was then hit by rain, resulting in a premature end to the day's play with England at 178/7, having lost 4/25.

== 18 August: Day Four ==
England resumed on the fourth morning with only three wickets in hand and they were still 159 runs in arrears. Johnston quickly removed the last three wickets to seal an Australian victory by an innings and 149 runs. Only ten runs were added; the match ended when Hollies fell for a golden duck after skying a ball to Morris, immediately after Yardley's departure. Johnston ended with 4/40 from 27.3 overs while Lindwall took 3/50 from 25 overs. Miller claimed 2/22 while Ring bowled the most overs, 28, to finish with 1/44. Given the time lost to inclement weather on the first day, Australia had won the match in less than three days of playing time.

== Aftermath ==
This result sealed the series 4–0 in favour of Australia. The match was followed by a series of congratulatory speeches. Bradman began with:

No matter what you may read to the contrary, this is definitely my last Test match ever. I am sorry my personal contribution has been so small ... It has been a great pleasure for me to come on this tour and I would like you all to know how much I have appreciated it ... We have played against a very lovable opening skipper ... It will not be my pleasure to play ever again on this Oval but I hope it will not be the last time I come to England.

Yardley spoke after Bradman:

In saying good-bye to Don we are saying good-bye to the greatest cricketer of all time. He is not only a great cricketer but a great sportsman, on and off the field. I hope this is not the last time we see Don Bradman in this country.

Bradman was then given three cheers and the crowd sang "For He's a Jolly Good Fellow" before dispersing.

The win brought Australia closer to Bradman's aim of going through the tour undefeated. The Fifth Test was the last international match, and Australia only had seven further matches to negotiate. They secured three consecutive innings victories against Kent, the Gentlemen of England and Somerset. They then took first innings leads of more than 200 against the South of England and Leveson-Gower's XI, but both matches were washed out. The last two matches were two-day non-first-class matches against Scotland, both won by an innings. Bradman's men thus completed the tour undefeated, earning themselves the sobriquet The Invincibles.
