= Third Test, 1948 Ashes series =

Australia-England test cricket match

The Third Test of the 1948 Ashes series was one of five Tests in the Ashes cricket series between Australia and England. The match was played at Old Trafford in Manchester from 8 to 13 July 1948, with a rest day on 11 July. The match was drawn after the whole of the fourth day and the first half of the fifth day was washed out due to rain; England had the upper hand before the weather intervened. The draw maintained Australia's 2–0 lead in the series, which was established through victories in the first two Tests. As Australia were the holders of The Ashes, the draw meant that England could do no better than level the series 2–2 by winning the last two Tests, and thus Australia retained The Ashes.

The Test started amid controversy following the omission of leading England batsman Len Hutton for performing poorly in the previous match. Having largely failed—apart from brief periods—to challenge Australia in the first two Tests, the hosts had made four changes to their team in an attempt to find a combination that could threaten the visitors' supremacy. Australia made their first change for the series, ending the Test career of veteran batsman Bill Brown after two poor matches. England captain Norman Yardley won the toss and elected to bat. Denis Compton left the field after being bloodied in the head by a Ray Lindwall bouncer. At this stage, the hosts were at 33/2 with an injured player, and they batted defensively for a period to try and regroup. Having received treatment, Compton returned with England in difficulty at 119/5 midway through the day and proceeded to score 145 not out, aided by several dropped catches, helping England to recover to 363 all out on the second afternoon.

Compton and seamer Alec Bedser were involved in a mix-up, resulting in the latter being run out and ending a 121-run partnership. Lindwall was the most successful bowler, taking 4/99. During the England innings, Australian opener Sid Barnes, who had gained much attention throughout the season for fielding at point-blank range in front of the batsman on strike, was hit in the ribs by a Dick Pollard pull shot and had to be carried from the ground and hospitalised. In reply, Australia batted steadily to be 126/3 by the end of the second day but then fell to 172/6—effectively seven wickets down with Barnes unable to bat after collapsing again—before evading the follow on by reaching 221. Australia scored slowly through the innings, finding the hosts' bowlers difficult to negotiate; Bedser took 4/81 and Pollard 3/53.

England began their second innings and were strongly placed on 174/3 at the end of the third day, an overall lead of 316 with seven wickets in hand. They had been aided by several dropped chances against Cyril Washbrook, who reached 85 by the close of play. However, rain meant that no play was possible on the fourth day and England did not have the opportunity to capitalise on their favourable position and set Australia a high runchase. Yardley declared on the final morning, but play did not start until mid-afternoon due to continuing inclement weather. The Australian batsman thereafter played for a draw; they batted slowly and reached 92/1 when stumps were drawn, not making an attempt to chase the 317 for victory. Arthur Morris made 54 not out, his second half-century of the match to go with his 51 in the first innings, registering Australia's top-score on both occasions. Although 30% of the playing time was lost to rain, the match still managed to set a record for the highest attendance at a Test match in England, surpassing the mark set in the previous Test.

== Background ==
Led by Donald Bradman, Australia had proceeded through the first two months of their 1948 England tour undefeated. After winning 10 of the 12 games before the Tests, eight of these by an innings, they won the First Test by eight wickets. Before the Second Test, they defeated Northamptonshire by an innings before drawing with Yorkshire. Bradman's men then crushed England by 409 runs in the Second Test at Lord's. Between Tests, they defeated Surrey by ten wickets and crushed Gloucestershire by an innings and 363 runs, having amassed 774/7 declared, their highest score of the season, and the second highest ever by an Australian team in England.

When the teams reconvened at Old Trafford for the Third Test, leading English batsman Len Hutton had been dropped. The reason was said to be Hutton's struggles with Lindwall's short-pitched bowling in the previous Test, during which he scored 20 and 13. Observers noticed Hutton backing away from the fast bowlers. The English selectors believed such a sight would have a negative effect on the rest of the side—which was not in good batting form—as it was a poor example from a key player. According to journalist and retired Australian Test leg spinner Bill O'Reilly, Hutton's second innings at Lord's had been the worst of his career and gave the impression he had been scared of the Australian pace attack. The omission generated considerable controversy, and pleased the Australians, who felt Hutton was England's best batsman, and thought he had been treated poorly by the selectors. Former Australian batsman Jack Fingleton pointed out that while Hutton had batted erratically and appeared uncomfortable in the previous Test, he also had a strong track record against the tourists, having made 52 and 64 for the Marylebone Cricket Club against Australia in the lead-up matches, and 94, 76 and 122 retired ill in his last three Test innings during the previous Ashes series of 1946–47. O'Reilly regarded Hutton's omission as punitive and vindictive. He said if Hutton needed to be shielded from the new ball attack, then England should have reshuffled their batting order to place their beleaguered opener down the order. O'Reilly said that as Hutton had a large range of attacking strokes, he was not a stereotypical, defensive opener who was mainly used to wear down the opening bowlers, and could be used in the middle order as an aggressor.

Hutton's opening position was taken by debutant George Emmett, who made 43 and nine for Gloucestershire in Australia's preceding tour match. In that match, two of Australia's leading pacemen, Keith Miller and Bill Johnston, did not bowl. Despite scoring 76 and 92 in the preceding match against Warwickshire, Emmett was not having a prolific season; he ended the summer with an average of 36.11.

England made three further changes. Spinner Jack Young and paceman Dick Pollard replaced the spin pair of Doug Wright and Jim Laker in the bowling department, meaning England would only play one slow bowler. Wright and Laker had struggled to penetrate the Australian batting lineup in the Second Test, taking match figures of 2/123 and 2/128 respectively. In contrast, Pollard had taken match figures of 4/85 for Lancashire in a match against Australia earlier in the season, and had taken 27 wickets in four county matches in the past fortnight. The selection was seen as being influenced by the fact the Test was being staged at Lancashire's home ground, where Pollard was familiar with the conditions, and the Australians had a high regard for him. In the month since being dropped for the Second Test in favour of Wright, after taking 1/107 in the First Test, Young had returned to play for Middlesex, taking 27 wickets in five matches. Alec Coxon, the Yorkshire allrounder who made his Test debut in the previous match at Lord's and opened the bowling, taking match figures of 3/172 and scoring 19 and a duck, was replaced by Jack Crapp, a debutant batsman. Crapp had scored 100 not out and 32 for Gloucestershire in the preceding match against the tourists. It was only the third century scored against Australia during the tour, and was part of a season in which Crapp had made four centuries and six half-centuries in 16 matches thus far. Coxon's omission was believed to have been caused more by off-field events than sporting merit. There was a story that he punched Denis Compton—whom he disliked and considered self-important—in the dressing room, but Coxon always denied this. However, there was certainly an altercation and Coxon was never selected again. O'Reilly interpreted the omission of the Yorkshiremen Hutton and Coxon at the expense of the Gloucestershire pair of Crapp and Emmett as symptoms of a regional bias in the English selection panel. He pointed out that only one of the four selectors—England captain Norman Yardley, who was also from Yorkshire—was from the north of the country.

Australia dropped Bill Brown, who had scored 73 runs at a batting average of 24.33 in three Test innings during the season. Brown was Australia's reserve opener, but Bradman opted to play him out of position in the middle-order, instead of using a specialist. Brown had also struggled in his unfamiliar position in the matches against Worcestershire and the Marylebone Cricket Club, scoring 25 and 26. According to O'Reilly, Brown had appeared out of place in the middle-order because he was used to the opener's classical role of defending against and wearing down the opening bowlers, rather than attacking. He was replaced by the all rounder Sam Loxton, who had hammered an unbeaten 159—including several sixes—against Gloucestershire, and that innings was particularly noted for his quick footwork, which he used to charge and attack the off spin of Tom Goddard.

== Scorecard ==
Umpires	(England) F Chester (England) D Davies
Toss	England elected to bat first
Result	Match drawn
Series impact	Australia leads 5-match series 2–0

=== England innings ===
England	First innings		Second innings	
Batsman	Method of dismissal	Runs	Method of dismissal	Runs
C. Washbrook	b Johnston	11	not out	85
G. M. Emmett	c Barnes b Lindwall	10	c Tallon b Lindwall	0
W. J. Edrich	c Tallon b Lindwall	32	run out	53
D. C. S. Compton	not out	145	c Miller b Toshack	0
J. F. Crapp	lbw b Lindwall	37	not out	19
H. E. Dollery	b Johnston	1		
* N. W. D. Yardley	c Johnson b Toshack	22		
+ T. G. Evans	c Johnston b Lindwall	34		
A. V. Bedser	run out	37		
R. Pollard	b Toshack	3		
J. A. Young	c Bradman b Johnston	4		
Extras		27		17
Total	(171.5 overs)	363	(69 overs)	174/3d

Australia	First innings				Second innings			
Bowler	Overs	Maidens	Runs	Wickets	Overs	Maidens	Runs	Wickets
R. R. Lindwall	40	8	99	4	14	4	37	1
W. A. Johnston	45.5	13	67	3	14	3	34	0
S. J. E. Loxton	7	0	18	0	8	2	29	0
E. R. H. Toshack	41	20	75	2	12	5	26	1
I. W. G. Johnson	38	16	77	0	7	3	16	0
K. R. Miller	–	–	–	–	14	7	15	0

=== Australia innings ===
Australia	First innings		Second innings	
Batsman	Method of dismissal	Runs	Method of dismissal	Runs
A. R. Morris	c Compton b Bedser	51	not out	54
I. W. G. Johnson	c Evans b Bedser	1	c Crapp b Young	6
* D. G. Bradman	lbw b Pollard	7	not out	30
A. L. Hassett	c Washbrook b Young	38		
K. R. Miller	lbw b Pollard	31		
S. G. Barnes	retired hurt	1		
S. J. E. Loxton	b Pollard	36		
+ D. Tallon	c Evans b Edrich	18		
R. R. Lindwall	c Washbrook b Bedser	23		
W. A. Johnston	c Crapp b Bedser	3		
E. R. H. Toshack	not out	0		
Extras		12		2
Total	(93 overs)	221	(61 overs)	92/1

England	First innings				Second innings			
Bowler	Overs	Maidens	Runs	Wickets	Overs	Maidens	Runs	Wickets
A. V. Bedser	36	12	81	4	19	12	27	0
R. Pollard	32	9	53	3	10	8	6	0
W. J. Edrich	7	3	27	1	2	0	8	0
N. W. D. Yardley	4	0	12	0	–	–	–	–
J. A. Young	14	5	36	1	21	12	31	1
D. C. S. Compton	–	–	–	–	9	3	18	0

== 8 July: Day One ==
The match started amid clear weather, a far cry from the previous Ashes Test at the ground in 1938, which was abandoned without a ball being bowled due to continuous rain for several days. The outfield was also smooth and green, a contrast to its state during World War II, when it was left cratered by German bombing raids. Yardley won the toss and elected to bat.

The change in England's opening pair did not result in an improvement on the scoreboard. A run out was narrowly avoided following a mix-up on the first ball, and Cyril Washbrook and Emmett appeared to be uncomfortable on a surface that offered early assistance to the bowlers. The Australians started with Ray Lindwall and Bill Johnston taking the new ball, but Bradman had misjudged the breeze and had to swap his bowlers' ends. For this purpose, Loxton bowled a solitary over. He was erratic in his length and bowled three long hops outside leg stump at the debutant Emmett, who ignored the opportunity to attack and let the balls pass. At the other end, Washbrook also played watchfully and avoided any horizontal bat shots, apart from a missed cut against Johnston's bowling. Overall, the English openers appeared comfortable in the first half-hour of play.

With 22 runs on the board after half an hour of play, Washbrook played around a yorker from Johnston and was bowled, much to the disappointment of his Lancashire home crowd. Johnston had been bowling from over the wicket, and his left-arm deliveries had generally been swinging back into the right-handed Washbrook. However, the opening batsman did not detect Johnston's variation ball, which was released from wide of the crease and angled across more sharply without curling back in. Washbrook played inside the line of the ball, which hit his stumps. Australia nearly had two wickets in the same over as the new batsman Bill Edrich struggled. He played loosely outside the off stump to the first ball but did not get an edge, and on the third delivery he faced from Johnston, Edrich survived again. Receiving a ball on middle and leg stump, he tried to defend it straight back down the pitch, rather than the conventional stroke to the leg side, and managed to edge the ball past the slips for four.

Six runs after the fall of Washbrook, the diminutive Emmett fended a rising ball from Lindwall to Sid Barnes at short leg, leaving England 28/2. Surprised by Lindwall's bouncer, Emmett took his eyes from the ball and fended with one hand on the horizontally-held bat, while ducking his head down below his arms. The ball bounced slowly off the pitch and after hitting Emmett's bat, rebounded gently up in the air for Barnes to collect. In Australia's match against Gloucestershire immediately preceding the Test, Lindwall bowled a bouncer to Emmett, who hesitantly parried it away for a single. Lindwall did not deliver any more bouncers to Emmett during the match, and O'Reilly thought the paceman was quietly waiting until the Tests to expose his opponent's weakness against the short ball. O'Reilly concluded that Australia's pace duo "had again disposed of the English opening batsmen with the minimum amount of effort."

Edrich eschewed attacking strokeplay as he and Denis Compton attempted to establish themselves. He was hurried by the pace of Lindwall and Johnston, making many last-moment movements to either hit the ball or withdraw from a shot.

Lindwall bowled a series of short balls. One hit Compton on the arm and the batsman attempted to hook another bouncer, but edged it into his face. Upon hearing the umpire's call of no-ball while the ball was travelling towards him, and knowing he was immune from dismissal, Compton decided to change his stroke. Having initially positioned himself to deflect the ball into the leg side, he then attempted to hook the ball, but could not readjust quickly enough. The velocity of the ball was such that it rebounded from his head and flew more than halfway to the boundary before landing. This forced Compton to leave the field with a bloodied eyebrow with the score at 33/2. After a ten-minute delay, Crapp strode to the centre for his debut innings, and he got off the mark from his first ball, gliding Lindwall past gully for a single. Lindwall then struck Edrich on the hand with another short ball, provoking angry heckling from spectators who compared him to Harold Larwood, a 1930s paceman who targeted batsmen with Bodyline, a strategy of intimidatory bowling. Edrich and Crapp then engaged in grim defensive play, resulting in one 25-minute period during which only one run was added, as England reached lunch with their total on 57/2. Edrich had made 14 from 90 minutes of batting, while Crapp had made 11 in 60 minutes. One of the motives of batting slowly without taking risks was to ensure the innings lasted long enough that it would still be in progress by the time Compton recovered from his concussion, so he could resume batting. Edrich appeared to be lacking in confidence due to his recent run of low scores, and thus hesitant to play with any attacking intent, whereas Crapp was usually circumspect. For a series of accurate overs from Ernie Toshack, Crapp repeatedly defended a sequence of deliveries to Arthur Morris at silly point. Toshack's first five overs were all maidens.

Upon the resumption, Crapp began to accelerate, hitting a six—which flew directly back over the bowler's head and over the sightscreen—and three driven boundaries from the off spin of Ian Johnson. This was a stark contrast to Johnson's first ten overs before lunch, which had yielded only seven runs. Crapp was eager to use his feet to get to the pitch of Johnson's deliveries, and subsequently dealt with the spin fairly comfortably, whereas many of his compatriots stood in their crease and found matters much more difficult. He then hit Toshack to Barnes at short leg, but the catch was dropped. However, Crapp did not capitalise as Toshack conceded only eight runs in a sequence of eight overs. Australia took the new ball with the score at 87 and Lindwall trapped Crapp—who did not offer a shot—leg before wicket for 37; the batsman misjudged the line of a straight ball and thought it had pitched and struck his leg outside off stump. Tom Dollery came in and took a single to get off the mark but then missed a Johnston yorker and was bowled. This dismissal mirrored that of Washbrook's in that Dollery failed to detect Johnston's variation ball, and thus played for swing when there was none. England had lost two wickets for one run to be 97/4. Captain Norman Yardley came in and played the fast bowling of Lindwall and Johnston with relative ease, retreating onto the back foot to allow himself more time to play his shots. Edrich was struck on the hand and Yardley edged to Keith Miller in the slips cordon on the half-volley.

After 170 minutes of slow batting, Edrich gloved a rising Lindwall delivery and was caught behind by wicket-keeper Don Tallon. At 119/5, Compton returned to the field, his head wound having been stitched to stop the bleeding. He and Yardley played carefully until the tea break, and only the England captain offered a chance; Barnes was unable to complete the reflex catch at short leg from the bowling of Toshack. After the resumption of play, Yardley on-drove Lindwall for a four, but lofted Ernie Toshack, who had been bowling leg theory, into the packed on-side where he was caught by Johnson at forward square leg. Toshack's defensive bowling had caused the English skipper to lose patience and his departure for 22 left the score on 141/6.

This brought wicket-keeper Godfrey Evans to the crease and exposed the hosts' lower-order. The last of the specialist batsmen, Compton nearly departed soon after when he leaned forward to a leg-side delivery from Johnson's off spin. He overbalanced and stumbled forwards, and Tallon removed the bails. There were no television replays to assist the umpires in those days, and although the attempted stumping appeared close to the naked eye, the benefit of the doubt was given to the batsman and the appeal rejected. Compton made use of this and attacked Toshack successfully, forcing Bradman to make a bowling change. In fading light, Compton combined with the gloveman to add 75 runs for the seventh wicket in 70 minutes, before Lindwall removed Evans—who attempted a wild slash—to leave England 216/7. Compton reached stumps on 64, accompanied by Alec Bedser, who was on four, as England ended the day at 231/7. Compton had been dropped one-handed on 50 by Tallon, before being missed on 64 by the wicket-keeper from the bowling of Johnston just before stumps.

== 9 July: Day Two ==
England resumed on the second day at 231/7 amid dark skies and the threat of rain; Australia was unable to break through despite taking the new ball. Bedser stubbornly defied the Australians, playing with a straight bat and stretching forward onto the front foot to block the ball. Tallon dropped Compton for the third time, off the bowling of Johnston when the batsman was on 73. Lindwall bowled well below his top pace in the morning session and the batsmen slowly accumulated their runs. Bedser was the more defensive of the two Englishmen, and Compton drove Toshack past mid on for a four to register his second century of the series, after 235 minutes of batting. Lindwall then beat Compton in each of his last three overs before lunch, but the Englishman survived. England reached lunch at 323/7 having added 92 runs without losing a wicket. Compton was on 123 and Bedser on 37, having brought up their century partnership. Five minutes were lost in the morning session when a stray dog invaded the playing arena and evaded policemen and a number of Australian fielders who attempted to catch it.

Immediately subsequent to the resumption, Compton took two boundaries from Lindwall's first over and another from Johnston's subsequent over. He then hit a ball into the covers and Bradman and Loxton collided in an attempt to prevent a run. Compton called Bedser through for a run on the misfield, but Loxton recovered and threw the ball to the wicket-keeper's end with Bedser a long way short of the crease. It ended an innings of 145 minutes, in which Bedser scored 37 and featured in a 121-run partnership with Compton. According to O'Reilly, it was the only mistake Compton made in his innings. The stand fell five runs short of England's highest Test partnership for the eighth wicket against Australia, a mark set by Patsy Hendren and Harold Larwood.

Pollard came to the crease and soon pulled a ball from Johnson into the ribs of Barnes, who was standing at short leg. Barnes stood closer than virtually all in that position, with one foot on the edge of the cut strip and he was unable to evade the ball. Barnes "dropped like a fallen tree", and had to be carried from the ground by four policemen and taken to hospital for an examination. Throughout the season, Barnes had received a mixed reception for his tactics; it was agreed they had a negative effect on the batsman, and there was a debate as to whether it was in the spirit of the rules. Compton hit two fours and Bradman responded by putting all of his men on the boundary to offer Compton a single so Pollard would be on strike and could be attacked. The Australia skipper then brought his men in close during the latter part of the over to prevent Compton from taking a single and regaining the strike for the following over. Compton was unable to farm the strike as he desired.

Toshack then bowled Pollard and Bradman caught Young from Johnston's bowling as England were dismissed for 363. Compton was unbeaten on 145 after 324 minutes of batting, having struck 16 fours. Lindwall took 4/99 and Johnston 3/67. Miller did not bowl, so the four remaining frontline bowlers sent down no less than 38 overs each.

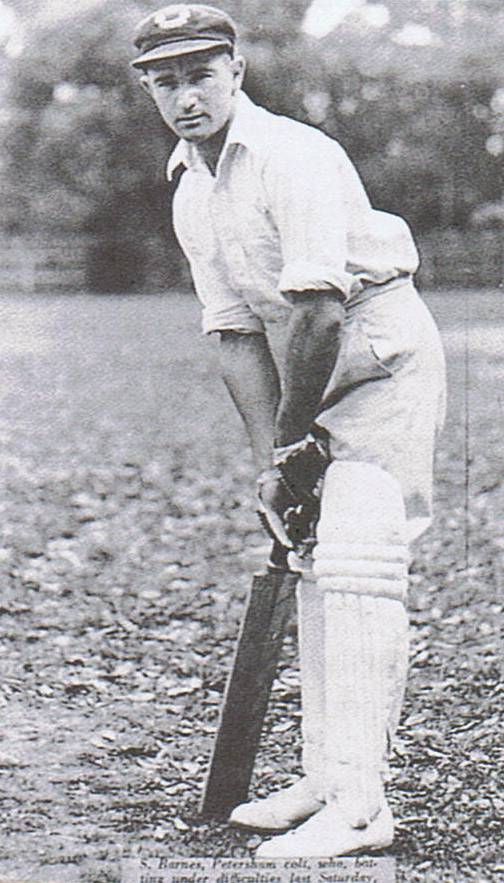
Barnes, pictured here in a photo at the age of 16, was taken to hospital after being hit in the ribs.

Australia came out to bat halfway through the middle session. Having dropped Brown, Barnes's injury left Australia with only Arthur Morris as a specialist opener. Johnson was thus deployed as Australia's makeshift second opener. He had never opened at Test level, but had once batted at No. 3 when used as a nightwatchman after the fall of the first wicket late on a day's play. He was unable to make an impact—Bedser removed him for one, caught by Evans at chest height off the inside edge from a ball that reared from the pitch. It was a difficult catch as Evans was standing up to the stumps and he had little time to react to the ball's change of direction. O'Reilly criticised the use of Johnson as an opener, as vice-captain Lindsay Hassett had transformed himself into a defensive batsman with little backlift and a guarded approach. Johnson's dismissal brought Bradman in to face the new ball. The Australian captain thus had to face Bedser, who had already dismissed him three times in the Tests with a new ball, and Pollard, who had troubled him in the match against Lancashire. Pollard then trapped Bradman lbw with an off cutter that struck the Australian captain on the back foot for seven to leave Australia in trouble at 13/2. This provoked a strong cheer from the crowd in support of Pollard, the Lancashire local. Australia were pinned down as Pollard bowled 17 consecutive overs from his long run, aiming for leg stump to stifle the scoring. He was partnered by Bedser, who bowled unchanged for 90 minutes.

Morris and vice-captain Lindsay Hassett rebuilt the innings, adding 69 for the third wicket in 101 minutes. They played sedately without trying to take risks. Hassett fell after being beaten in flight by Young. Aiming to break Young's restrictive leg side bowling, Hassett charged down the pitch and lofted a drive for four. However, in attempting a similar lofted drive over cover, he mishit the ball, which was caught by Washbrook at wide mid-off. Miller joined Morris and they took the score to 126/3 at stumps, with their personal tallies on 23 and 48 respectively. The run rate picked up in the last 50 minutes of the day as the pair added 44 runs; Miller was the more attacking of the Australian duo during this time.

== 10 July: Day Three ==
The weather was sunny on the third morning, and a large Saturday crowd had arrived from afar to watch proceedings; as a result, the gates were closed by 9:00 am with the ground already filled. The large gallery again encroached on the playing arena, which was not fenced. In the first hour, Australia struggled against the new ball. Miller was beaten three times in one over by Bedser before Pollard trapped him for 31, after Australia had added only nine runs in the first hour. Four runs later, Bedser removed Morris for 51, leaving Australia 139/5. It had been a slow morning for Morris, who took 21 minutes to add to his overnight total and reached his half-century 45 minutes into the day's play, having added only four runs to his overnight score. At the same time, Barnes had come out to bat upon Miller's dismissal, despite having collapsed while practising in the nets due to the aftereffects of his rib injury. He batted after refusing to stay in hospital and returning to the ground in spite of his bruised and discoloured ribs. He made a painful single in 25 minutes of batting before the injury became too much and he had to be taken from the ground with the assistance of Bradman among others, before being sent to hospital to be put under observation. Barnes would eventually miss two and a half weeks of cricket.

Tallon and Loxton added a further 33 before the former was caught behind from Edrich with the score at 172/6. Lindwall came into bat with Australia facing the prospect of the follow on. He received five consecutive bouncers from Edrich, one of which hit him in the hand and caused visible pain, evoking cheers from the home crowd. Loxton and Lindwall added a further 36 before the former was bowled by Pollard, leaving Australia 208/7, still five runs behind the follow-on mark. Johnston helped Lindwall advance Australia beyond the follow-on before Bedser removed both. Johnston was reprieved in his brief innings when he edged a delivery from Pollard in the direction of Edrich at first slip, but Evans dived across, trying to catch the ball in his right hand. The wicket-keeper could not hold on to the ball at full stretch, and the resulting deflection further to the right wrong-footed Edrich, who was moving the other way, and it went past him. From second slip, Crapp dived left behind Edrich but the ball landed a few centimetres beyond his fingers. However, in the next over Bedser, Johnston edged the ball in the same manner and Crapp caught the ball easily. Lindwall was the last man out for 23, while Toshack was unbeaten without scoring. Australia were thus bowled out for 221, giving England a lead of 142 runs. Bedser and Pollard were the most successful bowlers, taking 4/81 and 3/53 respectively.

At the start of England's second innings, Washbrook took a single from Lindwall, who then removed Emmett for a duck. The paceman pitched an outswinger on the off stump and Emmett edged it to wicket-keeper Tallon, who took it in his right hand while taking a dive.

Emmett's departure brought Lindwall's tormentor Edrich to the crease. Bradman advised his speedster not to bowl any bouncers at Edrich, fearing such actions would be interpreted as retaliation and provoke a negative media and crowd reaction. After not bowling in the first innings, Miller came on and immediately broke through Washbrook's defences, only to see the ball graze the stumps without dislodging the bails. Washbrook then drove Lindwall for four before Miller bounced him in the next over. After two Miller outswingers had evaded the outside edge of Washbrook, the batsman appeared unsettled. One bouncer was hit over square leg in an uncontrolled manner for a four, and another flew in the air, narrowly evading Loxton at fine leg. Lindwall followed Miller's lead towards Washbrook and was no-balled by umpire Davies for dragging his foot beyond the line. Following a disagreement, Davies threw Lindwall his jumper, but the matter faded away and the bowler was not no-balled again after discussing the matter with Bradman.

Lindwall then bounced Washbrook again and this time the England opener went for the hook shot. The ball flew high in the air straight towards Hassett at fine leg, who dropped the catch on his third juggled attempt. Having received a life on 21, Washbrook settled down as Loxton replaced Lindwall, while Johnson replaced Miller. Washbrook scored on both sides of the wicket and reached 50 in only 70 minutes as England proceeded to 80/1. Lindwall returned for a new spell and almost hit Washbrook in the head. After tea, Edrich hit Miller for four. Although Lindwall did not retaliate for the bouncers he received in the first innings, Miller did so with four consecutive short balls, earning the ire of the crowd. Miller struck Edrich on the body before Bradman intervened, ordered him to stop, and apologised to Edrich. Edrich and Washbrook settled and put together a 124-run partnership in only 138 minutes, England's largest of the series to that point. Edrich hit a four to long on, followed by a lofted off drive for six from the bowling of Toshack, generating momentum in their favour. However, Washbrook called Edrich through for a quick single soon after. The batsmen hesitated and after both Englishmen had paused in the middle of their run, Morris threw down Edrich's stumps from cover, ending the partnership at 125/2. Edrich had struck eight boundaries and a six in his 53.

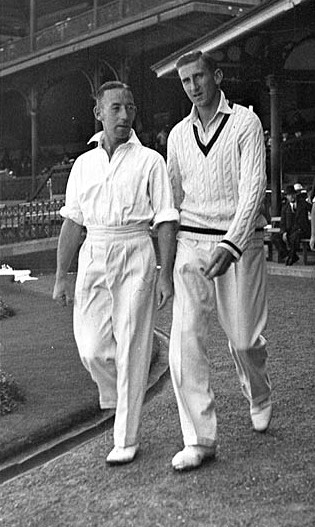
Hassett (pictured left in the late-1930s), dropped Washbrook twice on the third afternoon

Toshack then removed Compton for a duck, caught in the slips by Miller, leaving England three wickets down with the score still on 125. Crapp joined Washbrook and helped see off the new ball, stopping Australia's fightback as England reached 174 by the close without further loss. Washbrook was unbeaten on 85 and Crapp 19. England were 316 runs in front with two days of play remaining and seven wickets in hand. Their position was aided by the Australian fielders, who dropped Washbrook twice more. The Lancastrian was on 78 when he again hooked Lindwall to long leg and was again dropped by Hassett. The Australian vice-captain responded by borrowing a helmet from a nearby policeman to signify his need for protection from the ball, much to the amusement of the crowd. After adding two more runs, Washbrook was dropped in the slips cordon by Johnson from the bowling of Toshack. At the end of the day's play, Washbrook purchased a drink for Hassett in gratitude for the dropped catches.

== 13 July: Day Five ==
The rest day was followed by the fourth day, which was abandoned due to persistent rain. Despite this, 21,000 spectators came in anticipation of the weather clearing so that some play would be possible. However, a northeasterly depression from the Faroe Islands brought ongoing precipitation and prevented any play.

Yardley declared at the start of the fifth day after a pitch inspection, leaving Australia a victory target of 317, but the rain kept falling and the entire first session was abandoned. The umpires had decided to start play half an hour later than normal, but this was not possible and they helped the ground staff to clean up the wet surface. Bradman chose to use the light roller and play was supposed to begin as soon as the lunch break ended.

Further delay meant play began after the tea break, and the pitch played very slowly because of the excess moisture, which also caused there to be little bounce in the surface. With Australia not looking to chase the runs because the time available was not reasonable, Yardley often had seven men in close catching positions. In the first half-hour, Australia showed little attacking intent and scored only six runs. Young replaced Pollard and Johnson immediately swept him for four, before edging the next ball to Crapp, who completed the catch. Johnson fell for six to leave Australia at 10/1.

Bradman came in and played his first 11 balls from Young without scoring, while Morris hit two streaky shots for four from Bedser. Yardley used the spin of Young and Compton for an hour, while Morris and Bradman made little effort to score. For 105 minutes, Morris stayed at one end and Bradman at the other; neither looked to rotate the strike with singles. Bradman only played eight balls from Morris's main end, and at one point was so startled by his partner's desire for a single that he sent him back. The tourists thereafter batted in an unhurried and defensive manner to ensure a draw, which was sealed by a series of periodic rain interruptions. They ended on 92/1 from 61 overs, a run rate of 1.50, with 35 maidens. It was the slowest innings run rate to date in the series. Morris finished unbeaten on 54, his fourth consecutive half-century of the series. O'Reilly criticised the approach taken by the Australians in the closing stages of the match, attributing it to Bradman's orders. He said the pitch was made so tame by the heavy rain that they could have played in a natural and attractive manner to entertain the spectators, rather than defending carefully. He said Bradman's "unwillingness to take a risk or to accept the challenging call of some particular phase of the game is one of the greatest flaws" in his leadership.

The attendance of 133,740 exceeded the previous record for a Test in England, which was set in the preceding match at Lord's even though more than 30% of the playing time had been lost.

== Aftermath ==
After being aided by rain while in a disadvantageous position during the Third Test, the Australians had only one tour match—a victory over Middlesex—to prepare for the next Test at Headingley. Barnes was unable to recover from his injury in this short space of time, and was replaced by Neil Harvey. Instead of opting to use reserve opener Brown to replace Barnes, Australia played Hassett out of position to partner Morris, while Harvey took a middle-order slot.

For England's part, Washbrook's second innings half-century at Old Trafford, aided by multiple dropped catches, was regarded as a major factor in his retention for the Headingley match, having scored only 63 runs in the first five innings of the series. He was reunited with Hutton, whose controversial exile lasted only one Test before Emmett was dropped. Dollery, who had made only 38 in three innings in the Second and Third Tests, was replaced by all-rounder Ken Cranston. Despite being productive in domestic matches during the season, Cranston had struggled in his previous outings against the tourists. In two matches against Australia, he had managed only 47 runs in three innings and a total of 2/109.

Washbrook and Hutton put on 168 for the first wicket, the first time England had put on more than 42 for opening stand, as the hosts went on to make 496, their highest score for the series. Despite this, Australia's batsmen set a world record by chasing down 404 on the final day to win by seven wickets and take a series-winning 3–0 lead.

Following the historic win at Headingley, Australia had five tour matches before the final Test. They won three while two ended in rain-curtailed draws. During this period, Barnes returned to action after recuperating from his rib injury. Australia then completed the series in style with a convincing innings victory in the Fifth Test at The Oval to complete a 4–0 result. The Fifth Test was the last international match, and the tourists only had seven further matches to negotiate in order to fulfil Bradman's aim of going through the tour undefeated. Apart from two matches against the South of England and Leveson-Gower's XI, which were washed out after Australia had secured first innings leads of more than 200, Bradman's men had little difficulty, winning the remaining five fixtures by an innings. They thus became the first touring Test team to complete an English season undefeated, earning themselves the sobriquet The Invincibles.
