= Alan Cuff =

Australian cricketer

Alan Gordon Cuff
Personal information
- Born: 7 June 1908; Launceston, Tasmania, Australia
- Died: 23 April 1995 (aged 86); Launceston, Tasmania, Australia

Domestic team information
- Years: Team
- 1929/30: Tasmania
- Source: Cricinfo, 4 March 2016

Alan Gordon Cuff (7 June 1908 – 23 April 1995) was an Australian cricketer. He played one first-class match for Tasmania in 1929/30.

== Cricket career ==
Cuff was chosen to play for Tasmania in February 1930 at the MCG against Victoria. In his only first-class appearance he had a disappointing match being bowled by Schrader for five in the first innings and then bowled by Dick Hassett for eight in the second innings.

== Personal life ==
Cuff was born to Len Cuff and Ella Kathleen (née Maddox) in Launceston in 1908. He was educated at Launceston Church Grammar School and won the Richard Green Scholarship in 1924.

Cuff was a clerk at the Bank of Australasia in the early years of his working life.

He served in the Australian Army during World War II and was awarded an MBE on 18 February 1943 for distinguished service in the Middle East, particularly for his organisational skills at El Alamein headquarters.

After the war he returned to civilian life and after a few years became manager of a new ANZ branch in Hobart.

== See also ==
- List of Tasmanian representative cricketers
