= International cricket in 1953 =

International cricket season

The 1953 International cricket season was from April 1953 to August 1953.

== Season overview ==
International tours
Start date	Home team	Away team	Results [Matches]			
Start date	Home team	Away team	Test	ODI	FC	LA
11 June 1953	England	Australia	1–0 [5]	—	—	—
8 August 1953	Netherlands	Marylebone	—	—	0–0 [1]	—
13 August 1953	England	Netherlands	—	—	0–0 [1]	—

== June ==
=== Australia in England ===
The Ashes Test series
No.	Date	Home captain	Away captain	Venue	Result
Test 372	11–16 June	Leonard Hutton	Lindsay Hassett	Trent Bridge, Nottingham	Match drawn
Test 373	25–30 June	Leonard Hutton	Lindsay Hassett	Lord's, London	Match drawn
Test 374	9–14 July	Leonard Hutton	Lindsay Hassett	Old Trafford Cricket Ground, Manchester	Match drawn
Test 375	23–28 July	Leonard Hutton	Lindsay Hassett	Headingley Cricket Ground, Leeds	Match drawn
Test 376	15–19 August	Leonard Hutton	Lindsay Hassett	Kennington Oval, London	England by 8 wickets

== August ==
=== MCC in Netherlands ===
Two-day Match
No.	Date	Home captain	Away captain	Venue	Result
Match	8–9 August	Not mentioned	Not mentioned	Not mentioned	Match drawn

=== Netherlands in England ===
One-day Match
No.	Date	Home captain	Away captain	Venue	Result
Match	13 August	Viscount Cobham	Peter van Arkel	Hurlingham	Match drawn
