= International cricket in 1945 =

International cricket season

The 1945 International cricket season was from April 1945 to August 1945. No international tournaments were held due to Second World War.

== Season overview ==
International tours
Start date	Home team	Away team	Results [Matches]			
Start date	Home team	Away team	Test	ODI	FC	LA
19 May 1945	England	Australia	—	—	2–3 [6]	—
1 September 1945	England	New Zealand	—	—	1–0 [1]	—

== May ==
=== Australia Services in England ===
Three-day Match Series
No.	Date	Home captain	Away captain	Venue	Result
Match 1	19–22 May	Wally Hammond	Lindsay Hassett	Lord's, London	Australian Services by 6 wickets
Match 2	23–26 May	Wally Hammond	Lindsay Hassett	Bramall Lane, Sheffield	England by 41 runs
Match 3	14–17 June	Wally Hammond	Lindsay Hassett	Lord's, London	Australian Services by 4 wickets
Match 4	6–8 August	Wally Hammond	Lindsay Hassett	Lord's, London	Match drawn
Match 5	20–22 August	Wally Hammond	Lindsay Hassett	Old Trafford Cricket Ground, Manchester	England by 6 wickets

== September ==
=== New Zealand Services in England ===
Three-day Match
No.	Date	Home captain	Away captain	Venue	Result
Match	1–3 September	Brian Sellers	Ken James	North Marine Road Ground, Scarborough	HDG Leveson-Gower's XI by 8 wickets

== See also ==
- Cricket in World War II
