= Jack Crapp =

English cricketer

Personal information
- Full name: John Frederick Crapp
- Born: 14 October 1912; St Columb Major, Cornwall, England
- Died: 13 February 1981 (aged 68); Knowle, Bristol, England
- Batting: Left-handed
- Bowling: Slow left-arm orthodox

International information
- National side: England
- Test debut (cap 335): 8 July 1948 v Australia
- Last Test: 5 March 1949 v South Africa

Domestic team information
- Years: Team
- 1936–1956: Gloucestershire

Umpiring information
- Tests umpired: 4 (1964–1965)

Career statistics
Competition	Tests	First-class
Matches	7	452
Runs scored	319	23,615
Batting average	29.00	35.03
100s/50s	0/3	38/136
Top score	56	175
Balls bowled	–	460
Wickets	–	6
Bowling average	–	51.00
5 wickets in innings	–	0
10 wickets in match	–	0
Best bowling	–	3/24
Catches/stumpings	7/–	386/–
- Source: CricketArchive, 27 July 2016

John Frederick Crapp (14 October 1912 – 13 February 1981), was an English cricketer, who played first-class cricket for Gloucestershire between 1936 and 1956, and played for England on tour in the winter of 1948–49.

Cricket writer, Colin Bateman, noted that Crapp was a "sound rather than spectacular batsman who scored 1,000 runs in all but one of his fifteen seasons – that was 1954, when he struggled with the Gloucestershire captaincy". Crapp went on to become an umpire for twenty two seasons, including standing in four Test matches.

== Life and career ==
Crapp was born in St Columb Major, Cornwall, and began his career with Stapleton Cricket Club in Bristol, scoring a 'duck' for the third team on his debut. However, he soon moved up to the first XI following some spectacular performances, and was spotted by Wally Hammond who invited him for trials with Gloucestershire. In 1936, he made his debut for Gloucestershire and was a fixture in their team for the next twenty seasons, eventually becoming their captain.

Crapp was a dependable left-hand batsman and a fine slip fielder, who early in his career was thought of as a potential Test batsman. However, World War II intervened and it was not until 1948 that he became the first-ever Cornishman to play for England. Unfortunately for him, he came up against the Australian cricket team known as "The Invincibles". He was chosen on the strength of the Gloucestershire match against Australia, when Crapp scored 100, one of the few players to register a century against the Australians in 1948. Like many of the England players that summer, his performances did not do his talent justice.

He toured South Africa with the England team in 1948–49, but did not play spectacularly well in the Tests, although in the final Test he guided England home to victory with Allan Watkins, with only three balls to spare.

Crapp was dropped from the Test side in 1949. He continued to perform well for Gloucestershire, becoming their first professional captain in 1953. In 1955 he handed over the role to George Emmett. In his later years, a debilitating skin condition affected his hands and this eventually led to his retirement.

After retiring Crapp became a first-class umpire and stood in four Tests, notably the match in which Fred Trueman took his 300th Test wicket. For many years, Trueman would show people the ball he used to take the wicket. But shortly before his death, Crapp revealed to journalist, Frank Keating, that he had swapped balls preventing Trueman from keeping the historic one.

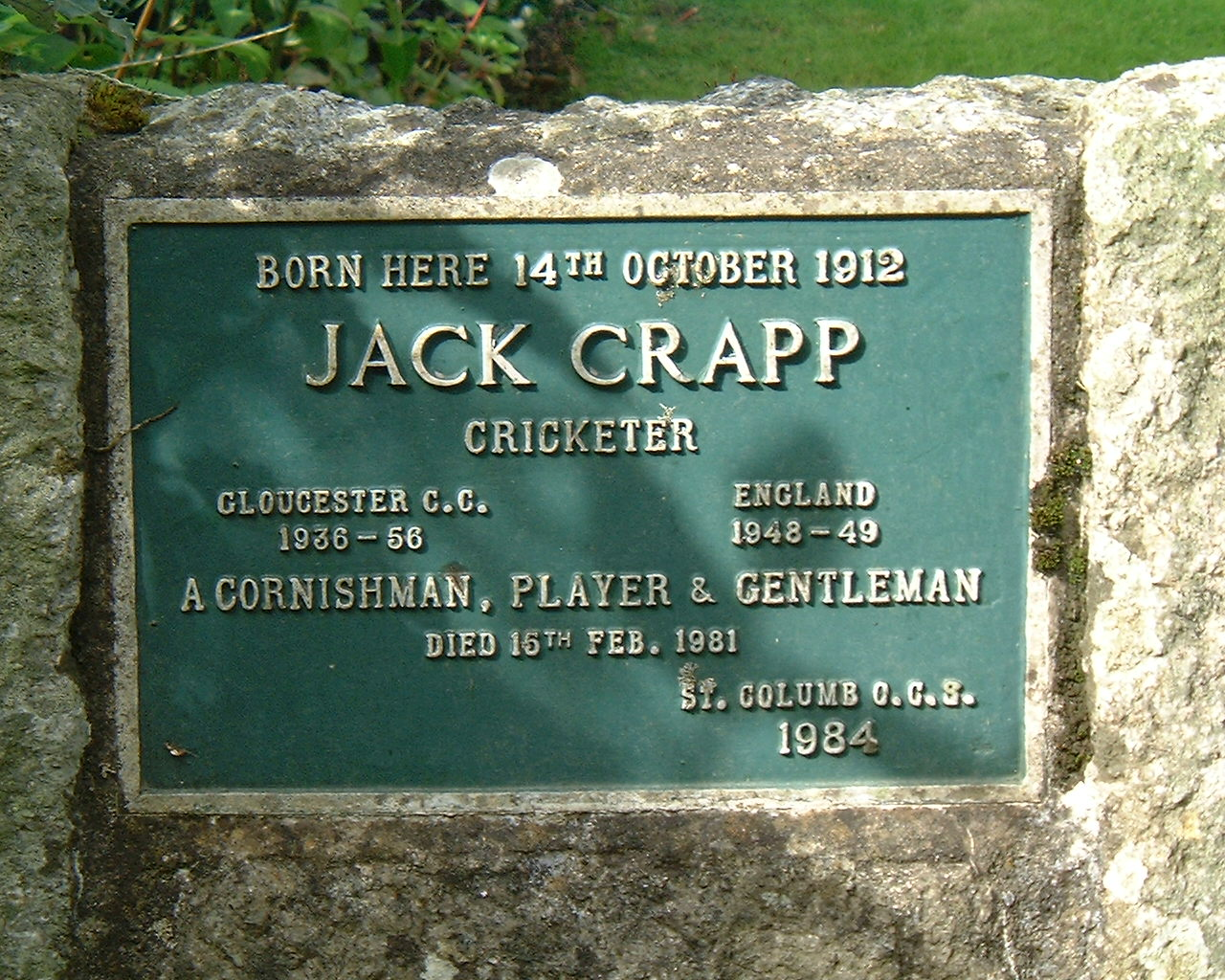
Commemorative plaque at birthplace of Jack Crapp

There is a story about a time he was sharing a room on tour with one of the Bedser twins. Returning to the hotel late one night, probably slightly worse for wear he approached reception to ask for his key. Now the touring England team were reported widely in the newspapers, and were recognisable to many people, and so he was not entirely surprised that before he could say anything the receptionist, asked "Bed, sir?" Jack replied, "No, Crapp", only for the receptionist to point him to the bathroom.

His England blazer is in the possession of St Columb Old Cornwall Society. There is also a plaque in the garden of house at Bridge, St Columb Major where he was born.

Jack Crapp died in Knowle, Bristol, at the age of 68.
