= 1948 English cricket season =

1948 was the 49th season of County Championship cricket in England. Don Bradman, who was shortly to retire, made his final appearance in England. Bradman's Australian team, which included Arthur Morris, a very young Neil Harvey, Ray Lindwall and Keith Miller, went through the tour without being beaten and became known to cricket's folklore as "The Invincibles". They won the Test series 4–0. Glamorgan won the County Championship for the first time under the dynamic captaincy of Wilf Wooller.

The season was preceded by the first publication of Playfair Cricket Annual which has become a mainstay among cricket publications. Playfair is a pocket guide (though in its early years it had a larger page size) providing a mass of potted information about the sport, and is seen by many fans as an essential accessory to watching cricket in England.

== Honours ==
- County Championship – Glamorgan
- Minor Counties Championship – Lancashire II
- Wisden (Wisden Cricketers of the Year 1949 for their deeds in the 1948 season) – Lindsay Hassett, Bill Johnston, Ray Lindwall, Arthur Morris, Don Tallon

== Test series ==
Australia's "Invincibles" defeated England 4–0 with the Third Test drawn. England's batting was strong on paper, the first four in the order generally being Len Hutton, Cyril Washbrook, Bill Edrich and Denis Compton. But they found the fast bowling trio of Lindwall, Miller and Johnston a handful, especially since the playing conditions that summer allowed a new ball to be taken after only 55 overs. England's bowling was largely reliant on Alec Bedser, and against such a strong Australian batting line-up even his average was unimpressive.

The first innings of the First Test set the pattern, with England only reaching as many as 165 thanks to 63 from Jim Laker at number 9. Johnston finished with 5/36. In reply, Bradman and Hassett both made centuries, and England had a deficit of 344. Assisted by an injury that prevented Lindwall from bowling, England made 441 in their second innings, thanks mainly to 184 by Compton, but Australia still won by 8 wickets.

Australia won at Lord's by 409 runs, with Morris making a century in the first innings and Sid Barnes one in the second, and none of the English team even reaching fifty in either innings. Lindwall took 5/70 in the first innings and Ernie Toshack had 5/40 in the second.

The Third Test was drawn, and England might have won had not the Manchester weather caused much time to be lost. In England's first innings Compton had to retire hurt early on after being hit on the head by Lindwall, and needed two stitches, but he returned to the crease at 119 for 5 and finished with 145 not out out of 363.

At Headingley, one of the most famous of all Tests was played. It was a high-scoring affair, with Washbrook and Edrich making hundreds in England's first innings, and Harvey – on his debut in Anglo-Australian Tests – making one for Australia. Early on the final day, with the pitch by now helping spin, England declared their second innings, setting Australia to make 404 in 344 minutes. Laker, not yet the force that he would be a few years later, bowled poorly, and there were many fielding lapses. Thus, against all expectation, Australia got the runs with 12 minutes and 7 wickets to spare, with Morris making 182 and Bradman 173 not out.

The final Test of the series was the biggest disaster of all for England. They lost by an innings and 149 runs. Batting first, England were shot out for 52, of which Hutton made 30. Lindwall took 6/20. The Australian openers put on 117, and the total eventually reached 389 (Morris 196). In their second effort England managed only 188. (Johnston 4/40). It was known that this would be Bradman's final Test, and the crowd gave him an ovation when he walked out to bat. He only needed four runs to average 100 in Test cricket, but Eric Hollies bowled him second ball for a duck.

Morris finished the series with 696 runs at 87.00, and Lindwall and Johnston each took 27 wickets. For England, the player emerging with most credit was Compton, with 562 runs at 62.44.

Cumulative record – Test wins	1876–1948
England	55
Australia	64
Drawn	34

== Leading batsmen ==
1948 English cricket season – leading batsmen by average
Name	Innings	Runs	Highest	Average	100s
Don Bradman	31	2428	187	89.92	11
Lindsay Hassett	27	1563	200*	74.42	7
Arthur Morris	29	1922	290	71.18	7
Cyril Washbrook	31	1900	200	70.37	7
Leonard Hutton	48	2654	176*	64.73	10
Denis Compton	47	2451	252*	61.27	9
Bill Brown	26	1448	200	57.92	8
Sam Loxton	22	973	159*	57.23	3
Sid Barnes	27	1354	176	56.41	3
Arthur Fagg	48	2423	203	53.84	8
Neil Harvey	27	1129	126	53.76	4
Jack Robertson	54	2366	154	50.34	7

1948 English cricket season – leading batsmen by aggregate
Name	Innings	Runs	Highest	Average	100s
Leonard Hutton	48	2654	176*	64.73	10
Denis Compton	47	2451	252*	61.27	9
Don Bradman	31	2428	187	89.92	11
Bill Edrich	55	2428	168*	49.55	8
Arthur Fagg	48	2423	203	53.84	8

== Leading bowlers ==
1948 English cricket season – leading bowlers by average
Name	Balls	Maidens	Runs	Wickets	Average
Johnnie Clay	1565	61	581	41	14.17
Ray Lindwall	3439	139	1349	86	15.68
Philip Whitcombe	2349	112	749	47	15.93
Bill Johnston	5101	279	1675	102	16.42
Cliff Gladwin	5729	266	2174	128	16.98
George Pope	4188	171	1724	100	17.24
Len Muncer	7736	381	2748	159	17.28

1948 English cricket season – leading bowlers by aggregate
Name	Balls	Maidens	Runs	Wickets	Average
Jack Walsh	7053	193	3405	174	19.56
Tom Pritchard	7629	276	3225	172	18.75
Len Muncer	7736	381	2748	159	17.28
Johnny Wardle	7702	484	2923	150	19.48
Eric Hollies	7620	357	2697	147	18.34

== Annual reviews ==
- Playfair Cricket Annual 1949
- Wisden Cricketers' Almanack 1949
