= John Shaw (Victoria cricketer) =

Australian cricketer (1931–2018)

- John Shaw in 1960

Personal information
- Full name: John Hilary Shaw
- Born: 18 October 1931; Geelong, Victoria, Australia
- Died: 5 August 2018 (aged 86); Drysdale, Victoria, Australia
- Batting: Right-handed
- Relatives: Lindsay Hassett (uncle); Dick Hassett (uncle)

Domestic team information
- Years: Team
- 1953–54 to 1960–61: Victoria

Career statistics
| Competition | First-class |
|---|---|
| Matches | 55 |
| Runs scored | 3,276 |
| Batting average | 40.44 |
| 100s/50s | 4/24 |
| Top score | 167 |
| Balls bowled | 46 |
| Wickets | 1 |
| Bowling average | 55.00 |
| 5 wickets in innings | 0 |
| 10 wickets in match | 0 |
| Best bowling | 1/2 |
| Catches/stumpings | 40/– |
- Source: CricInfo, 20 May 2015

John Hilary Shaw (18 October 1931 – 5 August 2018) was an Australian cricketer. He played first-class cricket for Victoria from 1953 to 1961. He toured New Zealand with the Australian team in 1959–60, but did not play Test cricket.

== Life and career ==
Shaw attended St Joseph's College, Geelong. Like his uncle, Lindsay Hassett, he played for South Melbourne Cricket Club, where he eventually made more than 5000 runs.

He made his first-class debut for Victoria against Tasmania in 1953–54 as a middle-order batsman. He established himself in the state team in 1955–56 as an opener, scoring 82, the highest score of the match, in Victoria's victory over Queensland in the first match of the season. However, he ducked into a delivery from Pat Crawford in the match against New South Wales in Sydney and was taken to hospital. He did not play again that season; his place in the team was taken by Bill Lawry, making his first-class debut.

He began the 1956–57 season with another score of 82, now batting at number three, and followed up in the next match with 114 at number five in an innings victory over South Australia. He made 508 runs at an average of 42.33 in 1956–57, the first of four consecutive seasons in which he made more than 500 runs. He was the second-highest scorer in the 1957–58 Sheffield Shield season, with 751 runs at 62.58. Wisden noted that he was a "plucky and resourceful batsman" and a brilliant catcher close to the wicket. He made 41 and 167, top-scoring in each innings, after New South Wales had scored 533 in the first innings of the Shield match at Sydney.

In 1958–59 he was less successful overall, but he scored 94 for Victoria against the English touring team. He scored 507 runs at 50.70 in the Shield in 1959–60, and was selected to tour New Zealand at the end of the season. The 14-man touring team excluded those players who had just returned from Australia's Test tour of India and Pakistan. Shaw top-scored with 120 in the first match of the tour, an innings victory over Auckland, and won a place in all the matches against New Zealand. He made 203 runs at 29.00 in the four matches, scoring 81 (Australia's top score in the match) and 26 in the second match, when he helped Australia avoid defeat.

He played for an Australian XI against the touring West Indians in November 1961 but was twice dismissed cheaply by Wes Hall. Later in the season, a ball from the West Australian pace bowler Des Hoare struck him on the head and he spent some time in hospital with bruising of the brain. He retired from first-class cricket before the 1961–62 season, citing the head injuries he had sustained while batting as the reason.

== See also ==
- List of Victoria first-class cricketers
