= Dick Hassett =

Australian cricketer

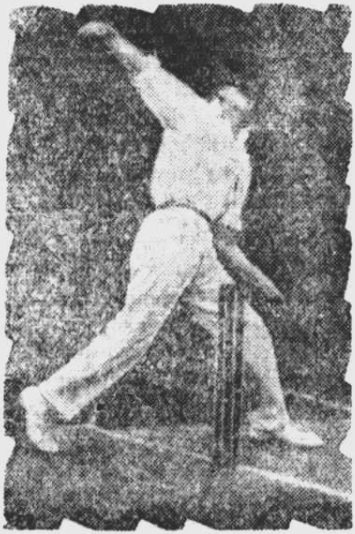

Personal information
- Full name: Richard Joseph Hassett
- Born: 7 September 1909; Geelong, Victoria
- Died: 15 November 2006 (aged 97); Melbourne
- Batting: Right-handed
- Bowling: Right-arm leg-spin
- Relatives: Lindsay Hassett (brother); John Shaw (nephew)

Domestic team information
- Years: Team
- 1929–30 to 1931–32: Victoria

Career statistics
Competition	First-class
Matches	8
Runs scored	397
Batting average	56.71
100s/50s	2/1
Top score	114 not out
Balls bowled	1272
Wickets	21
Bowling average	33.00
5 wickets in innings	0
10 wickets in match	0
Best bowling	4/50
Catches/stumpings	4/0
- Source: Cricket Archive, 15 May 2015

Richard Joseph Hassett (7 September 1909 – 15 November 2006) was a cricketer who played first-class cricket for Victoria from 1930 to 1932. He was the elder brother of Lindsay Hassett.

Born in Geelong, Dick Hassett went to The Geelong College with his brothers Harry, Vincent and Lindsay. In 1928–29 he played for a Geelong team against the touring Marylebone Cricket Club, taking the wicket of Jack Hobbs. A few weeks later, playing for Newtown & Chilwell in the semi-final of the Geelong competition, he took 9 for 16 and ran out the tenth batsman.

Along with three other young Victorians he made his first-class debut for Victoria in 1929–30 against Western Australia, taking four wickets and top-scoring in the first innings with 58. A month later he played against Tasmania, taking 3 for 27 and 4 for 50, getting the 15-year-old Jack Badcock stumped off his bowling in each innings on his first-class debut. Victoria won both matches.

Hassett's only match for a full-strength Victorian team came in 1930–31 against the touring West Indians. Victoria won again, but Hassett made a duck and took only one wicket. He played two matches against Tasmania later that season. In the first innings of the first match in Hobart, coming to the wicket at number eight with the score on 6 for 98, Hassett scored 114 not out, reaching his century in 138 minutes, and Victoria totalled 342. In the next match, in Launceston a few days later, he batted at number six and scored 102, reaching his century in 148 minutes, taking Victoria to a first-innings lead after Tasmania had made 446.

Despite his success in these two matches, Hassett never played a Sheffield Shield match. He played three times against Tasmania in 1931–32, with moderate success, and then devoted himself to his career. He worked as a chemical engineer, employed for 43 years by the clothing manufacturer Holeproof in Melbourne. For some years before his death at the age of 97 he was the oldest living Victorian player.

== See also ==
- List of Victoria first-class cricketers
