= Jack Young (cricketer) =

English cricketer

Personal information
- Full name: John Albert Young
- Born: 14 October 1912; Paddington, London, England
- Died: 5 February 1993 (aged 80); St. John's Wood, London, England
- Batting: Right-handed
- Bowling: Slow left-arm orthodox

International information
- National side: England
- Test debut: 26 July 1947 v South Africa
- Last Test: 25 June 1949 v New Zealand

Career statistics
Competition	Test	First-class
Matches	8	341
Runs scored	28	2,485
Batting average	5.59	8.93
100s/50s	0/0	0/1
Top score	10*	62
Balls bowled	2,368	78,965
Wickets	17	1,361
Bowling average	44.52	19.68
5 wickets in innings	0	82
10 wickets in match	0	17
Best bowling	3/65	9/55
Catches/stumpings	5/–	150/–
- Source: Cricinfo, 18 November 2022

John Albert Young (14 October 1912 – 5 February 1993) was an English cricketer, who played for Middlesex and England. His first-class cricket career lasted from 1933 to 1956.

The cricket writer, Colin Bateman, commented, "the son of a music hall comic, Jack Young was a theatrical performer and extremely popular with spectators".

== Life and career ==
Young was born in London, and was a slow left-arm spin bowler, who relied on accuracy and a flat delivery rather than flight. He was on the staff at Middlesex for much of the 1930s, but only came to the fore after World War II. In 1947, he took more than 150 wickets as Middlesex, led by the batting of Denis Compton, Bill Edrich and Jack Robertson, won the County Championship, and he repeated the feat two years later when the Championship was shared with Yorkshire. He also took more than 150 wickets in 1951 and 1952, so that, when he retired from injury after just three matches in the 1956 season, he had taken more than 1,300 wickets in ten seasons at an average of less than 20 runs per wicket.

Young played Test cricket for England eight times between 1947 and 1949, but took only 17 wickets in those games. Though his accuracy made him economical, and he bowled eleven consecutive maiden overs on his home Test debut at Trent Bridge against the 1948 Australians Don Bradman and Lindsay Hassett, then a world-record return, he appeared to lack the penetration to trouble the best batsmen. He was also perhaps unlucky in selection policies: in 1948, he played the first, third and fifth Tests and was omitted from the chosen 12 at Headingley, where the pitch for the fourth Test might have suited him better.

His tally of 1,182 wickets for Middlesex is bettered by only Fred Titmus and Jim Sims since World War II.
