= George Emmett =

English cricketer

Personal information
- Full name: George Malcolm Emmett
- Born: 2 December 1912; Agra, United Provinces of Agra and Oudh, British India
- Died: 18 December 1976 (aged 64); Knowle, Bristol, Somerset, England
- Batting: Right-handed
- Bowling: Slow left-arm orthodox

International information
- National side: England
- Only Test: 8 July 1948 v Australia

Career statistics
Competition	Test	First-class
Matches	1	509
Runs scored	10	25,602
Batting average	5.00	31.41
100s/50s	0/0	37/141
Top score	10	188
Balls bowled	–	3,964
Wickets	–	60
Bowling average	–	44.01
5 wickets in innings	–	2
10 wickets in match	–	0
Best bowling	–	6/137
Catches/stumpings	0/–	299/–
- Source: CricketArchive, 29 May 2020

George Malcolm Emmett (2 December 1912 – 18 December 1976) was an English cricketer, who played first-class cricket for Gloucestershire County Cricket Club. He also played one Test match for England in 1948.

== Life and career ==
George Malcolm Emmett was born in Agra, United Provinces of Agra and Oudh in British India in 1912. He started his cricket career in minor county cricket with Devon, before he moved to Gloucestershire to qualify to play for the county side by residency from 1936. He lost five years of his playing career as a result of World War II, but by 1947 Emmett was enjoying first-class success.

In 1948 he was picked to play for England, replacing Leonard Hutton at Old Trafford. Cricket writer, Colin Bateman, noted that it "caused something approaching national outrage". "It was not so much the choice of Emmett, a highly-rated attacking opening batsman, that caused the stir as the absence of the man he replaced". Emmett was caught for 10 in the first innings, and failed to score in the second. Hutton was restored to the side for the next encounter, and Emmett had no more international recognition.

Emmett stayed at Gloucestershire, playing with distinction, until 1959, and captained the county from 1955 to 1958. After retiring as a player he became a coach at Gloucestershire.

George Emmett died in Knowle, Bristol, in December 1976, at the age of 64.

== See also ==
- One Test Wonder
