= Lindsay Hassett =

Australian cricketer (1913–1993)

Lindsay Hassett MBE
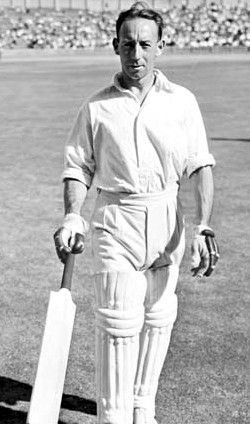
- Hassett in 1949

Personal information
- Full name: Arthur Lindsay Hassett
- Born: 28 August 1913; Geelong, Victoria, Australia
- Died: 16 June 1993 (aged 79); Batehaven, New South Wales, Australia
- Height: 168 cm (5 ft 6 in)
- Batting: Right-handed
- Bowling: Right-arm medium
- Role: Middle-order batsman
- Relatives: Dick Hassett (brother); John Shaw (nephew)

International information
- National side: Australia
- Test debut (cap 161): 10 June 1938 v England
- Last Test: 15 August 1953 v England

Domestic team information
- Years: Team
- 1932/33–1952/53: Victoria

Career statistics
Competition	Test	First-class
Matches	43	216
Runs scored	3,073	16,890
Batting average	46.56	58.24
100s/50s	10/11	59/75
Top score	198*	232
Balls bowled	111	1,316
Wickets	0	18
Bowling average	–	39.05
5 wickets in innings	–	0
10 wickets in match	–	0
Best bowling	–	2/10
Catches/stumpings	30/0	170/0
- Source: Cricinfo, 4 December 2007

Arthur Lindsay Hassett MBE (28 August 1913 – 16 June 1993) was an Australian cricketer who played for Victoria and the Australian national team. The diminutive Hassett was an elegant middle-order batsman, described by Wisden as, "... a master of nearly every stroke ... his superb timing, nimble footwork and strong wrists enabled him to make batting look a simple matter". His sporting career at school singled him out as a precocious talent, but he took a number of seasons to secure a regular place in first-class cricket and initially struggled to make large scores. Selected for the 1938 tour of England with only one first-class century to his name, Hassett established himself with three consecutive first-class tons at the start of the campaign. Although he struggled in the Tests, he played a crucial role in Australia's win in the Fourth Test, with a composed display in the run-chase which sealed the retention of the Ashes. Upon returning to Australia, he distinguished himself in domestic cricket with a series of high scores, becoming the only player to score two centuries in a match against Bill O'Reilly—widely regarded as the best bowler in the world.

However, the eruption of World War II interrupted Hassett's progress. With first-class cricket canceled, he enlisted in the Second Australian Imperial Force, serving in the Middle East and New Guinea before being chosen to captain the Australian Services cricket team that played the "Victory Tests" in England during the months immediately following Victory in Europe Day. Hassett was the only capped Test player in the team and his men unexpectedly drew the series 2–2 against an English team consisting of Test cricketers. Hassett's leadership was intrinsic to the success of the team, which toured and helped to re-establish the game in England, India and Australia in the aftermath of the war.

At the relatively advanced age at the time of 32, Hassett began his Test cricket career in earnest and became a more sedate, cautious player who often frustrated spectators with his slow scoring. From 1946–47 onwards, he served as Don Bradman's vice-captain for three series, including the Invincibles tour of England in 1948. He then succeeded the retired Bradman as Australian captain in 1949 and presided over a successful team that gradually aged and declined. After an unbeaten tour of South Africa that saw a 4–0 triumph in the Tests, Hassett led the Australians to 4–1 home win over England in the 1950–51 Ashes series. The solitary loss in the Fifth Test was the first Australian Test defeat since the resumption of cricket after World War II. Australia's dominance of world cricket waned and, in Hassett's final season at home in 1952–53, it drew 2–2 against a South African team that was expected to be weak opposition. In 24 Test matches as captain, Hassett oversaw 14 wins and suffered defeat only four times, but it was the last of the four losses that blighted his record.

In the 1953 New Year Honours, he was appointed Member of the Order of the British Empire (MBE).

Defeated in the last match of the 1953 series against England, Hassett's team lost The Ashes, ending Australia's 19-year ascendancy. At the age of 40, he promptly retired following a final testimonial match after returning to Australia. A cheerful character with a poker face that aided his captaincy, Hassett was known for his ability as an ambassador for Australia, his sense of humour and diplomatic skills. Richie Benaud wrote of him: "There are others who have made more runs and taken more wickets, but very few have ever got more out of a lifetime." In 2003, he was inducted into the Australian Cricket Hall of Fame by Cricket Australia.

== Early years ==
The youngest of nine children (six boys and three girls), Hassett was born on 28 August 1913 in Newtown, a suburb of Geelong, Victoria's second-largest city. His father Edward was a real estate agent who served as the secretary of the Geelong Permanent Building Society and was a keen club cricketer. The Hassett boys played three-a-side cricket matches in the backyard where Lindsay imitated his idol, the Test batsman Bill Ponsford. Along with two of his brothers, Lindsay attended Geelong College and made the First XI at the age of 14. During his five years in the team, he amassed 2,335 runs and was captain for three years. This total included an innings of 245 against Scotch College. In addition, he led the school's football team for three seasons and won the Victorian Public Schools singles championship at tennis. An elder brother, Richard, played for Victoria in the early 1930s as a leg spinner.

While still at school, Hassett played for the South Melbourne First XI in Melbourne's district cricket competition during the 1930–31 season. A month after his debut for South, he was selected for his first representative match; batting for the Victorian Country XI against the touring West Indies team, he scored 147 not out. After being overlooked for further state honours for a season, he made his first-class debut against South Australia in February 1933, but his highest score in four innings for the season was 12 and he aggregated only 25 runs. He was overlooked for the entirety of the next two seasons. Recalled in 1935–36, Hassett consolidated his place in the team through consistency rather than tall scores, scoring 212 runs at 30.28, including two fifties, 73 and 51.

The following season, he led Victoria's batting averages, scoring 503 runs at 71.85. Despite his success, Hassett was unable to register his maiden first-class century, although he did manage seven consecutive fifties in nine innings for the season, including a 93 against Queensland and 83 against arch-rivals New South Wales in a consistent run that helped Victoria to the Sheffield Shield title.

In 1937–38, Hassett made 693 first-class runs including a century and five fifties at an average of 53.30, including another 90 against Queensland. Despite having only one first-class century to his name, 127 not out against the touring New Zealanders at the MCG in the first match of the season, he "scraped" into Australia's team for the 1938 tour of England.

== Test debut ==
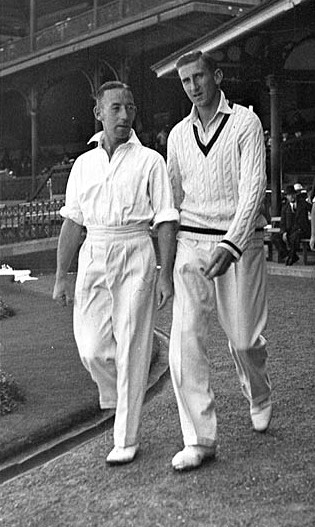
Hassett (left) with Ernie McCormick at the SCG in the late 1930s

Hassett allayed doubt about his selection when he began the tour with innings of 43, 146, 148 and 220 not out, against Worcestershire, Oxford University, Leicestershire and Cambridge University respectively as Australia won their first four matches by an innings. He added 57 and 98 in the next two matches against the Marylebone Cricket Club and Hampshire, and despite failing to pass 30 in the next four innings, he was selected to make his Test debut at Nottingham in the first match of the series. Hassett had an ignominious debut, scoring one and two in a high-scoring draw in which almost 1,500 runs were scored for the loss of only 24 wickets on a "batting paradise". He maintained his county form between Tests, adding 118 against Lancashire before scoring his only half-century in the Tests, adding 56 and 42 at Lord's in the drawn Second Test.

The Third Test was abandoned without a ball being bowled due to rain, and Hassett prepared for what would be the decisive Fourth Test by scoring 94 and 127 in consecutive matches against Yorkshire and Nottinghamshire. The match at Headingley in Leeds was Australia's only Test victory, which was enough to ensure a drawn series and the retention of The Ashes. In a low-scoring match in a batsman-friendly series, Australia, chasing a target of only 105 runs to win, had slumped to 3/50 when Hassett came to the crease as an approaching storm threatened to either end the game or make the pitch difficult to bat on. Hassett calmly hit 33 runs from 36 balls, to guide the tourists to a five-wicket victory, much to the relief of his captain Don Bradman, who was so nervous about the outcome that he could not watch the play. The innings earned Hassett a reputation of being calm under pressure, and Bradman later wrote that Hassett was a "masterful player" in a crisis.

After the match-winning innings, Hassett failed to pass 31 in his next six innings before Australia lost the Fifth Test by an innings and 579 runs, the heaviest defeat in Test history. He made 42 and 10 in the record-breaking match, and added a pair of half-centuries against Sussex thereafter. As he finished third in the batting averages for the tour, with 1,589 runs at 52.97, and the dry summer resulted in pitches mostly favourable to batting, Wisden found his Test performances, in which he made 199 runs at 24.88, anomalous:

Hassett, adding together the runs he made and the runs he saved, was one of the most useful men on the side. He never quite fulfilled the promise of a sensational start ... He appeared to make his strokes very late and, although adopting almost a two-eyed stance, had, so far as could be seen, no technical faults ... there was a good deal of surprise that he did not come off in the big matches although it must not be forgotten that his second innings at Leeds counted a lot in Australia's victory.

== Rivalry with O'Reilly ==
Benefiting from his experience in England, Hassett scored five centuries in his nine matches for 1938–39 and finished second in the first-class aggregates for the season. This included a run of seven matches in the middle of the season in which he scored five centuries and four fifties and ended the season with 967 runs at 74.38. He made 211 not out and 102 in two matches against South Australia, whose attack was led by Clarrie Grimmett, the world record holder for the most career Test wickets. Hassett also scored centuries in both matches against Queensland and another against Western Australia. In the first match against Queensland, he scored 104 in the first innings before adding 73 in the second innings to steer the Victorians to a narrow three-wicket victory.

This period of Hassett's career was notable for his battles with Australia's leading Test bowler, Bill O'Reilly, when the latter appeared for New South Wales (NSW). O'Reilly conceded that Hassett played his bowling better than any other batsman. Hassett's method was predicated on counter-attacking: whenever O'Reilly bowled his famed wrong 'un, he could read this delivery in its flight (whereas most other batsmen could not) and he advanced down the pitch to hit the ball over the fielders on the leg side. The disparate demeanours and physiques of the two men accentuated their rivalry. Ray Robinson wrote that O'Reilly, "... towered nine inches above him; it would have looked more apt for Hassett to sell him a newspaper than contend with his bowling." The phlegmatic Hassett sometimes goaded the irascible O'Reilly, which few batsmen were game to do. On one occasion, he repeatedly mis-hit O'Reilly's bowling, prompting an irritated O'Reilly to ask if he had a middle to his bat. Hassett replied, "I don't need one with you, Tige." It was a long, defensive innings of 81 against NSW (including O'Reilly) in 1937 that first brought Hassett to the attention of the national selectors. During an interval in the match, O'Reilly told his teammates: "Nobody has ever kept me out like that little bastard."

In the 1938–39 season, O’Reilly removed Hassett twice in three innings in matches between the two states. Their rivalry culminated in two encounters on the SCG at the conclusion of the 1939–40 season. The first, between Victoria and NSW, effectively decided the winner of the Sheffield Shield; Victoria had won the first match between the two teams for the season. By scoring 122 in both innings, Hassett became the only player to score two centuries in a match against a team containing O'Reilly. Nevertheless, NSW won the game and the shield, before playing against a Rest of Australia combination. Batting for the Rest of Australia, Hassett almost repeated his feat by making 136 and 75, but this was not enough to stop NSW, who demonstrated their strength with another victory. Hassett had scored five half-centuries in the five preceding matches of the season, including three in four innings against Grimmett's South Australia, and ended the Australian summer with 897 runs at 74.75. He lost his wicket to O'Reilly in a first-class match only three times.

== War years and the Services team ==
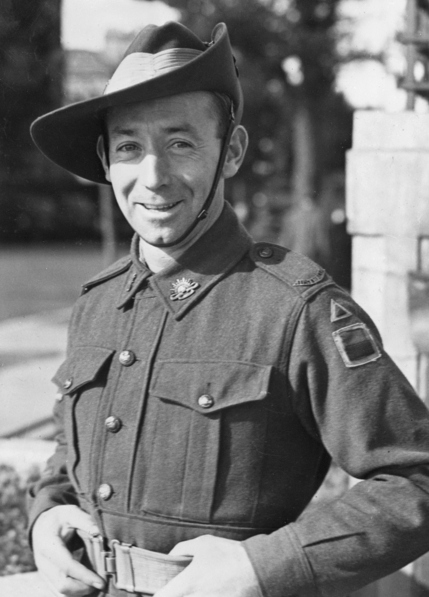
Hassett during the Second World War

On 23 September 1940, Hassett enlisted in the Second Australian Imperial Force (AIF); despite his enlistment he remained active in cricket and played four first-class matches in the following 1940–41 season, scoring 384 runs at 54.86 including a century against South Australia, before his posting to the Middle East in early 1941. As a member of the 2/2nd Heavy Anti-Aircraft Regiment, attached to the Australian 7th Division, he was stationed at Haifa in the British Mandate of Palestine (now Israel). During his time in the army, Hassett became popular among his colleagues because of his "blithe spirit". He was offered a commission as an officer, but declined. Hassett maintained his connection to cricket by captaining an AIF team against service teams from other Empire countries serving in the region, playing matches in Egypt and Palestine. Following the outbreak of war in the Pacific, the Australian 6th and 7th Divisions were recalled to Australia. He married during his brief return to Melbourne in May 1942, before his unit was deployed to Port Moresby in New Guinea to fight against Imperial Japan.

In 1945, with the cessation of hostilities in Europe, Hassett was selected to lead the Australian Services cricket team on a tour of England. Officially a military unit, the team's commanding officer was Squadron Leader Stan Sismey of the Royal Australian Air Force, although Hassett was the on-field captain. They went on to play 64 matches in nine months of cricket in four countries. The focal point of the campaign was a series of matches against England known as the "Victory Tests", which began in May. Australian cricket administrators would not accredit the three-day matches as official Test matches, arguing that there were not enough Test-level players among the servicemen; Hassett was the only player who had Test experience, and only nine others had played first-class cricket. As a result, Australia were not expected to be able to seriously challenge the hosts, who had many of their pre-war Test players.

The Victory Tests were expected to usher in a new post-war era, which it hoped would be more aggressive and attractive. The last Anglo-Australian Test series before the war had featured a large number of draws due to defensive play. Australia unexpectedly drew the series 2–2, and Hassett wrote at the end of the series that "This is cricket as it should be ... These games have shown that international cricket can be played as between real friends—so let's have no more talk of "war" in cricket". The series was regarded as an outstanding success, with a total attendance of 367,000 watching the bright and attacking play. In the five Victory Tests, Hassett made 277 runs at 27.70, including two fifties. The Services and Australian Imperial Force teams played separate matches in England during the season, which lasted until September, although only one other Services match was given first-class status. Hassett scored three centuries in matches for the Services.

Due to the unexpectedly strong success of the Victory Tests, the government of Australia ordered the team to delay their demobilisation. With the team raising so much money for war charities, the government directed them to travel home via India and Ceylon for further fundraising matches for the Red Cross.

Hassett enjoyed greater success on the Services tour of India, although the Australians had little to celebrate as a team. It was a tougher proposition for Hassett's men, as all but one of the nine matches were against first-class opposition, and many of the players regarded the local umpires as being deliberately biased in favour of the home teams. After arriving in October, conflict hit the team after a series of ineffective displays. The team, mostly made up of RAAF personnel, had been ill with food poisoning and dysentery, and travelled across the Indian subcontinent via long and bumpy train journeys for the first month. The airmen wanted to travel by air, and tried to ask Hassett and manager Keith Johnson for air travel. When this was refused, they threatened to abandon the tour or replace infantryman Hassett with either Keith Carmody or Keith Miller—who were RAAF fighter pilots—if their wish was not granted. With incumbent Australian captain Bradman likely to miss the upcoming tour of New Zealand, the Services leader would be one of the frontrunners for the national captaincy. Miller refused to plot against Hassett and the dispute ended when Sismey arranged for a RAAF plane already in India to transport the team; after a month in India, their first flight came in late November.

In the opening match of the tour, a draw against North Zone, Hassett made 73. In a high-scoring match in hot conditions against the Prince's XI in Delhi, he struck 187 and 124 not out in Australia's 8/424 declared and 5/304. The team was scheduled to play East Zone in Calcutta, but the city was gripped in deadly riots as independence activists agitated against British rule. Australia batted first and made only 107, before East Zone replied with 131. Led by Hassett's 125, Australia posted 304 to leave the hosts a target of 281. On the final day, pro-independence rioters broke through the security presence and invaded the pitch for the second time during the match, while East Zone were batting. East Zone batsman Denis Compton told the rioters to talk to Hassett, saying that the Australian skipper controlled proceedings. Hassett smiled at the leader of the irate demonstrators and asked "You wouldn't happen to have a cigarette, would you, old boy?" The rioters calmed down and play resumed.

Australia struggled in the three representative matches against India. Hassett made 53 in the first match in Mumbai, and although the Australians took a 192-run first innings lead, the hosts managed to hold on for a draw. The second match in Calcutta was an evenly-contested draw, before India won the deciding match. Hassett top-scored with 143 in Australia's 339, but the hosts took a first innings lead of 186 to set up a six-wicket win. Hassett ended with 235 runs at 47.00 in the three international matches, but did not taste victory in any of his seven matches on Indian soil. He scored 57 as Australia defeated Ceylon by an innings in Colombo before returning to Australia mid December. As time had passed, the players had become increasingly tired by the long campaign, and morale began to drop as they waited for their return to their families and civilian life.

== Post-war career ==
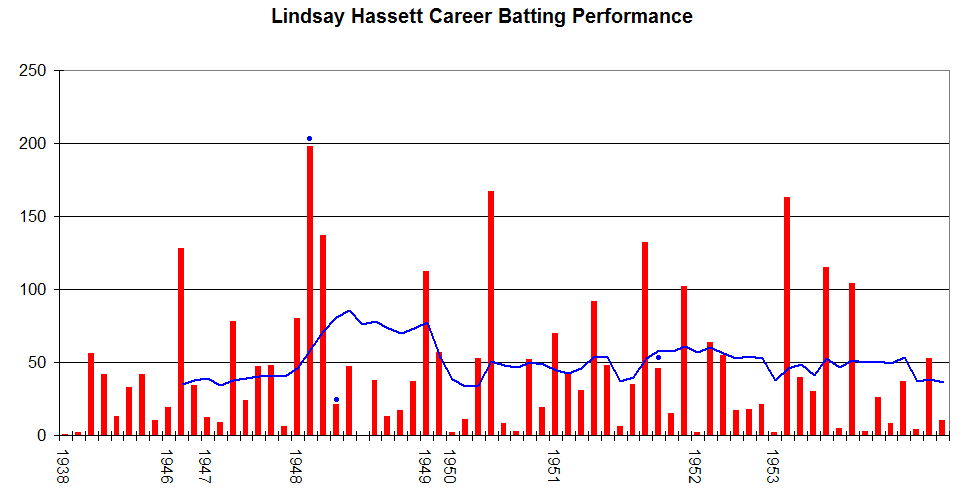
Lindsay Hassett's Test career batting performance graph. The red bars indicate the runs scored by Hassett in each innings and the blue lines are the averages of the ten more recent innings. Innings in which Hassett finished not out have a blue dot above the red column

Johnson's team arrived in Australia late in 1945, but the armed services and Australian Board of Control ordered them to play another series against the various Australian states. The fixtures were meant to revive cricket following the war and were also used as a lead-up to the international tour to New Zealand in March 1946. As a result, Hassett could not appear for Victoria during the 1945–46 season. The Services performed poorly; after playing consecutive draws against Western Australia and South Australia, they were crushed by an innings by both Victoria and New South Wales, before drawing against Queensland and Tasmania, the smallest state. Hassett's team was saved by the clock against Queensland when the time ran out with the hosts four runs short of their target, but their fortunes were reversed in the final match when Tasmania hung on with only one wicket in hand to salvage a draw.

Hassett ended the Australian summer with 312 runs at 39.00, including three fifties. During the entire Services campaign, he scored 1,434 runs at 49.44 in 18 first-class matches and top-scored for the Australians’ whole campaign with 187. His aggregate was only 13 behind that of all rounder Keith Miller.

Based on his form for the Services, Hassett was selected in the Australian team for a brief five-match tour of New Zealand in February and March 1946. As the military men played poorly in Australia, the national selectors concluded that their achievements against England must have been against weak opposition, and only Hassett and Miller were selected for the Australian tour of New Zealand.

Despite speculation that he would lead the team, as Bradman had made himself unavailable due to concerns over fitness and his ability to play at his pre-war world-leading standards, the Australian Board of Control appointed Bill Brown as captain and O'Reilly as Brown's deputy. In the Board's ballot for the leadership positions, Hassett received only one of the 13 votes, although it was enough to make him the third on-tour selector. One motive speculated for his being overlooked was that he had rested himself from the match against Victoria because he was tired of the long periods in the military away from his family and decided instead to spend the time in Melbourne with his wife and young daughter; this supposedly drew the ire of the Victorian Cricket Association.

On the tour, Hassett made first-class centuries against Auckland (121) and Wellington (143) and scored 19 in the one-off match against New Zealand—retrospectively accredited as a Test—played at Basin Reserve in Wellington on a poor rain-affected pitch that saw the contest finished within two days. The match ended in an easy victory for Australia when New Zealand was bowled out for 42 and 54, but the tour attracted big crowds and made a record profit. Hassett scored 351 runs at 70.20 for the whole tour. By the time he returned home from the tour, Hassett had played cricket continuously for almost twelve months.

=== Sheet anchor role ===
The following season, Hassett returned to serve his state and became Victorian captain for the first time. In the warm-up matches ahead of the Tests, he hit 57, 57 and 28 against the touring MCC team. He then scored 114 and 36 not out against South Australia in his last match before the beginning of the Ashes series. After a long deliberation, and against medical advice, the 38-year-old Bradman decided to resume as Test captain. As Brown was injured and O'Reilly had retired, Hassett was appointed vice-captain. The First Test at Brisbane revealed a more circumspect Hassett. He made 128 (from 395 balls in 392 minutes), his maiden Test century, and shared a 276-run partnership with Bradman, the cornerstone of Australia's match-winning score of 645. Although the crowd continually barracked Hassett for his slow scoring, Ray Robinson felt that he played a crucial "anchoring" role in support of Bradman, who initially struggled with his timing, controversially survived an appeal for a catch by Jack Ikin, then limped through the latter stages of his innings with a strained muscle. Hassett later joked that one of his brothers had his wedding on the day, and was waiting for the batting to finish before starting the ceremony, but could wait no more and proceeded, only to come back after the marriage had been completed to find that just one run had been scored in the intervening period and that his brother was still only on 97.

Australia went on to start the post-war Ashes era with a crushing win by an innings and 332 runs. Hassett made 34 as Australia won the Second Test by an innings, and the Third Test was his first Test on his home ground at the MCG. He made only 12 and 9 as England held on for a draw with three wickets in hand.

Hassett's other major innings of the series was 78 from 227 balls in the drawn Fourth Test at Adelaide. He added 189 runs with Arthur Morris after Australia, in reply to England's first innings of 460, were 2/18. At one point, the umpire denied an appeal by Norman Yardley for lbw against Hassett, prompting a frustrated Neville Cardus to write, "... he deserved to be [given out]; the sight of a cricketer of his gifts continuing to deny his eye and technique in a Test match was enough to make any umpire go mad and, like the judge in Chesterton's story, administer justice instead of law." Hassett ended the Tests with 47 in the second innings as Australia stumbled to a five-wicket win on a deteriorating and spinning pitch in the Fifth Test in Sydney, in pursuit of 214. He finished the series with 332 runs at 47.43 and had difficulty against the leg spinner Doug Wright, who dismissed him five times in seven innings. He had added 126 for Victoria against Wally Hammond’s Englishmen just a week earlier.

Despite his slow scoring in the Tests, Hassett was dynamic in the Shield matches for Victoria. In two matches for Victoria between the Third and Fourth Tests, Hassett hit 200 against Queensland and 190 against NSW; in both innings he scored at a rate of almost 50 runs per hour. Victoria won both their matches against arch-rivals NSW convincingly, by an innings and 288 runs respectively, and won the Sheffield Shield, having secured victory in each of the four matches that Hassett played in. Hassett was highly productive throughout the whole season, ending with 1,213 runs at 71.35.

India embarked on its first tour of Australia in the summer of 1947–48, and the hosts won the first series between the two countries 4–0. After failing to pass 50 in the first two Tests, Hassett hit 80 in a rain-affected Third Test win, and then his highest Test score, 198 not out in an innings win in the Fourth Test in Adelaide, finishing the series with 332 runs at 110.67. Hassett was rested from the Fifth and final Test as Australia sought to try out new players such as Sam Loxton ahead of the tour of England. He remained in strong form for Victoria, scoring 118 and 204 against South Australia and Queensland respectively, but his state were unable to retain their title, losing three and winning two matches when Hassett was available. He ended the season with 893 runs at 68.69.

=== Invincibles tour ===
Ten years after his first tour of England, Hassett was included in the 1948 team as Bradman's deputy. Hassett was one of three on-tour selectors along with Bradman and Arthur Morris. Considered one of the strongest Australia teams to tour England, the team became known as The Invincibles because it went undefeated through 34 matches, an unprecedented feat. As matches often started the day after the previous fixture, Australia employed a rotation policy and Hassett led the tourists in nine of the 34 matches while Bradman was rested. Under Hassett's watch, Australia won seven matches, five of these by an innings, while both draws were rain-affected fixtures in which more than half the playing time was lost.

Hassett had two close encounters as captain, both on damp pitches before the First Test when Australia's unbeaten record was challenged. Against Yorkshire in the third match of the tour, Australia came the closest to losing for the entire tour. In a low-scoring match in which neither team posted more than 101, Australia was set 60 for victory, Hassett elected not to ask for the pitch to be rolled. Former Australian Test batsman Jack Fingleton said that Hassett "might have made an initial mistake in not having the pitch rolled because whenever there was rain about in England the heavy roller seemed to knock any nonsense [erratic bounce and sideways movement] out of the pitch". Australia lost quick wickets and Hassett came in with the score at 2/5. After being involved in a run out, he fell to leave Australia at 5/20. Australia lost another wicket to be 6/31, effectively seven down with Sam Loxton incapacitated by injury, but scraped hom without further loss after both batsmen at the crease were dropped. It would have been their first defeat against an English county since 1912. In the 11th match of the tour against Hampshire, Australia ceded a first innings lead for the first time on tour. On a drying pitch, Australia were dismissed for 117 in reply to the home side's 195. Australia had made a solid start, before Hassett fell for 26, sparking a collapse of 8/47 to be all out for 117. Hampshire were then bowled out for 103, leaving Australia a target of 182, which they reached to seal an eight-wicket win.

The two matches aside, Hassett had a productive lead-in to the Tests, scoring 110 against Surrey and two fifties. One of these came in a match against the Marylebone Cricket Club (MCC) at Lord's. The MCC fielded seven players who would represent England in the Tests, and was basically a full-strength Test team. It was a chance to gain a psychological advantage before the Tests. Australia batted first and Hassett made 51 in an innings win. Fingleton hailed Hassett's display as "the prettiest half century we saw in the whole summer. There was not effort in his play. The ball sped quietly and quickly in all directions."

In the First Test at Trent Bridge, Hassett came in on the second day with Australia at 4/185 in reply to England's 165. Australia had been scoring slowly due to England's use of leg theory. Hassett almost holed out early when he edged a ball just wide of the wicket-keeper. Hassett and Bradman were heckled for their slow batting but they remained unhurried in the face of England's stifling tactics Australia had plenty of time after bowling out their opponents easily. Hassett had a period of 20 minutes without scoring.

Early on the third day, Bradman fell for 138 with the score at 5/305. Yardley again pinned Hassett down with more leg theory. Laker bowled with one slip, while Young had none and employed a pure ring field. The scoring was slow during this passage of play—Young delivered 11 consecutive maiden overs and his 26-over spell conceded only 14 runs. The injured Ray Lindwall came out to join Hassett at 7/365 without a runner. Hassett—who had scored only 30 runs in the first 75 minutes of the morning—swept Laker for four and then hit him for the first six of the match. Hassett added 53 in the two hours of the morning session to reach lunch at 94. Australia were unhurried and remained patient in the face of Yardley's defensive tactics because they had bowled England out on the first day and there was still sufficient time to force a result. After the break, Hassett reached his first Test century on English soil. from 305 minutes. He then accelerated, adding a further 37 runs in 49 minutes, before being bowled by Bedser, having struck 20 fours and a six. This ended an eighth-wicket partnership of 107 with Lindwall with the score at 8/473; Australia ended at 509 to take a 344-run first innings lead. In the second innings, Hassett hit the winning run to end with an unbeaten 21 in an eight-wicket win.

The First Test set the tone for the series, and ahead of the next Test, Hassett top scored with 127 and took five catches in an innings win over Northamptonshire. Hassett scored 47 and a duck in the Second Test at Lord's, having been dropped three times in the first innings as Australia went on to a 409-run win. Hassett then struck 139 against Surrey, his second century against the county in as many matches. Hassett and Australia were in difficulty in the Third Test at Old Trafford. Hassett made 38 as Australia scored 221 in reply to 363. In England's second innings, Hassett twice dropped Cyril Washbrook in the same position from the same shot. After the third day's play, Washbrook shouted Hassett a drink; England were in a strong position, 316 runs ahead with seven wickets in hand. Luckily for Australia and Hassett, the pair of missed chances from the England opener late in the day cost little. Washbrook remained unbeaten on 85 as England declared without further addition after the entire fourth day and the final morning had been lost to rain. Hassett was not required as Australia batted for 61 overs to ensure a draw.

Hassett had a new role as the teams headed to Headingley for the Fourth Test. He would improvise and open with Morris, as regular opener Sid Barnes was injured. Hassett dropped Len Hutton—who went on to score 81—on 25. Hassett struggled to make an impact in the unfamiliar role, scoring 13 and 17. However, the other Australian batsmen stepped up and scored 3/404 in 330 minutes on the final day to set a new world record for the highest successful Test runchase, ensuring an unassailable 3–0 series lead. Hassett scored two fifties in the lead-up to the Fifth Test, where he returned to his customary role with the return of Barnes. Hassett took a diving catch in the first innings and scored 37 in an innings win. Australia thus won the series convincingly 4–0 and Hassett finished the series with 310 runs at 44.29.

After the Tests, seven matches remained on Bradman's quest to go through a tour of England without defeat. played in four of the matches and was in fine form, hitting three consecutive centuries. Against the Gentlemen of England at Lord's, Hassett made 200 not out against a team that featured eight Test players. He then made 103 against Somerset and 151 against the South of England. Australia won the first two and were denied by rain in the third.

Hassett ended the first-class matches with 1,563 runs at 74.22 and seven centuries. He had the third highest aggregate behind Bradman and Morris and the second highest average. In recognition of his performances in England, he was named one of the five Wisden Cricketers of the Year in 1949. Wisden opined that "in addition to his playing ability Hassett's cheerfulness and leadership, which extended to off-the-field relaxation as well as in the more exacting part of the programme, combined to make him an ideal vice-captain able to lift a considerable load off Bradman's busy shoulders".

=== Captain of Australia ===
By virtue of his performances with the Services team and his seniority in Australian cricket, Hassett appeared certain to succeed Bradman as captain; his only rival for the position was NSW captain Arthur Morris, the third selector during the tour of England. The season, which was purely domestic with no touring Test team, started with Bradman's testimonial match, in which Hassett led a team against the retiring Australian leader. Hassett scored 35 and 102 and the match ended with the scores tied. Bradman's outfit managed to fall short of the victory by the smallest possible margin, ending one run short of their target with one wicket remaining at the end of the final over. Hassett continued his liking for the Queensland attack, scoring 104 and 205 in Victoria's two matches against their northern opponents for the year. Victoria did not do so well as a team, winning two and losing one of the six matches in which Hassett played, as New South Wales took the title. The summer finished with Hassett captaining a team against an eleven led by Morris. The match was designated as a trial for the selection of the Australian team to tour South Africa the following summer. Hassett scored 73 and 159 and top-scored in both innings; Morris 66 and 12. However, Hassett's effort was not enough to stop an eight-wicket defeat after Morris's men took a 377-run first innings lead. Morris and Hassett were the first and third highest run-scorers for the 1948–49 season. Hassett ended the season with 855 runs at 61.07.

The day after the match, the chosen touring team was passed to the Board of Control for a decision on the captaincy. The 7–6 result in favour of Hassett provoked Ray Robinson to write that the deciding vote, cast for Hassett by the Board chairman Dr Allen Robertson (from Victoria), "... save[d] the Board from an act of disgusting ingratitude" and that, "... once again Hassett's notable achievements with the Services team had been devalued." The main reason given for the administrators' less than unanimous endorsement of Hassett was his religion. As an Irish Catholic, Hassett was subjected to the sectarian bias of some Australian cricket officials, an attitude that was common among the Anglo-Saxon Protestant ruling class of the time, and so narrowly became the first Catholic captain since Percy McDonnell in 1888.

The team itself was significantly different from the Invincibles squad. Bradman had retired; Sid Barnes, Don Tallon, Ernie Toshack and Bill Brown were unavailable, while the omission of Keith Miller caused a furore. Miller later joined the tour after an injury sustained in a car crash sidelined Bill Johnston for an extended period at the start of the tour. However, Johnston recovered, and both he and Miller took their places in all five Tests, eliminating any disadvantage caused by the controversial initial omission of the latter.

Matching Bradman's feat, Hassett led his team through South Africa undefeated and claimed the Test series 4–0, winning 14 out of 21 matches. Although he was hampered by recurrent problems with his tonsils, the success of the tour was attributed to Hassett's, "... unobtrusive yet dominant personality." He scored 889 first-class runs at 68.38 on the tour, including four centuries. In the lead-up to the Tests, Hassett scored 100 and 96, and he led Australia to four consecutive wins, three by an innings and the other by ten wickets.

The opening Test began at Johannesburg on Christmas Eve 1949. Batting first, Australia started poorly when both opening batsmen failed to score, before Hassett "transformed the course of the game with a hundred of considerable quality." He compiled 112 (in 261 minutes) of the 198 runs added while he was at the crease; Australia amassed 413 then bowled South Africa out twice to win by an innings. He then scored 57 and enforced the follow on in an eight-wicket win in the Second Test.

Hassett's winning run looked at an end when Australia was exposed to a sticky wicket in the Third Test. The hosts had reached 2/240 at the end of the first day before rain hit and made the pitch extremely difficult for batting. The next day, Hassett had to waste time to keep South Africa batting on the poor surface so that Australia's batsmen would not be exposed to the worst conditions. He then told his bowlers to perform badly so that the hosts would not realise how difficult the pitch was and declare so that Australia would have to face the sticky wicket. Despite Hassett's subterfuge, the pitch was so poor that South Africa fell to be 311 all out, but Australia had gained extra time. The tourists made only 75, but then dismissed the hosts for 99, Hassett using defensive tactics to slow the scoring and keep South Africa batting as the pitch slowly improved. Australia chased down the target of 336 with five wickets in hand to secure a highly unlikely win. The local newspaper, The Natal Mercury said that "Renowned for their fighting qualities as a cricketers, the occasion brought the best out of the Australians ... That indomitable spirit to win through, no matter what the circumstances may be, was in most marked evidence."

Hassett's perfect record as Test captain ended in the Fourth Test, when he made 53 in a high-scoring draw. He then "reached peak form" in the final Test at Port Elizabeth. He top-scored with 167 as the match unfolded in a similar manner to the First Test, with a similar result. Australia made 7/549 declared and then won by an innings and 259 runs after enforcing the follow on.

As a leader, Hassett was regarded as an outstanding success. In that era, the tours were accompanied by much ceremony, and captains were expected to make many appearances with dignitaries at dinner parties and make speeches. He had his players participate in cultural activities such as dancing and singing with indigenous tribesmen, and reached out to the local children, interspersing his presentations with self-deprecating jibes. As the team's boat departed for home, Hassett tossed his remaining money away among the local children. The Australian High Commission hailed him as the most effective Australian diplomat to have visited South Africa. Of his on-field performances, the historian Chris Harte wrote that "Hassett’s captaincy impressed from the start. His warmth of personality and sense of fun contrasted with Bradman’s efficient but cold methods. It was a happy tour with the players remembering particularly the hospitality offered to them."

=== Success at home ===
Hassett started the 1950–51 season strongly; after making 19 against England for Victoria, he struck 113 and 179 against South Australia and New South Wales in his two other matches before the Tests.

The England team that visited Australia for the 1950–51 Ashes series had a poor start to their tour, but at Brisbane on the opening day of the First Test, "... surprised even themselves by dismissing Australia for 228 on a good pitch." However, rain intervened to negate England's advantage, and when the contest resumed two days later, England batted on a sticky wicket. The English captain Freddie Brown conceded a first-innings lead of 160 runs by declaring with his team's score on 7/68 to force Australia to bat in unfavourable conditions. The Australian batsmen fared worse in the difficult conditions and Hassett gambled by declaring at 7/32, setting England 193 to win. Hassett himself had only managed eight and three for the match. During the 70 minutes remaining before stumps, Australia took six English wickets (which meant that 20 wickets fell for 102 runs in the day's play), and went on to win the match by 70 runs the following day. Hassett returned to his normal form away from the sticky wicket, scoring 127 and 28 not out against Queensland between Tests. It was his third century in as many matches for Victoria.

In the Second Test at Melbourne, "Australia owed much to the imperturbable Hassett", as he top-scored with 52 in the first innings. Australia won another low-scoring match by 28 runs; Freddie Brown was the only other player to post a half century in the match and no team passed 200. Hassett then stroked 70 in the Third Test, which Australia won by an innings to take an unassailable 3–0 series lead, before Australia won their fifth Test in a row in the next match in Adelaide.

Before the final Test, Hassett's run-scoring peaked when he stroked 232 against Brown's men in a drawn match for Victoria. In the Fifth Test at the MCG, he top-scored with 92 before his dismissal to a one-handed diving catch sparked a collapse and Australia managed only 217 batting first. The tourists took a first innings lead and Hassett made 48 in Australia's second innings of 197. England made the 95 needed for victory, and the eight-wicket loss was Australia's first Test defeat since the resumption of international cricket after World War II, ending a streak of 25 Tests without defeat. Hassett and Brown described the series as the friendliest they had been involved in, but despite the success on the field, the series was poorly attended and revenue was down by around 25% from the corresponding tour four years earlier, mainly due to the absence of Bradman to spark public interest.

Hassett was the second-highest run-scorer of the series, hitting 366 runs at 40.67. Only England's Len Hutton (533 runs at 88.83) was better. Hassett ended the first-class season with 1,423 runs at 64.68, including four centuries and five fifties, topping the run-scoring aggregates. He played in seven shield matches without defeat, winning five to help Victoria to another title.

Wisden, taking into consideration Australia's post-war record and the West Indies' success during their 1950 tour of England, declared the 1951–52 series between the two sides to be, "the unofficial cricket championship of the world". Hassett went into the First Test at Brisbane without playing a first-class match for the season due to the scheduling. However, this was negated by the fact that the tourists only had one match of comparable standard before the Tests, prompting Hassett to make some unusually blunt comments, saying that "The West Indies have suffered from sheer stupidity in the organisation of their tour". Like many of the Australians, he struggled to pick the action of West Indian leg spinner Sonny Ramadhin. He was out for only six in the first innings, as Australia eked out a 10-run lead. He then managed 35 as Australia scraped home in the second innings by three wickets to 7/236. He had been dismissed by Ramadhin both times, bowled and lbw, unable to pick which way the ball was spinning. Between Tests, Hassett had an opportunity to rectify this problem when Victoria hosted the Caribbean tourists, but Ramadhin prevailed again, dismissing him for 12 in his only innings. Having worked out how to pick Ramadhin's variations, he compiled 132 and 46 not out in a seven-wicket win in the Second Test at Sydney. Hassett's century was part of a 235-run partnership with Keith Miller, an Australian Test record for any wicket against the West Indies. Ramadhin ended with 1/196 and was demoralised. Between Tests, Hassett's Victorians faced New South Wales in consecutive matches. Hassett scored 92 in the first encounter, a high-scoring draw, and his team had the upper hand in the latter, forcing their opponents to hold on with only three wickets remaining.

Hassett missed the next Test with a strained muscle; this led to a bureaucratic restriction that hindered his deputy Morris. Having been injured on the eve of the Test, Hassett's withdrawal forced the selectors to call in batsman Phil Ridings at late notice, but some of the board members could not be contacted to ratify the decision. This meant that Hassett had to be replaced by a spare bowler who was already in the squad. In Hassett's absence, Australia's thin batting line-up collapsed on a damp pitch hostile to batsmen and lost. Returning for the Fourth Test at the MCG, Australia's batsmen again struggled; Hassett made 15 and his team conceded a lead of 56 on the first innings. His team was set a second innings target of 260 runs to win. Hassett made 102 but found little support from the other batsmen. When he was dismissed with the score at 8/218, the West Indies appeared set to level the series. However, an unbeaten last wicket partnership of 38 runs between tailenders Doug Ring and Bill Johnston gave Australia an unlikely victory and the series 3–1. It was reported that Hassett, who had just taken a shower after being dismissed, was so mesmerised by the efforts of Ring and Johnston that the watched the final moments of the match naked from the change rooms.

Ahead of the final Test of the series, Hassett's Victorians suffered a four-wicket defeat in their second match of the season against the West Indies, Hassett scoring 56 and 43. Australia completed an emphatic 4–1 result by winning the final encounter, even though they were bowled out for 116 on the first day of the match, before fighting back to dismiss the tourists for 78. Hassett's second innings score of 64 took his total to 402 runs (at an average of 57.43), making him the leading run-scorer for the series. Hassett ended the season with a dominant 229 against South Australia, setting up an innings win, dwarfing the 222 and 166 made by his opponents combined. Despite this, New South Wales claimed the Sheffield Shield for the season, and Hassett ended the summer with 855 runs at 61.07.

=== Australia's decline and the Ashes lost ===
In 1952–53, South Africa's cricket authorities were hesitant to send their inexperienced team to Australia, fearing that the Test series would be uncompetitive. The Australian Board of Control's concern that—after losing money on the previous season's tour by the West Indies—the series would be another financial disaster resulted in South Africa offering an indemnity of £10,000 against any losses. Hassett began the season with two consecutive Sheffield Shield losses before the Tests, although he did manage 91 against South Australia before facing South Africa. He scored 123 in the return match later in the season and Victoria recorded two wins under his watch, against Queensland.

Australia won the opening game of the rubber in an unexpectedly close match in Brisbane by 96 runs, Hassett making 55 and 17. South Africa struck back and gained their first Test victory over Australia for 41 years, taking the Second Test at Melbourne by 82 runs. Australia recovered momentum by convincingly winning the Third Test by an innings, but Hassett's form had been mediocre in all three encounters, totalling 76 runs in five innings. In the Fourth Test at Adelaide, he played his only significant innings for the series, scoring 163 and sharing a 275-run stand with Colin McDonald. With Australia heading for a victory that would give them the series, Ray Lindwall and Miller suffered injuries and were unable to bowl in the second innings. This compelled Hassett to delay his second innings declaration: South Africa then forced a draw by batting out 73 (eight-ball) overs against the depleted bowling attack with four wickets in hand. In anticipation of the forthcoming tour of England, Australian selectors made a fateful decision to rest Lindwall and Miller for the last Test when Hassett won the toss and elected to bat. He scored 40 runs in a total of 520 that gave Australia apparent command of the match. However, South Africa again fought back; after scoring 435, the tourists bowled Australia out for 209, Hassett making 30. They then won the match by chasing a target of 297 runs in their second innings. Hassett bowled the final over and the tourists’ Roy McLean took three fours from the first five balls to reach their target and square the series. Hassett ended the Tests with 309 runs at 38.63 and the entire season with 779 runs at 38.95, a substantially lower return compared to previous Australian summers.

For the first time in 20 years, Australia had failed to win a Test series at home, the last being the infamous Bodyline series of 1932–33. Wisden called the 2–2 result, "... the biggest cricket shock for many years." The absence of Lindwall and Miller in the later part of the series exposed the limitations of the other Australian bowlers and did not augur well for the future. Hassett made it known that the tour of England in 1953 would be his farewell to the game. The selectors included only two specialist opening batsmen in the team, which caused problems when McDonald was injured and Morris struggled for form. This forced Hassett to play as an opener in the Tests; while Morris's old partner Barnes was in England to report on the tour as a reporter, his history of criticising cricket administrators meant that officialdom would call him into the squad to cover for McDonald. There were also tensions among the team off the field. The more experienced members of the team from Hassett's generation were World War II veterans, and were happy to be alive and tended to enjoy drinking and partying, while the younger members tended to be teetotallers. This led to a divide as the seniors regularly halted the team bus for drinking stops at the roadside pubs, leaving their younger teammates waiting. Some of the non-drinkers said that because of the frequent visits at pubs, the team bus only travelled approximately 15 km each hour.

Hassett struggled in two warm-up matches against Tasmania before the Australians left for England, and despite winning both fixtures, it was not to be a happy tour on the field. In the first match on English soil, against East Molesey, Bill Johnston, Australia's leading wicket-taker in 1948, broke down with a serious knee injury. Hassett struggled in the opening first-class matches in England, passing 40 only once in six innings. In the last match before the Tests, against Sussex, he hit an unbeaten 108. Australia's progress before the Tests was constantly curtailed by bad weather. Of the six first-class matches that Hassett played, three did not reach the second innings, although Australia did manage two victories.

In the First Test at Trent Bridge, Hassett hit 115 in a rain-affected match that ended in a draw. Over the next month, he struggled in the county matches, scoring only 30 runs in total. The Australians were to be frustrated in the next three Tests. In the Second Test at Lord's, Hassett made 104, top-scoring in Australia's 346 despite being hindered by a bandaged right arm and cramps. England took a 26-run first innings lead, but Australia replied with 368. Hassett's bowlers reduced England to 3/12 but they hung on to deny Australia victory. The Third Test was another wet affair. Hassett made 26 as Australia scored 318 and took a 42-run first innings lead, but they then collapsed to be 8/35. Australia was saved from defeat by the rain, which meant that less than 14 hours of play was possible.

In the Fourth Test, the Australians worked themselves into a position to win the match and thus retain the Ashes. Hassett made 37 as his team compiled 266 and took a 99-run first innings lead. The tourists looked set for victory and retention of The Ashes at the start of the final day, but time-wasting and defiant defence from the English batsmen left Australia a target of 177 in the last two hours. This would have required a scoring rate much higher than in the first four days of the match. Hassett made only four, but Australia had made 111 in 75 minutes and were on schedule for a win. At that point, English medium-pacer Trevor Bailey began bowling with the wicket-keeper more than two metres down the leg side in order to deny the Australians an opportunity to hit the ball, but the umpires did not penalise them as wides. The match ended in a draw with Australia at 4/147 when time ran out. English wicket-keeper Godfrey Evans said that "they were right" in claiming that Bailey's bowling was "the worst kind of negative cricket" and that he had "cheated [them] of victory". The match was also marred by a series of umpiring decisions made by Frank Chester against the Australians, leading Hassett to request that he not be appointed for the Fifth Test, something the English cricket authorities granted.

This meant that the fate of the Ashes would be determined by the final match at The Oval. Hassett warmed up with consecutive half-centuries against Surrey and Warwickshire. In the second innings of the latter match, he made 21 not out, holding the team together as Australia stumbled to 5/53 in pursuit of 166 for victory when time ran out.

In Australia's tour matches at The Oval, the pacemen had been effective, and Hassett and Morris thought that things would be similar in the Tests. As a result, leg spinner Ring was omitted. Hassett made 53 as Australia made 275 batting first. England then took a 31-run lead and Hassett was out for only 10 in the second innings as Australia fell for only 162, as the local spinners Jim Laker and Tony Lock cut down the Australians on a turning surface. The hosts then reached the target safely with eight wickets in hand to claim a 1–0 victory, thus winning the Ashes for the first time since the infamous Bodyline tour of 1932–33. Hassett was in fine form after the Tests, scoring 148 against Somerset, 65 against Kent, 106 against South, and 74 and 25 against TN Pearce's XI in the remaining first-class matches in England. Australia managed to win the matches against Kent and South by an innings, but it was too late to save the Ashes. Nevertheless, Harte said that "Hassett’s leadership throughout had been sparkling".

Hassett made one final first-class appearance upon returning to Australia, in a testimonial match against Morris's XI. He made 126 in the first innings, his final century, but could manage only three in the second as his team went down by 121 runs. Nevertheless, the match sent him into retirement £5,503 wealthier, and with more first-class centuries than any Australian except Bradman.

== Style and personality ==
The diminutive Hassett was an elegant middle-order batsman, known for his wide range of strokes, timing, quick footwork and strong wrists. However, as his career progressed and his seniority in the Australian team increased, he became a more cautious player who often frustrated spectators with sedate scoring, particularly after World War II. Despite this, Hassett remained an aggressive and adventurous strokemaker in matches for Victoria. He had a poker face, and this benefited him as a captain, as even his teammates sometimes found it hard to discern his mood or thinking. During his 24 Test matches in charge, he won 14 games and suffered defeat only four times, but it was the last of the four losses that blighted his record. Hassett was a very occasional right-arm medium pace bowler, averaging one over per first-class match. He took 18 wickets in 216 matches, and never took more than two in a single innings. He never took a wicket at Test level and bowled fewer than 19 overs.

Hassett's most distinctive trait was his fun-loving personality. He was famed for his practical jokes, sense of humour—particularly his self-deprecating quips—and wit, such as in his calming talk to the rioters in Calcutta in 1945. He remained jovial during his speeches even after Australia suffered defeats. After bowing out of Test cricket in 1953 with a loss, he said that England "earned the victory from the very first ball—to the second last over anyway", referring to an over that he bowled when defeat became inevitable.

During the 1938 tour of England, Hassett smuggled a "wet, muddy, and complaining" mountain goat (put a waistcoat on the goat, according to some sources) into the bedroom he shared with Stan McCabe and O'Reilly while the team was staying at Grindleford, after they had fallen asleep. They awoke to unexpected smells and bleating. During the 1948 tour of England, he was reported to have unnerved his teammates and tempted fate by bringing a toy duck into the dressing room, and held up play during a county match by hiding the ball in a pile of sawdust. During the same summer, Hassett and a few teammates were being chauffeured back to London after a function. It was after midnight, but Hassett asked the driver to stop at a random mansion along the road. He then rang the bell and told the startled householder that he "just thought we'd pop in". The owner happened to recognise Hassett and received the cricketers. In the Third Test of the same tour, after dropping two hooked catches from Washbrook, Hassett responded by borrowing a policeman's helmet, before motioning to Ray Lindwall to bowl another bouncer. During the 1953 tour of England, a waiter spilled a dessert on Hassett's jacket. Initially declining the waiter's multiple offers to have his jacket taken away for cleaning, Hassett acquiesced and while taking off his jacket, noticed a spot on his trousers. He then silently pointed to the spot, removed his trousers and handed them to the waiter, before continuing to eat his meal in his underpants.

Aside from the humorous side of his personality, Hassett was also known for his diplomatic skills as a leader and his affability, particularly his ability to endear himself to hosts and public while representing Australia overseas. Richie Benaud wrote of Hassett: "There are others who have made more runs and taken more wickets, but very few have ever got more out of a lifetime." Teammate Keith Miller said that Hassett had "more genuine friends in all walks of life than any other cricketer".

== Outside cricket ==
After returning from World War II, Hassett operated a sports store in Melbourne; one of his staff members was Victorian Test teammate Neil Harvey. After retiring from cricket, Hassett joined the Australian Broadcasting Commission as a radio commentator in 1956, remaining in that position until 1981. During his time in the commentary booth, he was known for his self-deprecating humour and frequently made fun of his conservative approach to batting during the latter half of his career. Hassett was known for his disapproval of some of the aspects of the modern evolution of cricket, particularly the more aggressive player conduct that contrasted with the more sedate and gentlemanly style of his era.

He served on the executive committee of the Anti-Cancer Council of Victoria, along with fellow former South Melbourne, Victorian and Test cricketer Laurie Nash. Hassett ran for election as South Melbourne's delegate to the VCA in December 1953, but was defeated. During the 1954–55 Ashes series in Australia, he wrote for The Daily Telegraph.

In 1942, Hassett married Tessie Davis, a Geelong accountant, and they had two daughters. His nephew John Shaw went on to play for Victoria in the 1950s and 1960s. A batsman, Shaw was a regular member of the state team and was selected for an Australian Second XI that toured New Zealand in 1959–60. The MCG has a function room named after Hassett, as does the VCA, which launched a monthly luncheon club in December 1990 named in his honour. In the first year of its operation, more than 500 people joined and a profit in excess of AUD12,000 was made; this money was reinvested in the VCA's promotion of junior cricket.

In his final years, Hassett moved to Batehaven on the south coast of New South Wales to pursue his love of fishing. He died there in 1993.

== Test match performance ==
		Batting				Bowling			
Opposition	Matches	Runs	Average	High Score	100 / 50	Runs	Wickets	Average	Best (Inns)
England	24	1,572	38.34	137	4/6	60	0	–	–
India	4	332	110.66	198*	1/1	–	–	–	–
New Zealand	1	19	19.00	19	0/0	–	–	–	–
South Africa	10	748	53.42	167	3/3	18	0	–	–
West Indies	4	402	57.42	132	2/1	–	–	–	–
Overall	43	3,073	46.56	198*	10/11	78	0	–	–

== Sources ==
- Ashes 1946–47: Lindsay Hassett recalls his hundred in the Brisbane Test with his incredible sense of humour at CricketCountry; accessed 25 March 2014.
