= Cyril Washbrook =

English cricketer

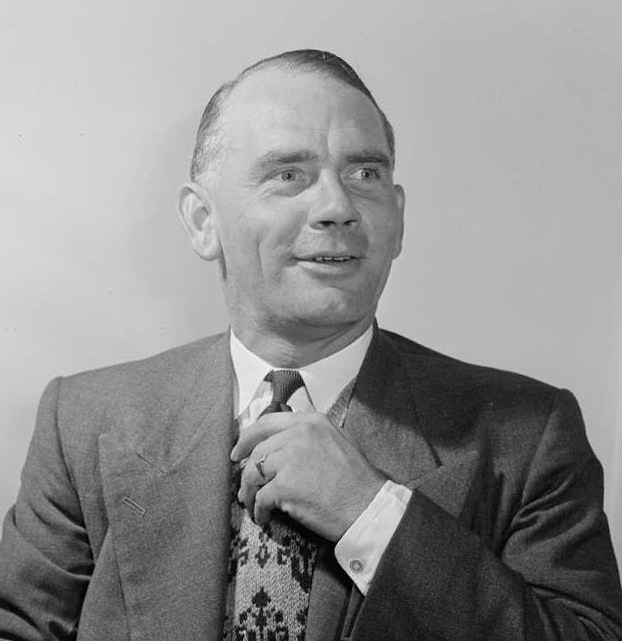
- Washbrook in 1951

Personal information
- Full name: Cyril Washbrook
- Born: 6 December 1914; Barrow, Clitheroe, Lancashire, England
- Died: 27 April 1999 (aged 84); Sale, Greater Manchester, England
- Batting: Right-handed
- Bowling: Right-arm medium
- Role: Batsman

International information
- National side: England
- Test debut (cap 299): 14 August 1937 v New Zealand
- Last Test: 28 August 1956 v Australia

Domestic team information
- Years: Team
- 1933–1964: Lancashire

Career statistics
| Competition | Test | First-class |
|---|---|---|
| Matches | 37 | 592 |
| Runs scored | 2,569 | 34,101 |
| Batting average | 42.81 | 42.67 |
| 100s/50s | 6/12 | 76/176 |
| Top score | 195 | 251* |
| Balls bowled | 36 | 474 |
| Wickets | 1 | 7 |
| Bowling average | 33.00 | 44.14 |
| 5 wickets in innings | 0 | 0 |
| 10 wickets in match | 0 | 0 |
| Best bowling | 1/25 | 2/8 |
| Catches/stumpings | 12/– | 212/– |
- Source: CricketArchive, 15 August 2022

Cyril Washbrook CBE (6 December 1914 – 27 April 1999) was an English cricketer, who played for Lancashire and England. He had a long career, split by World War II, and ending when he was aged 44. Washbrook, who is most famous for opening the batting for England with Len Hutton, which he did 51 times, played a total of 592 first-class cricket matches, of which 37 were Tests. Washbrook was named one of the five Wisden Cricketers of the Year in 1947.

== Career ==
Washbrook was born in Barrow, Clitheroe, Lancashire. After being schooled at Bridgnorth Grammar School, aged 18, he went to Lancashire County Cricket Club, although it was not until two years later, in 1935, that he was fully established in the side, after scoring 1,724 runs and coming fifth in the national averages. He was selected to play his first Test in 1937, against New Zealand at The Oval. However, he could only make 9 and 8 not out, and was not selected for the Australian Tests the next year.

The war then interrupted his career, with Washbrook becoming a physical training instructor in the Royal Air Force, and it was in the 1946–47 Ashes series that he finally took on Australia. Hutton and Washbrook made three consecutive century stands, as Washbrook, with his cricket cap cocked in a jaunty style, became a familiar figure to cricket fans in Australia and England.

Washbrook was a strong leg side player, noted for his hooks and pulls, and was at his greatest in the late 1940s. He was made one of the Wisden Cricketers of the Year in 1947, and was awarded a benefit by Lancashire in 1948, which raised £14,000.

He was a notable fielder at cover, and was admired by the Old Trafford faithful.

During the tour of South Africa in 1948/9 Washbrook scored 542 runs in 5 Test matches, including his highest Test score of 195 made in the second Test at Johannesburg. He shared in a 359 run partnership with Hutton which was the first wicket record at the time, and remains the first wicket record for England.

He was a reluctant tourist in the 1950–51 Ashes series, and was beaten many times by Australia's spinner, Jack Iverson. After the first Test of 1951 against New Zealand, he was dropped from the Test side, reputedly against the wishes of his batting partner, Hutton. His average partnership with Hutton in Tests was 60.

In 1954, Washbrook was appointed Lancashire's first ever professional captain, a role he held on until 1959, when he was awarded a second benefit, which raised £1,520. Washbrook was appointed a Test selector in 1956. After England had lost the Second Test against Australia at Lord's, to go one-nil down in the five match series, the 41-year-old was asked by his fellow selectors to leave the room. When he returned, they asked him if he would play in the Third Test at Headingley. Washbrook made 98, sharing a stand of 187 with Peter May, after England had been reduced to 17 for three. England won the game, and Washbrook stayed in the team, scoring just 6 in the Fourth Test at Old Trafford, in which Jim Laker took his record-breaking 19 wickets as England went two-one up. The Fifth Test at The Oval saw Washbrook's last Test innings, a duck, but with the game drawn, England had won the Ashes.

From 1989 to 1990, Washbrook was president of Lancashire. He was appointed CBE in the 1991 Birthday Honours.

Washbrook died in Sale, Greater Manchester, at the age of 84.
