= Jack Hill (cricketer) =

Australian cricketer

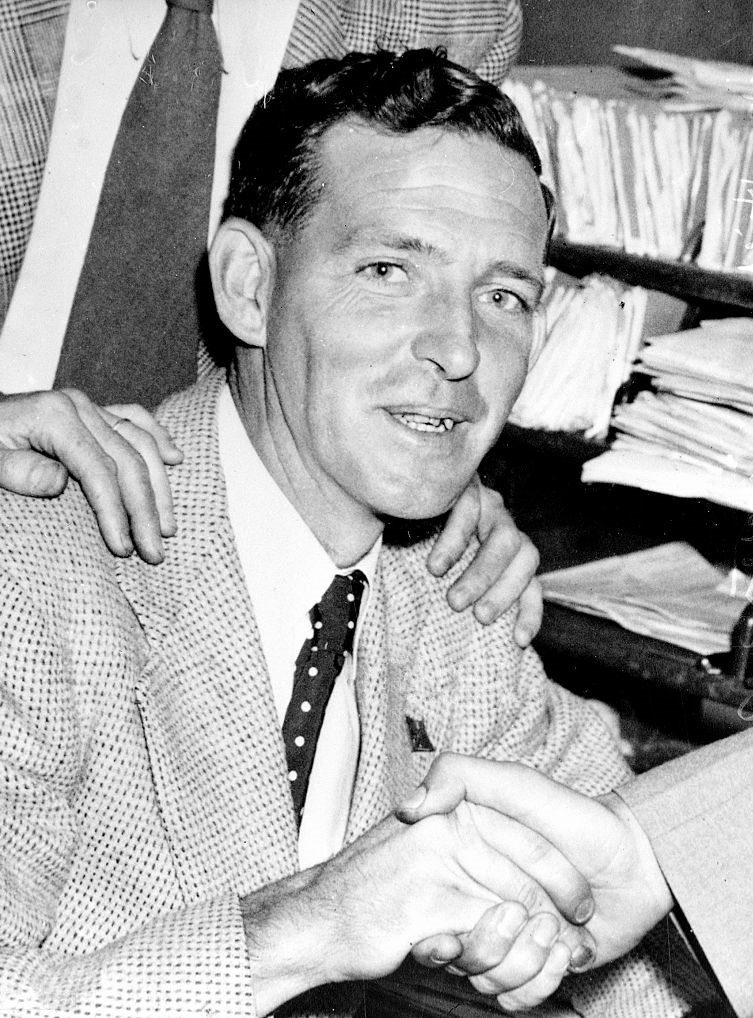
- Hill in 1953 after selection in the Australian team to tour England

Personal information
- Born: 25 June 1923; Murrumbeena, Victoria, Australia
- Died: 11 August 1974 (aged 51); Caulfield, Victoria, Australia
- Batting: Right-handed
- Bowling: Leg break, googly

International information
- National side: Australia
- Test debut (cap 196): 11 June 1953 v England
- Last Test: 14 May 1955 v West Indies

Career statistics
Competition	Test	First-class
Matches	3	69
Runs scored	21	867
Batting average	7.00	16.05
100s/50s	0/0	0/1
Top score	8*	51*
Balls bowled	606	13,718
Wickets	8	218
Bowling average	34.12	23.11
5 wickets in innings	0	9
10 wickets in match	0	1
Best bowling	3/35	7/51
Catches/stumpings	2/–	63/–
- Source: Cricinfo, 14 October 2022

John Charles Hill (25 June 1923 – 11 August 1974) was an Australian cricketer who played in three Test matches from 1953 to 1955.

== Education ==
The son of a Stipendiary Magistrate, Mr. Alec Hill, S.M., Hill received his secondary education at St Patrick's College, Ballarat.

== War service ==
He moved to Melbourne in 1941 and took up a position under the Naval Board; and he went on to see active service in the Royal Australian Air Force from 1942 to 1946.

== Football ==
A star half-forward with St Patrick's College, he trained with Richmond Football Club in the 1943 pre-season, and was placed on their supplementary list at the start of the 1943 season.

He played intermittently for Richmond's Second Eighteen; and, in 1946, he was released by Richmond to the Belgrave Football Club in the Mountain District Football Association.

In 1949, in a semi-finals match on 17 September 1949, in which he kicked nine goals for Belgrave, he was knocked out during the match. He thought nothing of the injury and, thinking it was just concussion, he sought no additional medical treatment. On 4 October, he collapsed at work, and was hospitalised. At the hospital, it was discovered that he had fractured his skull (the second time that he had fractured his skull in his football career). He immediately retired from football, having set the goal-kicking record of 152 goals in a single season.

He was not fit enough to resume cricket until 29 October 1949; and the consequences of this severe head injury were such that he suffered from severe headaches from time to time for the rest of his life; and, very often, he had to take special headache powders in order for him to be able to play cricket.

== Cricket ==
He was already an outstanding schoolboy cricketer whilst at St Patrick's College, where he took 118 wickets in four years, at a time when the college's team only played four matches a year. At 15 years of age he was selected to play in the Ballarat Cricket Association's (senior) team that competed in the Provincial Group of the March 1939 Country Week Carnival in Melbourne. He played at least one of these matches at the Melbourne Cricket Ground.

He played District Cricket for the Melbourne Cricket Club from the beginning of the 1941/1942 season. In his first match for Melbourne, playing against the Essendon Cricket Club, he put on an exceptional performance after the break for tea:

…Splendid bowling by Hill, formerly of St. Patrick's College, Ballarat, was a striking feature of Melbourne's display against Essendon (167). Up till tea time he had 0/24, but he finished with 6/36 off 15.1 overs. Bowling leg breaks slightly faster than usual, he showed good control in his first senior match.
…At Essendon Hill, a new M.C.C. bowler form Mordialloc took 6/3[6]. He kept a good length and got wickets with top spinners that made pace from the pitch.

During the time he was in the R.A.A.F. he was stationed near Sydney and, whilst there, he played intermittently with the Mosman Cricket Club. In 1945 he transferred to the St Kilda Cricket Club.

Reporting on his October 1945 debut for St Kilda, following his 1945 transfer from Melbourne, The Argus commented:

…A remarkable debut in the St Kilda team was made by Jack Hill, who transferred from Melbourne. At North Melbourne on Saturday he took four for 5 off 6.3 overs, making great pace off the wicket and turning slightly from the leg. Still in the RAAF, he is something of the O'Reilly type, although there is not the same swirl of arms and legs.

== State Cricket ==
He played in 69 Sheffield Shield cricket matches for Victoria, from 1946 to 1956, scoring 867 runs, and taking 218 wickets. He took a wicket, bowling the South Australian batsman Tom Klose with the first ball he ever bowled for Victoria.

He was also famous for not scoring what might have been the easiest runs ever scored in a Sheffield Shield Cricket in the first innings of Victoria's match against New South Wales, at the St Kilda Cricket Ground on Saturday, 24 December 1955:

Hill Misses a Golf Shot
Victorian top-spinner Jack Hill played at the slowest ball bowled to him in inter-State cricket on Saturday — and missed. Later in the day at the Shield game at St. Kilda the greasy ball slipped from Pat Crawford's hand as he approached the bowling crease. The ball trickled slowly towards square leg and stopped rolling about level with the batting crease. Hill walked across, addressed the ball in true golf fashion, swung hard . . . . and made an "air shot". As soon as Hill's swing was completed Ian Craig stepped in and picked up the ball. Under the laws of cricket a batsman is entitled to hit any ball considered by the umpire to have been delivered that comes to rest in front of the batting wicket. No fieldsman has the right to Interfere while the batsman is playing the stroke. — The Argus, Monday, 26 December 1955.

== Test Cricket ==
"Jack Hill [is] the surprise choice of the 17. He bowls faster than the orthodox leg spinner but on our [Australian] pitches does not turn to any extent. His length is usually impeccable and without any doubt his inclusion is an insurance against the failure of our other leg spinners [viz., Doug Ring and Richie Benaud], coupled with the thought that he may even force his claims to a place in the eleven on his own prowess."
Sir Donald Bradman (February 1953)"

=== Selection ===
To the relief of the many who had come to refer to the continuously overlooked Hill as "Australia's forgotten cricketer", the Australian selectors announced in February 1953, that they had selected him for the team to tour England for the 1953 "Coronation" Ashes series.

Although cricket writer Tom Goodman thought that Hill's selection was "a surprise" and "a gamble", former Australian champion spin-bowler Bill "Tiger" O'Reilly, commended the Australian selectors for "[their] effort to tighten up the distressing state of our spin attack" and expressed his view that "if Hill can adapt himself to the English conditions he will be a certain choice for the Test attack on tour".

At the time of his 1953 Test selection, a newspaper described his action as follows:

…Jack Hill, the "slightly different" bowler… grips the ball as though he will bowl a leg break, but, although he can bowl leg breaks, he is really a top spinner, making great pace off the wicket. He has surprised and bowled many good batsmen because the ball nips off the wicket much faster than expected.

In its October 1974 obituary, The Cricketer described his action as follows:

...Jack Hill, 51, who died in Melbourne on 11 August, was a topspin bowler who took seven wickets in two Tests at Trent Bridge and Old Trafford in 1953. They included leading batsmen in May, Graveney, W. J. Edrich and Kenyon and he twice dislodged Bailey. Hill took 63 wickets on the tour and in a third Test in 1955 dismissed Holt at Bridgetown. Lifting his front foot high, almost a goose-step, Hill delivered with a leg-break roll, but needed responsive turf for the ball to turn at his pace. Often around the leg stump, he was a difficult bowler for wicketkeepers and one sharp blow on an ankle knocked Len Maddocks' legs from under him.

=== Tasmania ===
On the way to England, Hill played with an Australian XI against a Tasmanian team, in Hobart, in March 1953. On the first day, the Australian XI were 9/505 at stumps. By the end of the second day the Tasmanian team were 2/21 in their second innings, having been forced to follow on after being all out for 202. Hill bowled eleven overs, had three maidens and took none for 24. The Tasmanian team went on to score 234 in its second innings; Hill taking 2 for 28 off 11 overs (with three maidens).

The team squad then travelled to Launceston, and played a match against a combined Northern Tasmanian side. The Australian XI, made up of Lindsay Hassett (captain), Arthur Morris (vice captain), Ron Archer, Richie Benaud, Alan Davidson, Jim de Courcy, Jack Hill, Graeme Hole, Bill Johnston, Gil Langley, (cricketer), and Colin McDonald. Hill had been selected as twelfth man; however, he replaced Ray Lindwall in the team, who was indisposed from having a tooth extracted the day before. The remainder of the squad were used to strengthen the opposition, and Ian Craig, Keith Miller, Neil Harvey, Doug Ring and Don Tallon all played for the combined Northern Tasmanian side. At the end of the first day's play, the Combined side were all out for 262 (hill's figures were 0/27), and the Australian XI were 93 without loss. At the end of the second day, the Australian XI had scored 469 (Hill scored 20) and the combined team were 2/19 in its second innings (Hill did not bowl on the second day). On the last day, the combined team scored a total of 245 in its second innings (with Hill taking 3/58) and the Australian XI, scoring 41 without loss, won the match.

=== England ===
In 1953, the entire tour of England involved 34 matches in all: five Test cricket matches, and an additional 29 matches that were played before, during, and after the Test series. Of the Five Tests, he played two for Australia against England during the 1953 Ashes Series.

His first Test match appearance was in the rain affected First Test from 11 to 16 June 1953 at Trent Bridge (both he and Alan Davidson made their Australian Test debut in the same match). In a drawn match, he scored a duck and four runs; and took 3/35 and 1/26.

His second Test match appearance was the Third Test, from 9–14 July 1953 at Old Trafford. In a drawn match, he scored 8 runs (n.o.) and a duck, and took 3/97 in England's only innings.

He was twelfth man for the Fourth Test at Headingley). The first four matches of the series were drawn; and the last match of the series (for which Hill was not selected) was won by the M.C.C. by eight wickets. Of the 29 additional matches that the squad contested during the tour, he played in 20 of them.

=== West Indies ===
In 1955, the entire tour of the West Indies involved 12 matches in all: five Test cricket matches, and an additional 7 matches that were played before and during the Test series; one of the additional matches, a two-day match between an Australian XI and, G.A. Headley's XI, a team selected by the eminent West Indian cricketer G. A. Headley, that was scheduled to take place on 6 and 7 June 1955, at Jarrett Park, in Montego Bay, was abandoned when play could not commence on either day due to heavy rain.

He played a single Test match for Australia against the West Indies:the drawn Fourth Test match, at Kensington Oval, Bridgetown from 14 to 20 May 1955, in which he scored 8 runs (n.o.) and 1 run, and took 0/71 and 1/44. Of the 6 additional matches that the squad contested, he played in 5 of them.

=== End of Test career ===
After the West Indies, Hill was never considered for Test selection again; the general view was that he had been tried and found wanting at Test level.

In his three match Test career he had taken 8 wickets — Trevor Bailey (twice), Don Kenyon (twice), Peter May, Tom Graveney, Bill Edrich, and the West Indian John Holt — had taken two catches, and had scored 21 runs.

== District Cricket ==
In 1956, whilst still in the Victorian State Squad, he was associated with a move by Lindsay Hassett to open up a Cricket coaching school, the Lindsay Hassett School of Cricket, and was expected, along with Doug Ring, Ernie McCormick, John Edwards, to provide expert coaching, under the supervision of the former Fitzroy off-spinner Joe Plant.

In 1958, the St Kilda team set a record that still stands today: in the match against Northcote, at the rain affected St Kilda Cricket Ground, on Saturday 15 November 1958, St Kilda dismissed Northcote in its first innings for just 33 runs. With such a collapse, only the two fast bowlers John Edwards (1928–2002) and Peter Hosking (1932–) were used in the first innings. Let loose in the second innings, Hill took 5/21 (including Bill Lawry, l.b.w. for 14 runs).

In November 1961, Jack Hill and John Edwards, both playing for St Kilda Cricket Club were both chasing 500 wickets in District Cricket; at that stage they had each taken 497 and 496 wickets, respectively. On the following Saturday (4 November), Hill took four wickets for 6 runs; whilst Edwards failed to take a wicket.

Hill played his last game for the St Kilda Cricket Club in the 1963/1964 District Cricket semi-final against Essendon in March 1964. St Kilda lost the match, with Hill scoring 7 runs in his only innings, and failing to take a wicket.

In a 1950 interview, the Prahran Cricket Club Captain, Ivan Porter, said that of all the bowlers that he had ever faced in his long career, that he was the most impressed with Jack Hill: "He is one of the most difficult to score runs off".

At the end of the 2009/2010 District Cricket season, Jack Hill still shared the St Kilda Cricket Club record for 68 wickets in a season with Harry Zachariah (1911–2009), who had played with Northcote and University (which he captained), before playing 72 games for the St Kilda club from 1940/1941 to 1943/1944, and then moving to the Richmond Cricket Club for the 1944/1945 season. Zachariah took 68 wickets for the St Kilda twice in a single season: in the 1941/1942 and 1943/1944 seasons. Across his whole career, Hill took 612 wickets at an average of 12.99.

== Bureaucrat ==
At the time of his death (at 51) he was a high-level civil servant in the Age and Invalid Pension division of the Victorian Office of the Commonwealth Department of Social Security.

He was also responsible for the management and oversight of the casual ticket selling staff at the St. Kilda Cricket Ground and the South Melbourne Cricket Ground for the home matches of the Fitzroy Football Club and the South Melbourne Football Club, respectively.

== Honours ==
He is a member of the Ballarat Sports Museum's Hall of Fame.
