= VCA Colts cricket team =

Cricket club in Victoria, Melbourne

The VCA Colts cricket team competed in the Melbourne district cricket competition between 1929–30 and the start of World War II. Administered by the Victorian Cricket Association (VCA), it was a developmental team that included mainly young players with potential who were led by one or two players with first-class experience. Some of the notable cricketers who played with the team before their rise to fame included Lindsay Hassett, Ian Johnson and Keith Miller. At one stage, the team was captained by the former Australian skipper Jack Ryder. The team was discontinued during the war years, and replaced in the competition by the Footscray club in 1948–49.
