= Keith Miller =

Australian cricketer (1919–2004)

Keith Miller AM MBE
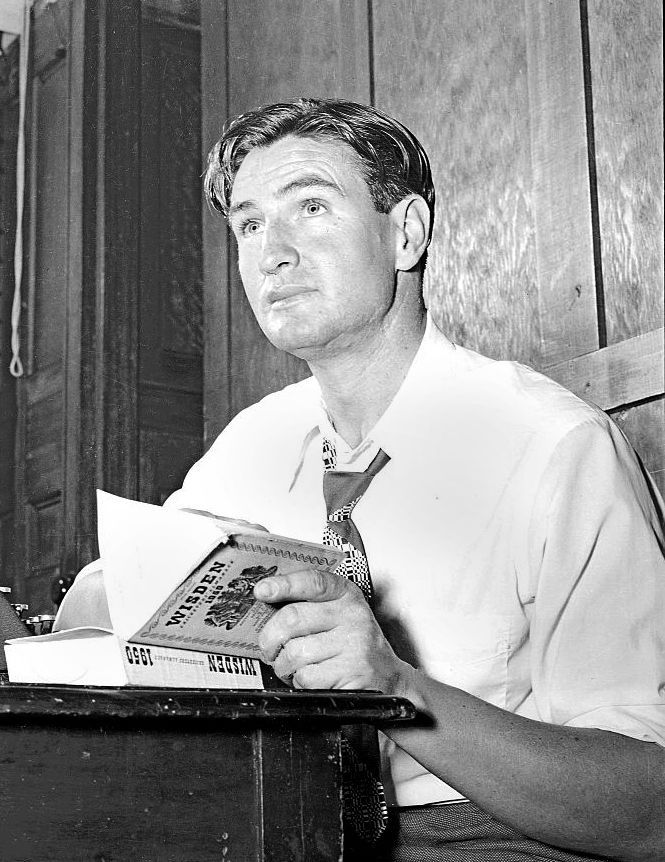
- Miller reading Wisden Cricketers' Almanack in 1951

Personal information
- Full name: Keith Ross Miller
- Born: 28 November 1919; Sunshine, Victoria, Australia
- Died: 11 October 2004 (aged 84); Mornington, Victoria, Australia
- Nickname: Nugget
- Height: 6 ft 2 in (188 cm)
- Batting: Right-handed
- Bowling: Right-arm fast
- Role: All-rounder

International information
- National side: Australia
- Test debut (cap 168): 29 March 1946 v New Zealand
- Last Test: 11 October 1956 v Pakistan

Domestic team information
- Years: Team
- 1937/38–1946/47: Victoria
- 1947/48–1955/56: New South Wales
- 1959: MCC
- 1959: Nottinghamshire

Career statistics
Competition	Test	First-class
Matches	55	226
Runs scored	2,958	14,183
Batting average	36.97	48.90
100s/50s	7/13	41/63
Top score	147	281*
Balls bowled	10,461	28,377
Wickets	170	497
Bowling average	22.97	22.30
5 wickets in innings	7	16
10 wickets in match	1	1
Best bowling	7/60	7/12
Catches/stumpings	38/–	136/–
- Source: CricketArchive, 19 December 2007

Keith Ross Miller AM MBE (28 November 1919 – 11 October 2004) was an Australian Test cricketer and a Royal Australian Air Force pilot during World War II. Miller is widely regarded as Australia's greatest ever all-rounder. His ability, irreverent manner and good looks made him a crowd favourite. Journalist Ian Wooldridge called Miller "the golden boy" of cricket, leading to him being nicknamed "Nugget".

A member of the record-breaking Invincibles, at the time of his retirement from Test cricket in 1956, Miller had the best statistics of any all-rounder in cricket history. He often batted high in the order, sometimes as high as number three. He was a powerful striker of the ball, and one straight six that he hit at the Sydney Cricket Ground was still rising when it hit the upper deck of the grandstand. Miller was famous for varying his bowling to bemuse batsmen: he made sparing use of slower deliveries and would often adjust his run-up, surprisingly bowling his fastest deliveries from a short run. He was also a fine fielder and an especially acrobatic catcher in the slips.

Away from cricket, Miller was also a successful Australian rules footballer. He played for St Kilda and was selected to represent the Victorian state team. He played 50 games for St Kilda, for whom he kicked eight goals in one game against North Melbourne, during 1941.

Miller's personality – love of the contest, rather than victory, and his larger-than-life rebelliousness and carousing – helped both shape and limit his cricketing career, as he espoused the opposite of the more puritanical values of Donald Bradman, his captain and later national selector. Neville Cardus referred to Miller as "the Australian in excelsis"; Wooldridge's response was "By God he was right". This status was reflected when Miller was made one of the ten inaugural members of the Australian Cricket Hall of Fame.

== Early years ==
Born on 28 November 1919 in the western Melbourne suburb of Sunshine, Miller was the youngest of Leslie and Edith Miller's four children. He was named after the Australian pioneer aviator brothers Keith and Ross Smith, who were half-way through their historic flight from England to Australia at the time Miller was born. The three Miller boys played Australian rules football and cricket. Their father had been a successful local cricketer and taught the boys to play with an orthodox and classical technique, relying on a solid defence and concentration in the mould of Bill Ponsford. At the age of seven, Miller's family moved to Elsternwick, in Melbourne's southeast. As a child, Miller was small for his age, which forced him to develop his technique rather than rely on power.

At the age of 12, he was selected for an under-15 Victorian schoolboys cricket team. At the time, he stood only 150 centimetres (4 ft 11 in) tall and wielded a sawn-off bat. He lacked power, but impressed with his footwork and style. Miller reasoned that, as he appeared destined to be short, a career as a jockey was more likely than one as a cricketer or footballer.

Miller attended Melbourne High School, where Australian test captain Bill Woodfull was his mathematics teacher. Miller was a mediocre student, but Woodfull quickly noticed his cricket skills. Aged 14, Miller was selected for the school's first XI. His control and solidity prompted the spectators to call him The Unbowlable—Woodfull's own nickname. (Note: A reference to Bowled.) In 1934, Miller failed all of his subjects, scoring zero in his final exam for Woodfull's geometry class, and was forced to repeat the year.

Keith Truscott, Miller's school cricket captain, took him to a trial with local club side St Kilda at the start of the 1934–35 season, but Miller could not find a place in any of its five teams. Joining the local sub-district cricket club Elsternwick instead, he did not get to bat or bowl in his first match, and was dropped to the second XI for his poor fielding. Nevertheless, his teammate, former Victoria state player Hughie Carroll, spotted Miller's talent and lured him to the rival South Melbourne club. Miller began playing for South Melbourne the following season. It was at South Melbourne that Miller met Ian Johnson and Lindsay Hassett, his future Australia captains. Miller scored 12 not out on debut, but observers felt he would succeed with a stronger physique; Woodfull wrote in the 1936 school magazine, "Miller has Test possibilities".

In March 1936, Miller played for South Melbourne against Carlton, captained by Woodfull. Miller came to the crease at 6/32. He guided his team to 141, putting on a stand of 65 with the last man and finishing with 61. The crowd gave Miller a standing ovation, and newspapers him compared him to Ponsford and Alan Kippax. The Carlton team awarded him a silver eggcup, "for sterling performance", which Woodfull presented to Miller during an algebra class.

In 1999, the Melbourne High School oval was named The Woodfull - Miller Oval and in 2007, a statue of Miller and Woodfull sitting on a seat was unveiled.

== Debuts in Sheffield Shield and Victorian Football League ==
Keith Miller
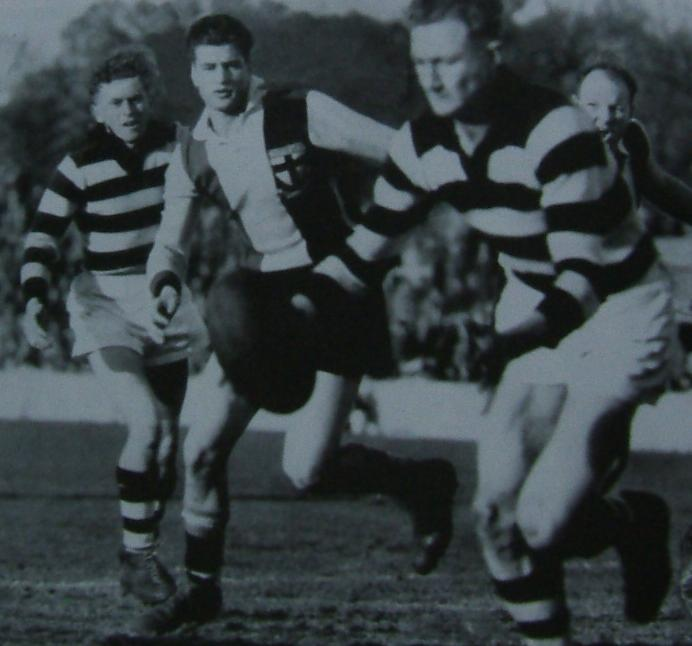
- Miller, in the vertically striped jumper, playing for St Kilda

Personal information
- Original team: Brighton (VFA)
- Height: 185 cm (6 ft 1 in)
- Weight: 80 kg (176 lb)
- Positions: Full back, full forward

Playing career^{1}
Years	Club	Games (Goals)
1940–42; 1946	St Kilda	50 (42)

Representative team honours
Years	Team	Games (Goals)
1946	Victoria	1
- ^{1} Playing statistics correct to the end of 1946.

During 1936, Miller underwent a sudden growth spurt, of 28 centimetres (11.0 in) in the year, reaching 185 centimetres (6 ft 1 in) in height. This thwarted his career as a jockey. With his increased height and weight, he began to play football with more physical aggression. At the end of 1936, he completed year 10 and quit high school, taking a position as a clerk.

For the 1937–38 cricket season, Miller transferred to the VCA Colts, where he won the team's batting trophy for having the best average. At this stage, his method of playing was slow and steady accumulation of runs. Late in the summer, he made his first-class debut for Victoria and hit 181 against Tasmania at the Melbourne Cricket Ground. In 1938–39, he rejoined South Melbourne and also played four further matches for Victoria, scoring 125 runs at an average of 25.00. He was yet to play in the Sheffield Shield competition, having appeared only in one-off matches.

During this period, Miller achieved more success as a footballer, following his brothers in joining the Brighton Football Club in the Victorian Football Association (VFA) in 1937. A defender, Miller initially played on the half-back flank before moving to full back during his third season, in 1939. At this stage, he lacked the strength to hip and shoulder his opponents and relied on his running ability and accurate kicking.

Miller finally made his breakthrough in cricket in 1939–40, when he was selected to make his Sheffield Shield debut, against South Australia at the Adelaide Oval. He managed just four and seven, batting at number five in the order. When Victoria fielded, Miller ran out his future Invincibles captain Don Bradman. One of Miller's teammates was Percy Beames, who was also his manager at Vacuum Oil. Miller scored 41 and 47 not out in his second match to hold his place, but against New South Wales, Miller made a pair of 14s, having difficulties against leg spin. In the return match against South Australia, Miller took the initiative against leg-spinner Clarrie Grimmett, aggressively advancing down the pitch and driving. Miller reached 108, his first century in Shield competition. Apart from the century, Miller had a moderate season, ending with 298 runs at 29.80.

In 1940, Miller started his fourth season in the VFA. In a match against Coburg, aged just 19, he was selected to play at full back, against the greatest forward of the era, Bob Pratt. Miller restricted Pratt to just one goal for the match, and was named best on ground. (Note: Pratt had scored 678 goals in ten seasons for South Melbourne in the Victorian Football League (VFL), the top tier of football.) Scouts from top-tier Victorian Football League (VFL) club St Kilda signed Miller on the spot. In a match for St Kilda against Carlton, Miller was king hit by his opponent Ron Cooper at the start of the match. When the teams next met, Miller shoulder bumped Cooper in the first minute, forcing him to leave the field. St Kilda finished second-last that season.

== War service ==
Miller's sporting career was interrupted by World War II. On 20 August 1940, he joined the Militia (army reserve), and was assigned to the 4th Reserve Motor Transport Company. In late September, Miller began his training. A non-conformist, he had the first of many clashes with authority in November, when he was fined for "using insulting language to a superior officer". Miller soon lived up to the traditional nickname of Dusty for anyone called Miller, owing to his tendency to be involved in fist fights and his rambunctious persona.

During the summer of 1940–41, Miller was granted leave so that he could play interstate cricket. In a war-shortened season, Miller scored 140 runs at 28.00 and took his maiden first-class wicket. The 1941 VFL season also went ahead. Miller played in defence and attack, depending on match conditions. In 16 games, he kicked 28 goals, including eight in one match. He again showed his disrespect for authority and reputation, striking his boss Beames—who played for Melbourne—with a raised elbow at the start of a match. Miller came second in St Kilda's best and fairest for the season.

Miller's season ended early when he was recalled to duty. He had continued disciplinary problems, and left the Militia on 8 November 1941. Miller and a friend then attempted to join the Royal Australian Navy. When the navy rejected his friend, Miller tore up his own paperwork, left the recruiting office, and walked around the corner to the Royal Australian Air Force (RAAF) recruiting office, where he enlisted.

Less than two months after the Japanese attack on Pearl Harbor in December 1941, Miller was called to active service. He trained at No. 4 Initial Training School, at Victor Harbor in South Australia, and gained his wings in late 1942. He played only one match during the 1942 football season, while posted in South Australia. In December, he was promoted to the rank of flight sergeant and, a month later, he sailed to Europe. The journey included a stopover at a training camp in Boston in the United States, where Miller met his future wife Peg Wagner. In March, he was deployed to Bournemouth, in England, where he continued his training.

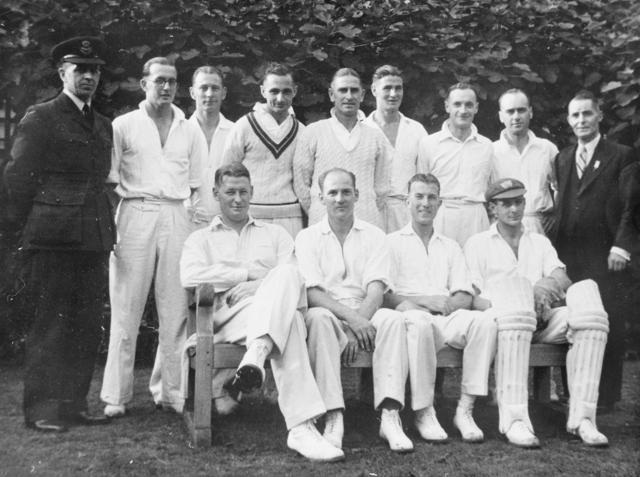
The team for the first RAAF match. Miller is standing sixth from left.

Miller was invited to join a RAAF team in London. The team was officially formed in preparation for the 1943 season and Miller's selection led to the first of many brushes with death: in April, while away with the team, some of his comrades were killed in a German air strike. Miller played his first match at Lord's against Warner's XI, a team that featured past, current and future England players, including Bob Wyatt, Gubby Allen, Trevor Bailey and Alec Bedser. Miller top-scored in the first innings with 45 and added 21 not out, with two sixes, in the second innings. The RAAF played eight matches that season and Miller's top score was 141 against Public School Wanderers. He went on to play for Dominions against Warner's XI in August, scoring 32 and two. The match marked the first meeting between Miller and his good friend, England batsman Denis Compton and his bowling began to attract media attention. In the final match of the season at Lord's between the RAAF and the Royal Air Force, Miller took 3/23 and scored 91. The success of RAAF and Dominions that season, especially the attractive batting by Miller and Keith Carmody, prompted Warner to begin planning for a "Test" series between the respective armed services of England and Australia.

By late 1943, Miller was based in Gloucestershire. One night, he threatened to punch his commanding officer, resulting in his being sentenced for insubordination to a three-week disciplinary course with hard labour. In mid-November, he was posted to Ouston near Newcastle upon Tyne where he trained in the used of radar. During his stay there, Miller sustained a back injury during a wrestling match: the injury was to cause him recurring and enduring problems, particularly diminishing his ability to bowl.

In 1944, Miller was again selected for the RAAF team. In a match against the British Civil Defence Services at Lord's in July, Miller reached his century just as a V-1 flying bomb landed nearby. In a match against an England XI, Miller scored 85 in 100 minutes. He then took match figures of 6/28 against the West of England at Bristol.

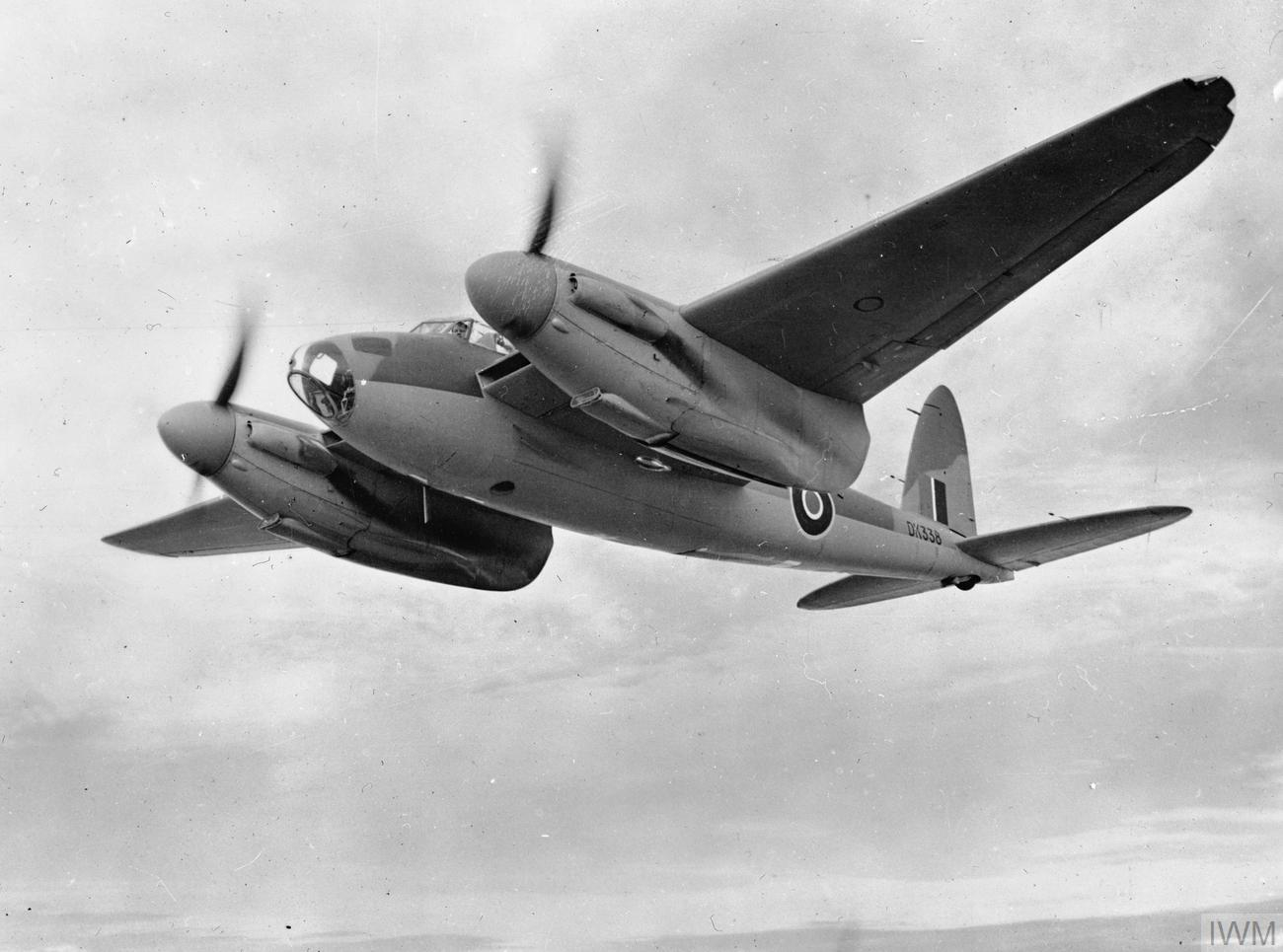
A Mosquito, the type of aircraft piloted by Miller during World War II

After ten months of training, Miller was offered a commission as a pilot officer, and was posted to No. 12 (Pilots) Advanced Flying Unit in Grantham, Lincolnshire, on 15 August 1944, then moving on to Cranfield, Bedfordshire. On a trip back to Ouston to visit former comrades, a night of drunken revelry saw Miller charged with eight offences and facing possible dishonourable discharge. Luckily for Miller, his new commanding officer (CO) was his old CO from Ouston; Miller escaped with a fine.

While training, Miller flew Beauforts, Beaufighters and Mosquitos. He had another near death experience: mechanical problems forced him to make an emergency landing of his Beaufighter. The plane was repaired for use by others, but, on its next flight, the pilot was killed when the problem recurred. On another occasion, Miller avoided colliding with a hangar by centimetres. He then escaped death by skipping a social appointment; a V1 bomb hit the venue and killed many of the patrons. In October, he went AWL to watch a concert and was summarily discharged, but the CO revoked his decision after Miller agreed to play for his cricket team. At the end of his officer training, Miller was sent aboard a Royal Navy destroyer as part of an exchange program between the forces. During a mission to Belgium, the vessel fought a German U-boat, which was sunk. Upon his return to England, Miller was promoted to flying officer on 4 November 1944.

In March 1945, Miller was deployed to the RAF station at Great Massingham in Norfolk, East Anglia. He was assigned to 169 Squadron, flying Mosquito fighter-bombers. Miller's squadron took part in missions against targets on mainland Europe in April and May 1945. They attacked V-1 and V-2 production and test launch sites on the island of Peenemünde in the Baltic Sea. On 19 April, Miller took part in an attack on a German installation at Flensburg in northern Germany. In May, his squadron was deployed to attack Westerland Airfield on the island of Sylt. One of Miller's bombs failed to release and dangled from a wing but once again he escaped death as the bomb did not explode when it fell off during the landing. Miller's next mission was delayed by poor weather, by which time Germany had surrendered. His commanding officer ordered him to fly air force personnel over Germany to view the results of Allied bombing. On one flight, Miller broke away from the flying formation and returned to base late because he wanted to fly over Bonn, the birthplace of Beethoven.

Miller's wartime exploits were to give him a greater sense of perspective when he returned to the sports field. When asked many years later by Michael Parkinson, about pressure in cricket, Miller responded: "Pressure is a Messerschmitt up your arse, playing cricket is not".

=== Victory Tests ===
The end of the war prompted the belated start of the 1945 cricket season. Miller returned to Lord's and scored 50 for the RAAF against a British Empire XI. Warner had organised a celebratory series of matches between England and Australian servicemen, known as the Victory Tests. Australian cricket administrators did not accredit the three-day matches as Tests. England was close to full strength, so the Second Australian Imperial Force and the RAAF teams merged to form the Australian Services cricket team under the leadership of Warrant Officer Hassett. The First Victory Test was at Lord's and was expected to usher in a new post-war era, which cricket watchers hoped would be more attractive to watch. England batted first and Miller bowled his Great Massingham colleague Bill Edrich to end with 1/11 and precipitate an English collapse. Miller came to the crease at and helped Australia take the lead, before cutting loose, eventually finishing with 105 in 210 minutes. The Times opined that his innings was "as good a century as has been seen at Lord's in many a long day". Australia went on to win by six wickets.

Miller warmed up for the Second Victory Test by top-scoring for the RAAF against Lancashire and the RAF. In the Test, played at Bramall Lane, Miller went wicketless and scored 17 in the first innings. In the second innings, Miller bowled a fierce spell, hitting Test world record holder Len Hutton and Cyril Washbrook on the arm and head respectively, provoking an angry crowd reaction. At the time, Miller had a leisurely attitude towards bowling, so his success led to calls for him to start taking it seriously, instead of simply jogging in and releasing the ball. Despite this, Australia lost the match.

In the meantime, Miller earned the further ire of his CO by flying unauthorised leisure flights. Not wanting to fly tour flights over Germany, Miller lodged bogus reports saying that the Mosquitoes were malfunctioning, causing unnecessary maintenance work. Thus, the CO ordered Miller to take his plane instead, which caught fire. With one functional engine, Miller came back to the air base and bellylanded. The plane broke apart and caught fire, but Miller escaped physical injury and was playing sport an hour later.

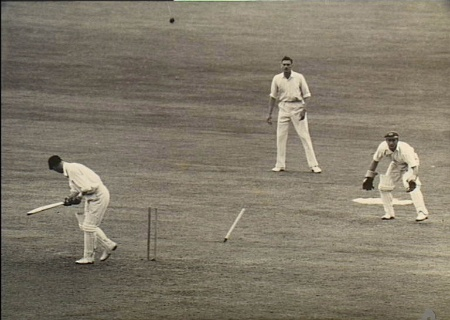
Len Hutton's off stump has just been knocked out by Miller during the Third Victory Test.

The next day, Miller headed to Lord's to play for the RAAF against the South of England. Chasing 208, Miller scored an unbeaten 78 in 95 minutes, but rain washed out the match. In the first innings of Third Victory Test at Lord's, when finally called upon to bowl, Miller measured out a run-up and removed John Dewes, Donald Carr and Hutton, all bowled. He ended with 3/44. Miller was rewarded with the new ball in the second innings. He removed Dewes, Edrich and Dick Pollard to end with 3/42. This left Australia a target of 225. Miller saw Australia to the target, unbeaten on 71. In the Fourth Test, again at Lord's, Miller scored 118 in the first innings, before an unbeaten 25 in the second innings ensured a draw. The tremendous public reception of the Victory Tests resulted in a fifth match being added to the schedule.

In the meantime Japan had surrendered, and No. 169 Squadron was disbanded. Miller had spent around 550 hours in the air with the RAF, to which his RAAF unit had been seconded. He was awarded the 1939–45 Star, France and Germany Star, Defence Medal, War Medal 1939–1945 and Australia Service Medal 1939–45.

In the Fifth Victory Test, under overcast conditions against a swinging and seaming ball, Miller struck 14 from his first over and finished 77 not out, in a display that featured strong cutting and driving. Australia could manage only 173, and England were on top. Miller took one wicket with the ball but managed only four in the second innings as England won, to square the series 2–2. Hassett wrote at the end of the series that "This is cricket as it should be... let's have no more talk of "war" in cricket". Miller topped the batting averages for the series, with 443 runs at 63.28. His aggregate exceeded those of Hammond and Hutton, and he also took 10 wickets at 27.70. Of Miller's batting, Hassett said that "as a strokeplayer he is second to none", and his performance earned comparisons to Jack Gregory, who had a similar breakthrough after World War I.

The last big match of the season was a one-off match at Lord's between England and "Dominions", a scratch team of players from the British Commonwealth. Miller managed 26 in the Dominions' first innings of 307, before cutting loose in the second innings. After settling in, he hit Eric Hollies for two sixes, including one that hit the top of the roof. The next day, he registered his century in 115 minutes, clouting another five balls over the boundary in the morning session. In one 35-minute passage of play, he and Learie Constantine added 91 runs, before Miller departed for 185, made in just 165 minutes. The Dominions went on to win by 45 runs in a match described by Wisden as "one of the finest ever seen". Commenting on Miller' innings, Robertson-Glasgow said "From the moment he takes guard he plays each ball just that much below its supposed merits that scratches a bowler's pride". Miller had enjoyed his visit to the home of cricket. In eight innings at Lord's for the season, he had scored 568 runs at 94.68, with three centuries.

The season ended with a few more matches against English counties. Miller struck aggressive half-centuries in wins against Nottinghamshire and Leveson-Gower's XI. In first-class matches, Miller had scored 725 runs at 72.50 for the season, finishing second in both averages and aggregates. The success of the Australian Services prompted a fundraising tour of India and Ceylon on their return to Australia.

=== Services tour of India ===
Miller, the vice-captain, almost missed the trip to India after turning up late for the voyage. On arrival in India, Miller scored 46 in a draw against North Zone. Miller then captained the Australians in a match against West Zone in Bombay, top-scoring with 106 in a high-scoring draw. In a match against India, Miller took two wickets. At this point, with most of the team suffering from dysentery and the leadership not permitting the team to travel by air, some of the RAAF personnel felt that Hassett should be removed from the captaincy, Miller being one of the candidates to replace him. This would have increased his prospects of leading Australia. Miller refused to plot against Hassett and the dispute ended when a RAAF plane was acquired to transport the team.

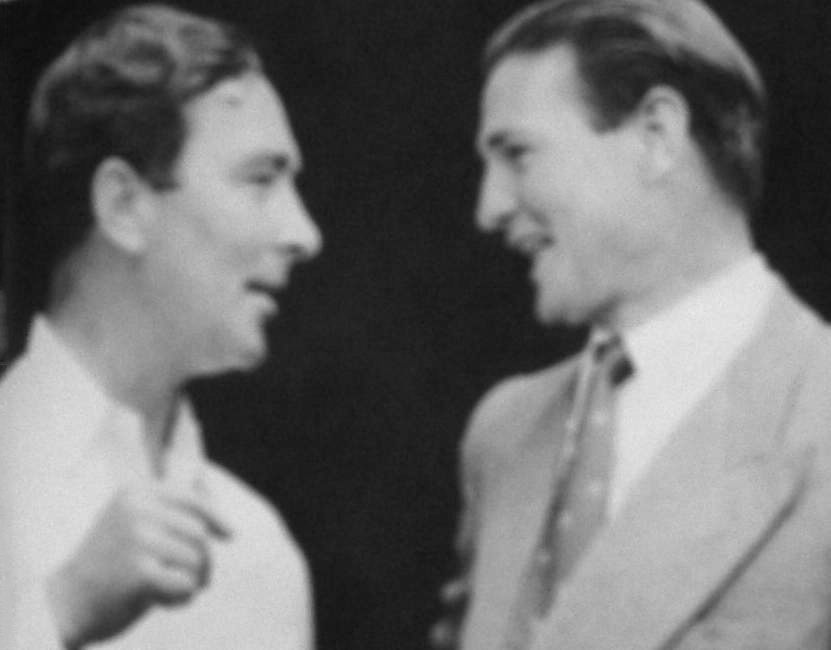
Compton (l) and Miller (r)

The team played East Zone in Calcutta as the city was in the grip of deadly pro-independence riots. Miller's friend, Denis Compton, was batting for East Zone when rioters invaded the pitch. Their leader ran up to Compton and said: "Mr Compton, you very good player, but you must stop". In later years, whenever Miller opposed Compton, he would quote this remark when Compton came to the crease. In 2005, the ECB and Cricket Australia decided that the player adjudged the Player of the Series in the Ashes would be awarded the Compton–Miller Medal, recognising their friendship and rivalry.

In the second match against India, Services were 2/250 in response to India's 386 when Miller came in and scored 82, including four sixes in five balls. The match ended in a draw and Miller aggravating an injury. Miller took 3/19 against South Zone in Madras, the Australians' only win in India. He failed with the bat in the third and final match against India, scoring two and seven, but he took 2/60 in the first innings as India took the series 1–0. Overall, Miller had a disappointing series in the international matches, with 107 runs at 26.25 and four wickets at 40.50. Australia's final match was in Colombo against an All Ceylon team. Miller scored 132 as Australia won by an innings.

=== Services in Australia ===
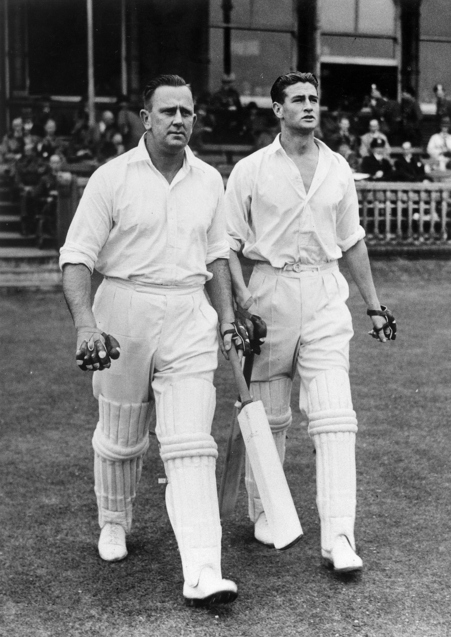
Miller walks out to bat with Services teammate Cec Pepper.

Upon returning to Australia, Hassett's men were assigned to play a further six first-class matches against the state teams. The fixtures were meant to revive cricket and were also used as a lead-up to the international tour to New Zealand in March 1946. Miller started his campaign with 80 against Western Australia. He finally returned to Melbourne in January, before taking on Victoria. Miller top-scored in both innings with 37 and 59 in an innings defeat.

Miller had another difficult time against New South Wales, as the state side made 7/551 and Miller went wicketless. When the servicemen batted, they faced an attack featuring leading leg spinner Bill O'Reilly and paceman Ray Lindwall, the fastest in Australia. Miller was on 74 as Services limped to 9/171. With only one partner left, Miller attacked, scoring 31 of the last 33 runs to end unbeaten on 105, and earning plaudits among cricket pundits on Australian soil. Former leading Test batsman Alan Kippax opined that "Australia has unearthed a new champion", and O'Reilly said that Miller's century was "one of the best hundreds ever got against me". Miller compiled 46 in the second innings as the Servicemen fell to another innings defeat. Miller finished the season with 4/49 against Queensland and a pair of fifties against Tasmania.

== Test career ==
=== Test debut ===
At the end of the season, Miller was selected for the New Zealand tour, under the captaincy of Queensland's Bill Brown. Miller started the tour well, top-scoring with 139 against Auckland. Along with seven other debutants, Miller made his test debut in the match against New Zealand at the Basin Reserve in Wellington, a match that was retrospectively accorded Test status in 1948. On a sticky wicket, New Zealand won the toss and batted. Miller was not required to bowl in the first innings as O'Reilly and Ernie Toshack skittled the home side for just 42. Australia made 8/199 with Miller scoring 30. He was allowed to take the new ball in the second innings, taking 2/6 in six overs before a flare-up of his back injury forced him to be removed from the attack. Australia bowled their hosts out for 54, securing an innings victory.

Despite the scare over his back complaint, Miller returned from New Zealand to play in the 1946 season, which turned out to be his last season in the VFL; St Kilda finished second-last. Miller played with more aggression than during his pre-war years and his high leaping marks were a noted feature of a season that saw him chosen to represent Victoria against South Australia. Miller thus became one of the few players to play at the highest levels of both cricket and Australian rules football.

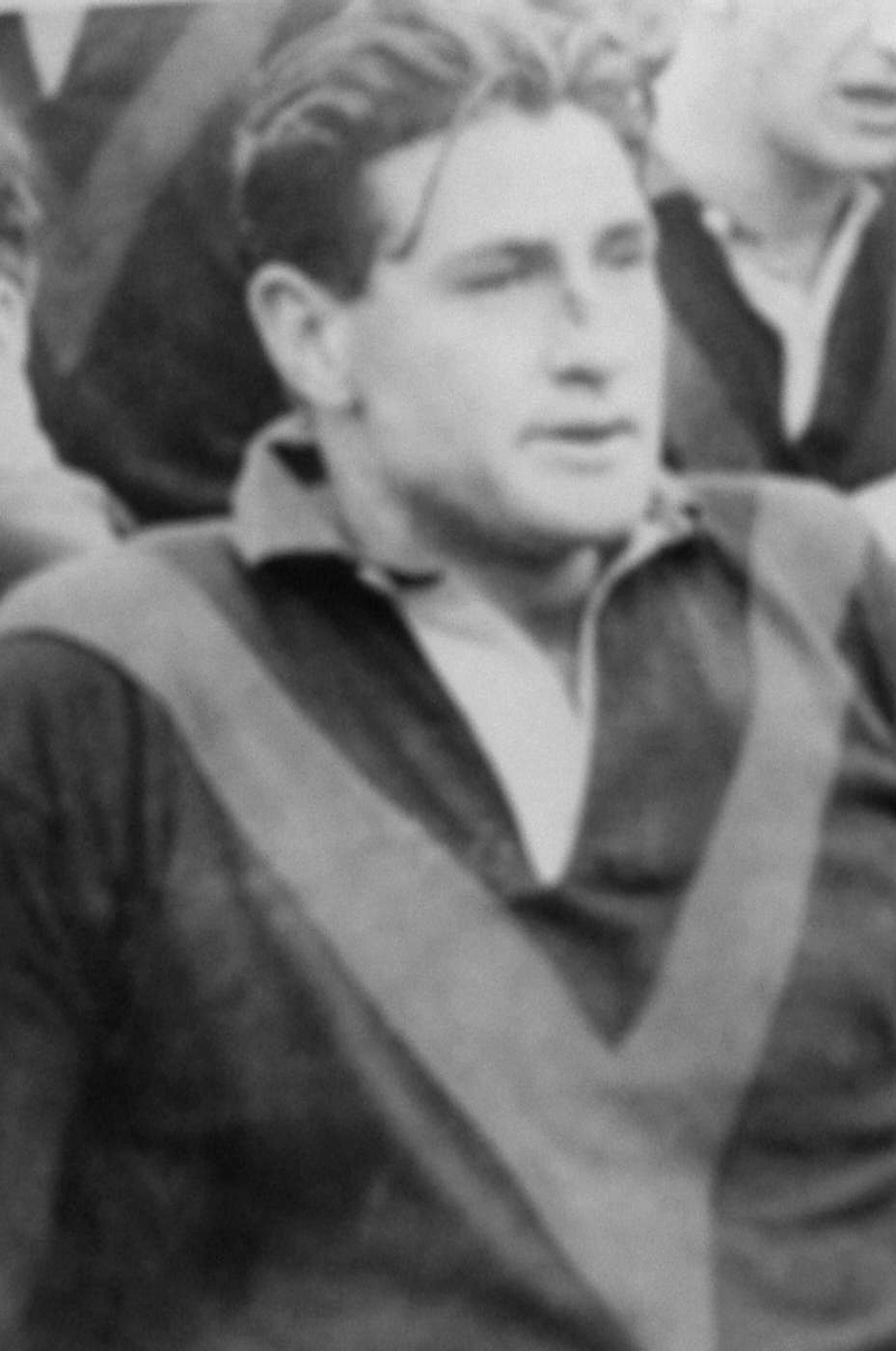
Miller sporting a cut nose during a football match

Miller was discharged from the RAAF on 26 June 1946, and returned to his job at Vacuum Oil. Miller resented the fact that many of his colleagues had avoided the hazards of war and moved steadily up the ladder and regarded his job as demeaning. Under such circumstances, Miller contemplated quitting Australian cricket and accepting a professional contract with Rawtenstall in the Lancashire League, valued at £1,000 per year, for three seasons. With advertising and commercial commitments likely to triple this figure, playing in England would have been approximately ten times more lucrative than continuing in Australia. Miller was worried that his impulsive style would be curtailed by the pressures of professionalism. At that time, the Board of Control's policy stipulated that any player that signed with a professional league in England could not represent Australia. Miller's contract would see him in England until he was 30, effectively ending his career for Australia. Furthermore, it would have prevented him from playing Australian football during the winter. Miller weighed it up and opted to sign the contract that tied him to Rawtenstall, his duties to start with the onset of the English season in April 1947.

In the meantime, Miller had the upcoming Test series against England in 1946–47 to look forward to. He therefore approached his employers for two months leave so that he could travel to the United States to marry Wagner, which would allow him time to return in preparation for the international series. Vacuum Oil refused, so, with the comfort of job security in England, Miller resigned.

Miller played football for the Sydney club, based at Trumper Park, during 1947 and for NSW against Queensland in Brisbane. He left Australia at the end of the football season in late August, amid press speculation that he might not return. He was reunited in Boston with Wagner after more than three years of separation and they married on 21 September 1946. Miller and his new bride returned to Australia in November. In the meantime, his contract with Rawtenstall became public knowledge and he was threatened with his Test career being terminated if he began playing for the English team.

=== First Ashes series ===
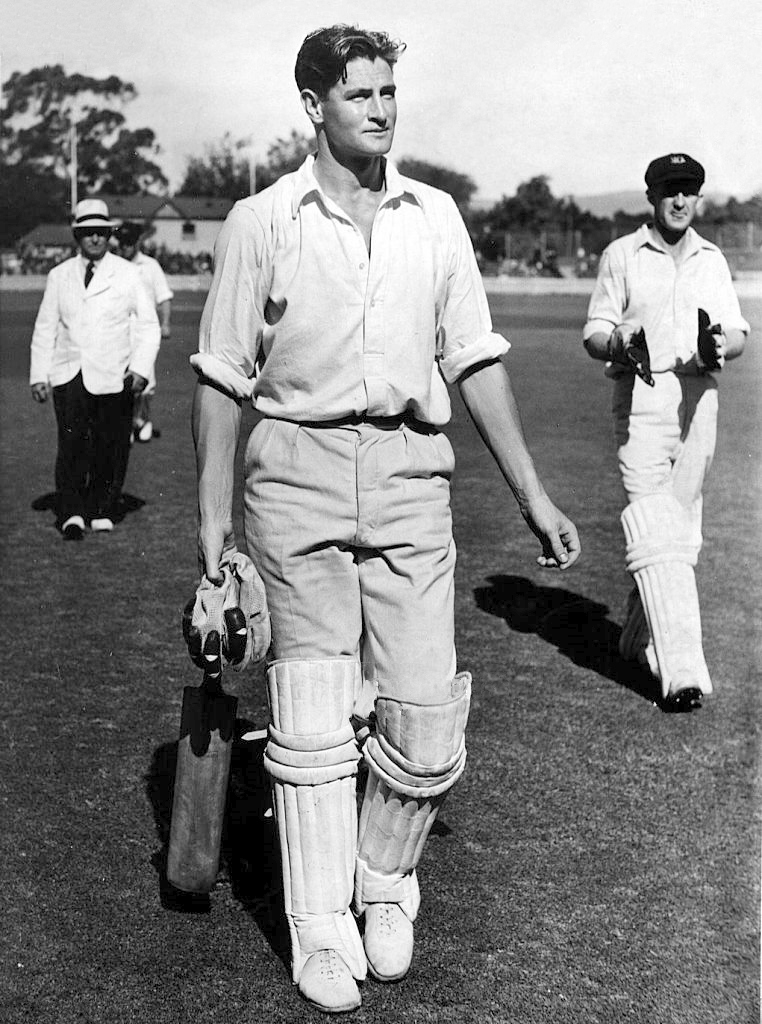
Miller after making 188 for Victoria at the Adelaide Oval, 21 November 1946

Miller's season started amid ongoing speculation about whether he would fulfil his contract with Rawtenstall. Miller remained silent. In a Shield match in front of Bradman at the Adelaide Oval, Miller struck form with 188 and 2/32 with the ball. Wisden said Miller's innings was "one of the finest batting displays ever seen at Adelaide". Bradman saw Miller as a top-order batsman and as the new ball partner for Lindwall. Although Miller was a reluctant bowler, Bradman felt that he was crucial to his strategy of attacking England's strong batting line-up with express pace.

Miller made his Ashes debut in the first Test in Brisbane. Bradman opted for six front-line bowlers, with Miller as high as number five in the batting order. Australia batted first, Miller coming in at 3/322. He played aggressively to reach his fifty in just 80 minutes, striking a six onto the roof of the members' stand at long on, the biggest hit at the ground at the time, before being trapped leg before wicket by Doug Wright for 79 as Australia made 645. Miller was given the new ball along with Lindwall and he took his first Ashes wicket, bowling Hutton as England closed at 1/21. The following day, the pitch had turned into a sticky wicket following a heavy tropical storm. Miller bowled off breaks at medium pace and mixed in a large amount of bouncers. On the unpredictable surface, Edrich was struck around 40 times on the body. Miller cut through the English top order, removing Edrich, Washbrook, Compton and Jack Ikin on the fourth morning, finishing with 7/60 as England made 141 and were forced to follow on. Miller took two wickets, including the dismissal of Hutton with first ball of the second innings as England fell to defeat by an innings and 334 runs and Miller had match figures of 9/77.

During that first Test, an incident occurred, coloured by Miller's wartime service, that soured his relationship with Bradman and his feelings towards Test cricket. Michael Parkinson described it as follows:

Keith Miller was deeply affected by the Second World War. It changed him ... In the first post-war Ashes Test ... England were caught on a sticky ... [and] Bill Edrich came in. He'd had a serious war and he survived and Miller thought, "He's my old Services mate. The last thing he wants after five years' war is to be flattened by a cricket ball, so I eased up. Bradman came up to me and said, 'Don't slow down, Keith. Bowl quicker.' That remark put me off Test cricket. Never felt the same way about it after that."

In the Second Test in Sydney. Miller had a quiet match, scoring 40 and taking one wicket on a spin-friendly pitch as Australia secured another innings victory, but showed he was in prime batting form when he returned to the Sheffield Shield. Playing against New South Wales, he hammered three sixes in one over and made 153 of a 271-run partnership with Merv Harvey in just over three hours, setting up an innings victory. Bill Ponsford said that it was the hardest hitting he had ever seen. The Third Test was Miller's first in his home town. He had a mediocre game in a drawn match, scoring 33 and 34, and taking two wickets.

Off the pitch, Miller privately decided that he would not honour his Rawtenstall contract. He secretly accepted an offer to relocate to Sydney to work as a liquor salesman and play cricket. Back in a good frame of mind for the Fourth Test in Adelaide, Miller took one wicket in each innings, but he shone with the bat. After England had made 460, Miller came in at 3/207, and was 23 not out by the close of the second day. He hit the first ball of the next day for six, and accumulated 67 runs in the opening 71 minutes, to reach his maiden Test century. The Englishmen utilised leg theory to prevent easy scoring, but as the tail began to be dismissed, Miller accelerated, launching drives into the crowd, despite the presence of four men on the fence. Miller ended unbeaten on 141 but the match petered out into a high-scoring draw. Before the last Test, Miller played for Victoria against England, taking 4/65.

The Fifth Test. saw Miller take a wicket in each innings. Australia were left a target of 214 runs on a wearing wicket. Wright beat Miller with three consecutive leg breaks, but Miller survived and struck consecutive boundaries on the way to reaching the target. Australia had taken the series 3–0; Miller scored 384 runs at 76.80 and took 16 wickets at 20.88, which placed him second in both the batting and bowling averages, to Bradman and Lindwall respectively. Nevertheless, Miller had become disillusioned with Bradman's ruthless mentality. Miller was impulsive and cared little for records or ruthlessly dominating his opponents, preferring to play in a flamboyant manner in close contests.

For the 1947–48 Australian season, Miller transferred to New South Wales (NSW), for whom he played the remainder of his Sheffield Shield career. He also represented the New South Wales interstate football team at the 1947 Hobart Carnival, as vice captain. This made him one of the few players to play both football and cricket for two states.

Miller had a light workload in the 1947–48 home Test series against India, who were on their first tour to Australia. India were well beaten, losing 4–0, three of the four defeats by an innings. Miller was required to bat just once in each Test, accumulating 185 runs at 37.00, including two half-centuries, while the batsmen ahead of him plundered the bowling. His bowling duties were also light; his 72 overs yielded nine wickets at 24.78. In both his fifties, Miller featured in century partnerships with his partners, respectively Bradman and Hassett in the First and Fourth test respectively. His 58 in the First Test at Brisbane featured many big hits.

=== Invincibles tour ===
Donald Bradman's 1948 touring party to England has become known to cricket history as The Invincibles, remaining undefeated in its 31 matches. Miller started the tour strongly, scoring a hard-hitting 50 not out against Worcestershire, and an unbeaten 202 against Leicestershire. In the next match against Yorkshire, Miller took 6/42, including the prized wicket of Hutton, as the home team were demolished for just 71. Australia then struggled to 101, including a counterattacking 34 from Miller, who took 3/49 in the second innings in an Australian victory.

In a later match, against Essex, Miller was involved in a famous incident that is frequently cited when his character is discussed; it also spotlighted his differences with Bradman. On a day when the Australians set a world-record of 721 runs in a single day, Miller came to the crease with his side already dominating, with the score 2/364. He deliberately allowed himself to be bowled first ball, much to Bradman's displeasure, in a protest against the one-sided nature of the contest.

Australia then took on the MCC at Lord's; effectively a dress rehearsal for the Tests as many of England's Test players were in the MCC team. Miller scored 163 in 250 minutes, hitting 20 fours and three sixes in another innings win. Soon after, Rawtenstall dropped the contract dispute with Miller after being offered compensation.

Following another good all-round performance against Hampshire, top-scoring in the first innings and taking 5/25 in the second, Miller went into the First Test (at Trent Bridge) in fine form. On the first morning, Miller bowled Hutton and Compton on his way to 3/38, helping Australia dismiss England cheaply and seize the initiative. Miller scored a duck, but Australia took a 344-run lead on the first innings. In the second innings, he resumed his battle with Hutton and Compton, delivering five bouncers in the last over of the day. The batsmen survived, but Miller received a hostile reaction from the crowd. The next day, he bowled Hutton for 74 and then bounced Compton, causing him to fall onto his stumps for 184. Australia won by eight wickets, Miller ending with 4/125 for the second innings and 7/163 for the match.

Miller was unfit to bowl during the Second Test at Lord's. During England's first innings, Bradman threw Miller the ball, hoping that he would reverse his decision not to bowl. Miller refused and returned the ball, citing his back. Miller's action generated news headlines, journalists believing that he had disobeyed Bradman. His batting ability, however, was such that he played as a specialist batsman even when he was unable to bowl due to injury, such as during the Second Test. Miller wanted to play purely as a batsman, feeling that the workload of bowling would hinder his run-scoring. However, Bradman was intent on going through the tour undefeated, and utilised his bowling options to the full, to maximise the Australians’ chances of winning. Lindwall and Miller were the first-choice pace duo, regarded as one of the greatest speed pairings in the history of cricket, whereas the latter was just one of many accomplished batsmen in the team. As a result, the Australian skipper valued Miller more as an opening bowler. He ended the Tests with 184 runs at 26.28 and 13 wickets at 23.15 from 138.1 overs and took eight catches.

As a batsman, Miller was out for four in the first innings, not offering a shot to an inswinger. In the second innings, Miller's first ball was a hat-trick ball from English captain Norman Yardley; he survived a loud leg before wicket appeal and then hit a six into the grandstand, on his way to 74. Australia declared at 7/460, 595 runs ahead. Miller took three catches as Australia won by 409 runs.

After the Lord's Test, Miller enjoyed a night out and returned to the team hotel after daybreak the next morning. Australia were due to play Surrey at The Oval that day. With Australia in the field, Bradman sent Miller to the fine leg boundary as a punishment—between overs, he was forced to walk the length of the field. One of the spectators felt sorry for Miller and lent him his bicycle, which Miller used to cycle around the circumference of the ground.

The efforts of Miller and Lindwall against Hutton had led the English selectors to drop the Yorkshireman for the Third Test. The Australians were surprised by the move and thought that it was a bad move by their opponents. Miller had a quiet Third Test at Old Trafford, taking one wicket and scoring 31 as the match ended in a draw. In a rain-shortened match, Miller again earned the ire of the crowd, after aiming a series of bouncers at Edrich, in apparent retaliation to the Englishman's bouncing of Lindwall. He struck Edrich on the body before Bradman ordered him to stop.

When fit, Miller opened the Test bowling with Lindwall, and the pair bowled in short and fiery bursts with the new ball. The English cricket authorities had agreed to make a new ball available every 55 overs. The pre-existing rule stipulated that a replacement ball would be available every 200 runs, which usually took much more time to accumulate. This played directly into the hands of the Australians with their vastly stronger pace attack, as a new ball is ideal for fast bowling. Bradman thus wanted to preserve his two first-choice bowlers for a fresh attack every 55 overs. With 13 wickets in the Tests, Miller was third among the Australians behind Lindwall and Johnston, who took 27 apiece. Owing to his fragility, Miller was used sparingly compared to the other four Australian frontline bowlers: Toshack and Johnson each delivered more than 170 overs despite playing in one less Test, while Lindwall bowled 224 and Johnston 306 in five matches. In all first-class matches, Miller took 56 wickets at 17.58 and held onto 20 catches. There were many consecutive matches during the tour with no intervening rest day, so Bradman ensured that his leading pace duo remained fresh for the new ball bursts in the Tests by giving them a smaller proportion of the bowling during the tour matches. During all first-class matches, Johnston bowled 851.1 overs, Johnson 668, Lindwall 573.4 and Toshack 502, while Miller bowled only 429.4 overs. Doug Ring—who was only selected in one Test—bowled 542.4 overs, while all rounders Colin McCool and Loxton bowled 399.4 and 361.2 overs respectively. McCool did not play in any Tests, while Loxton was only entrusted with 63 overs against England. As such, in some tour matches, Miller was not asked to bowl at all, in order to keep him fresh for the Tests.

The teams moved to Headingley for the Fourth Test at Leeds. Hutton had been recalled and the home team batted first. England tallied 496 and Miller took 1/43. In reply, Australia were struggling at 3/68 in reply on the third morning. Neil Harvey, playing his first Ashes Test, joined Miller at the crease. The pair launched a counterattack, with Miller taking the lead. He hoisted Jim Laker's first ball over square leg for six. Miller struck consecutive sixes over long off and the sightscreen respectively. This allowed Australia to seize the initiative; Harvey joined in and hit consecutive boundaries against Laker. Miller then lifted another six over long off, and another over long on from Norman Yardley. He was dismissed for 58 attempting another six. The partnership had yielded 121 runs in only 90 minutes, and was described by Wisden as a "hurricane". John Arlott described the innings as the most memorable that he had witnessed. He said "Miller played like an emperor ... Every stroke would have been memorable but each one had bettered its predecessor". Jack Fingleton said that he had never "known a more enjoyable hour" of "delectable cricket". The momentum swung and Australia finished at 457 on the fourth day, having added almost 396 in one day's play. Miller took 1/53 in the second innings as Australia were set a world record chase of 404 on the final day. He made only 12 but Australia broke the world record to take a 3–0 lead.

The Australians moved onto the next match against Derbyshire, where Miller scored a half-century and took 3/31 in an innings victory. Against Glamorgan, Miller took two wickets before striking a hard-hitting 84 with five sixes. He struck one of the sixes with one hand, sending it 20 rows into the crowd. In a match against Lancashire, Jack Ikin had reached 99 despite being repeatedly hit. Miller refused to bowl to Ikin, saying that he felt the batsman deserved a century. Lindwall was given the ball and promptly removed Ikin for 99.

The teams proceeded to The Oval for the Fifth Test. After England elected to bat, Miller bowled John Dewes with his second ball and then removed Jack Crapp without scoring, leaving England at 4/23. Miller ended with 2/5 as Lindwall (6/20) cut down the home team for 52. In his last Test innings for the summer, Miller scored five. Australia led by 337 on the first innings and Miller dismissed Hutton and Crapp to end with 2/22 as Australia won by an innings and took a 4–0 series win. Miller ended the Tests with 184 runs at 26.28 and 13 wickets at 23.15. He took eight catches.

In a match against the Gentlemen of England at Lord's, Miller scored 69 and was dismissed attempting a third consecutive hooked boundary. Australia went through the remaining tour matches unbeaten to end the summer without a defeat.

After the tour, Bradman was full of praise for Miller, though somewhat critical of his aggressive batting:

One of the most volatile cricketers of any age. Long, rangy, athletic type—drove the ball with tremendous power—tried to hit sixes with abandon. Many of them would have been prodigious. Would have been a far better player had he curbed this propensity and showed more judgement in his hitting. Dangerous bowler with the new ball, swinging it both ways not much short of [Ray] Lindwall's speed. [...] In 1948 he was the best slip field in the world. Altogether, a crowd-pleasing personality ... whose limitations were caused mainly by his own failure to concentrate.

— Don Bradman,

Miller totalled 1,088 runs for the tour at an average of 47.30, only the eighth highest in the squad. He took 56 wickets at 17.58 and held onto 20 catches.

Bradman criticised Miller's hitting of sixes (26), feeling that his mercurial all rounder lacked restraint and concentration. In contrast, Fingleton praised Miller's attitude to cricket, saying "He is never one to accept runs when they are there for the taking ... I acknowledge myself the supreme believer in Miller as a cricketer. He had given me joy in the game approached by others." With respect to his persistent bouncing of Hutton and Compton, Fingleton said that it was up to England to develop bowlers of express pace—which they lacked at the time—to retaliate against or deter the Australians from pursuing such tactics. Miller's persistent disagreements with Bradman soon caught up with him, despite the latter's retirement after the tour. During Bradman's testimonial match, Miller bowled three consecutive bouncers at his retired captain, dismissing him with the last of these and drawing an angry look. Bradman was one of three members of the national selection panel, and Miller was dropped for the next series against South Africa in 1949–50. Although Bradman denied voting for the omission, most of the players in the team did not believe this.

=== Omission for South Africa ===
After returning to Australia, Miller played against Bradman in a testimonial match in 1948–49. Miller bowled three consecutive bouncers at Bradman, dismissing him with the last of the short-pitched deliveries for 53. Bradman was angered by Miller's bowling. One week later, the squad to tour South Africa in the following season was announced, and Miller was omitted, despite being ranked as the best all rounder in the world. During the Australian season, which was a purely domestic one, he had scored 400 runs at 33.33 and taken 11 wickets at 24.09. He scored one century against Queensland during the season, as well as a 99 against Victoria at the SCG. The surprise omission led to much conjecturing about the reasoning. One was that Miller had stated during the season that he did not want to bowl, so the selectors only considered his batting performances. Another was that Miller's bouncing of Bradman had provoked his former captain into voting against him at the selection table. Rumours circulated that new captain Lindsay Hassett did not want Miller on the tour because he was undisciplined, which Hassett denied. Another was that Jack Ryder, the Victorian selector and former Australian captain, had voted against Miller in retaliation for his move to New South Wales. Both Bradman and Chappie Dwyer claimed they voted for Miller, leading Miller to quip "somebody's telling lies", as there were only three on the selection panel.

The media stridently criticised Miller's omission, as did former players such as Stan McCabe and Alan Kippax. During the off season, he worked as a journalist and played baseball, but declined a trial with a Major League Baseball club, the Boston Red Sox. Miller captained New South Wales at the start of the 1949–50 season as his colleagues went to South Africa, his first leadership experience in the Sheffield Shield. He scored 80 and took six wickets in the first match against Queensland. After another victory over Western Australia, he received a request from the Australian Board of Control. At the request of captain Hassett, Miller was asked to tour South Africa as cover for Johnston, who had been injured in a car crash. Miller accepted the offer and resigned himself to bowling heavily. Miller almost missed the trip after arriving late at the dock in Perth after a drunken night. The next boat to South Africa would not have departed for several weeks. Despite his recall, there remained tension over his initial omission, as Dwyer was the team manager.

Miller was given the responsibility of batting in the number three position when Hassett was afflicted by tonsillitis. In the First Test at Johannesburg, Miller scored 21 and then took 5/40 in South Africa's first innings, only his second match on tour, resulting in the home side being forced to follow on and lose by an innings. In the Second Test at Cape Town, he scored 58 and then took 3/54 in the first innings. On the third morning, Miller crashed his car and arrived late to the ground, still putting on his trousers as he entered the playing field. Despite, this he dismissed Dudley Nourse with his third ball. He was wicketless in the second innings, and took only one in the Third Test in Durban and did not pass 10 with the bat. Australia won both matches. He returned to the form in the Fourth Test with 84, 33 not out and 3/75 in a high scoring draw. Miller took match figures of 5/66 in the Fifth Test as Australia took the series 4–0. He ended the series with 246 runs at 41.00 and 17 wickets at 22.94, placing in the top six in the Test averages for bat and ball. During the tour matches, he took match figures of 11/54 against Natal Country Districts and scored a century against Transvaal.

=== Ashes in Australia ===
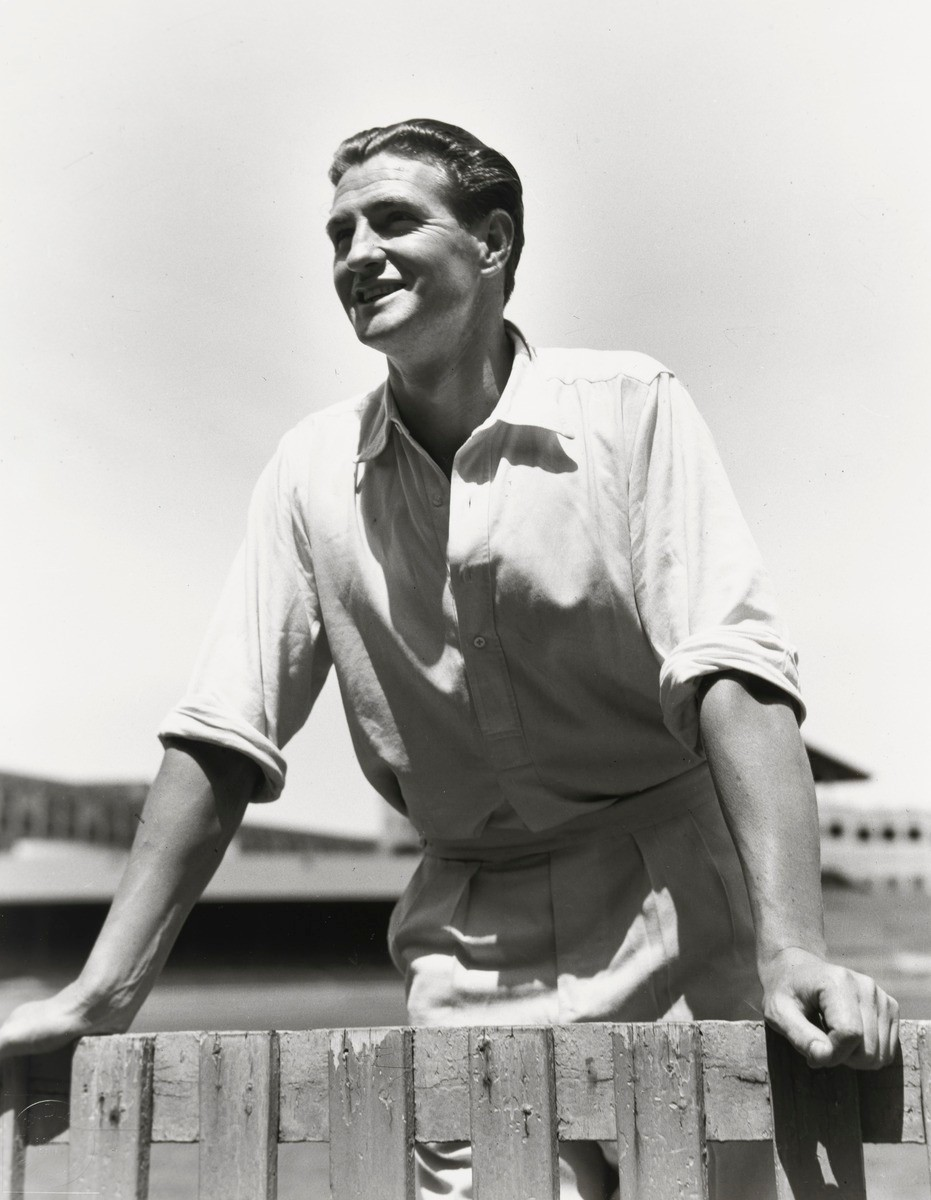
Miller photographed by Max Dupain c. 1950

Miller started the 1950–51 season with an unbeaten 201 in a Shield match against Queensland. At 438 minutes, it was his longest first-class innings. In the return match, he scored 138 not out in just 118 minutes in a successful run-chase, a sharp contrast to his double-century. In a tour match against the visiting England team at the SCG before the Test series, Miller scored 214, having been 99 not out at stumps on the previous day. He hit 15 fours and three sixes. He made ducks in consecutive matches leading into the First Test in Brisbane. Miller scored 15 and eight on a rain-affected pitch, and took match figures of 3/50 in an Australian victory, dismissing Dewes twice. He had another quiet match in the Second Test, scoring 18 and 14 and taking a match total of 2/55. After struggling in the first two Tests, Miller rediscovered his batting form with 98 against the tourists for New South Wales.

England had started the Third Test at Sydney strongly. Australia took its first wicket when Miller caught Washbrook from Johnson with a horizontal diving catch at slip. England were still in control at 1/128 when Miller came on to bowl. He removed Hutton and Reg Simpson before bowling Compton for a duck. In the space of four overs from Miller, England were now 4/137. Miller had contributed to all four wickets. Miller ended with 4/37 as England were bowled out for 290 on the second day. Miller batted patiently on the third day, reaching 96 by stumps with Australia at 6/362. The next day, with his century four runs away, Miller arrived late, leaving his batting partner Johnson waiting at the players' gate. Miller progressed to 145 not out despite the interruption. It has been a patient innings by his standards, taking almost a day. England collapsed for 123, leaving Australia to take an innings victory. In the first innings of the Fourth Test in Sydney, Miller scored 44 and did not take a wicket, but he was heading for consecutive Test centuries in the second innings. He reached 99 when a leg break from Doug Wright spun across him and clipped the off bail. The innings helped Australia to set England a target of 503. Miller took 3/27 on the final day, helping to cut through the middle order as Australia won by 274 runs. Miller was out for seven and a duck in the Fifth Test at the MCG. He took 4/76 in the first innings, joining Lindwall in cutting down the middle order, despite which England won by eight wickets. Miller topped the Test batting averages with 350 runs at 43.75, and for the entire first-class season, he scored 1332 runs at 78.35, the highest among all comers. His bowling was also strong, with 17 wickets at 17.70, second only to Jack Iverson (21 wickets at 15.23). An attack by Morris (182) and Miller (83) in a Shield match dispirited Iverson, and he never played Test cricket again.

=== West Indies tour Australia ===
The 1951–52 Australian season saw the first tour by a West Indian team in two decades. The Caribbean team had beaten England 3–1 in 1950 and were regarded as the biggest threat to Australia since Bodyline. The batting was led by the "three Ws": Everton Weekes, Frank Worrell and Clyde Walcott. The English had also been bamboozled by the leg spin and left arm orthodox of Sonny Ramadhin and Alf Valentine, who took 59 wickets between them in four Tests against England. Miller and Lindwall were charged with attacking the opposition batsmen, testing them with short-pitched bowling. The West Indies batted first in the First Test at Brisbane and were dismissed for 216; Miller dismissing their captain John Goddard. Miller came to the crease at 3/80 and could not pick Ramadhin. He decided to attack the leg spinner without picking him. He missed some, was dropped twice and hit a six before falling for 46 to Valentine. Australia scraped out a 10-run lead. Miller took another wicket in the second innings but managed only four as Australia stumbled to a three-wicket victory. Between Tests, Miller took eight wickets in the match as New South Wales beat the tourists in a tour match. In the Second Test at Sydney, Miller came to the crease at 3/106 having gone wicketless in the West Indies' first innings of 362. He began to pick Ramadhin and finished with 129 in 246 minutes. Miller and Hassett put on 235, an Australian Test record for any wicket against the West Indies. Ramadhin ended with 1/196 and was demoralised. In the second innings, Miller took 3/50 with a heavy barrage of short balls and claimed two catches to help Australia to a seven-wicket victory. Wisden decried Lindwall and Miller's "relentless bumper tactics".

Miller had a lean Third Test, taking only one wicket and scoring four and 35, as Australia lost by six wickets. In the Fourth Test at the MCG, the West Indies batted first and Miller removed both openers in the first hour, before returning to end with 5/60 as the tourists were bowled out for 272. He then scored 47 as Australia managed only 216. He took 2/49, but only scored two in Australia's run-chase of 259. The home team won by one wicket. In the Fifth Test, Miller took 5/26 in the first innings with another concentrated display of short-pitched bowling, and then scored 69 in the second innings. He took two further wickets in the second innings as Australia fell short of their target. Miller ended the series as the leading bowler, with 20 wickets at 19.90. He was second in the batting, with 362 runs at 40.22. Throughout the series, Miller and Lindwall were repeatedly successful with their concerted bouncer tactics, which were heavily criticised.

After the Test series ended, Miller captained a Commonwealth XI that played against a touring England team in Colombo, Ceylon. England had been on a tour of the Indian subcontinent. Miller scored 106 as the Commonwealth compiled 517. Miller took three wickets in the first innings and led his team to a victory by an innings and 259 runs.

=== Captain of New South Wales ===
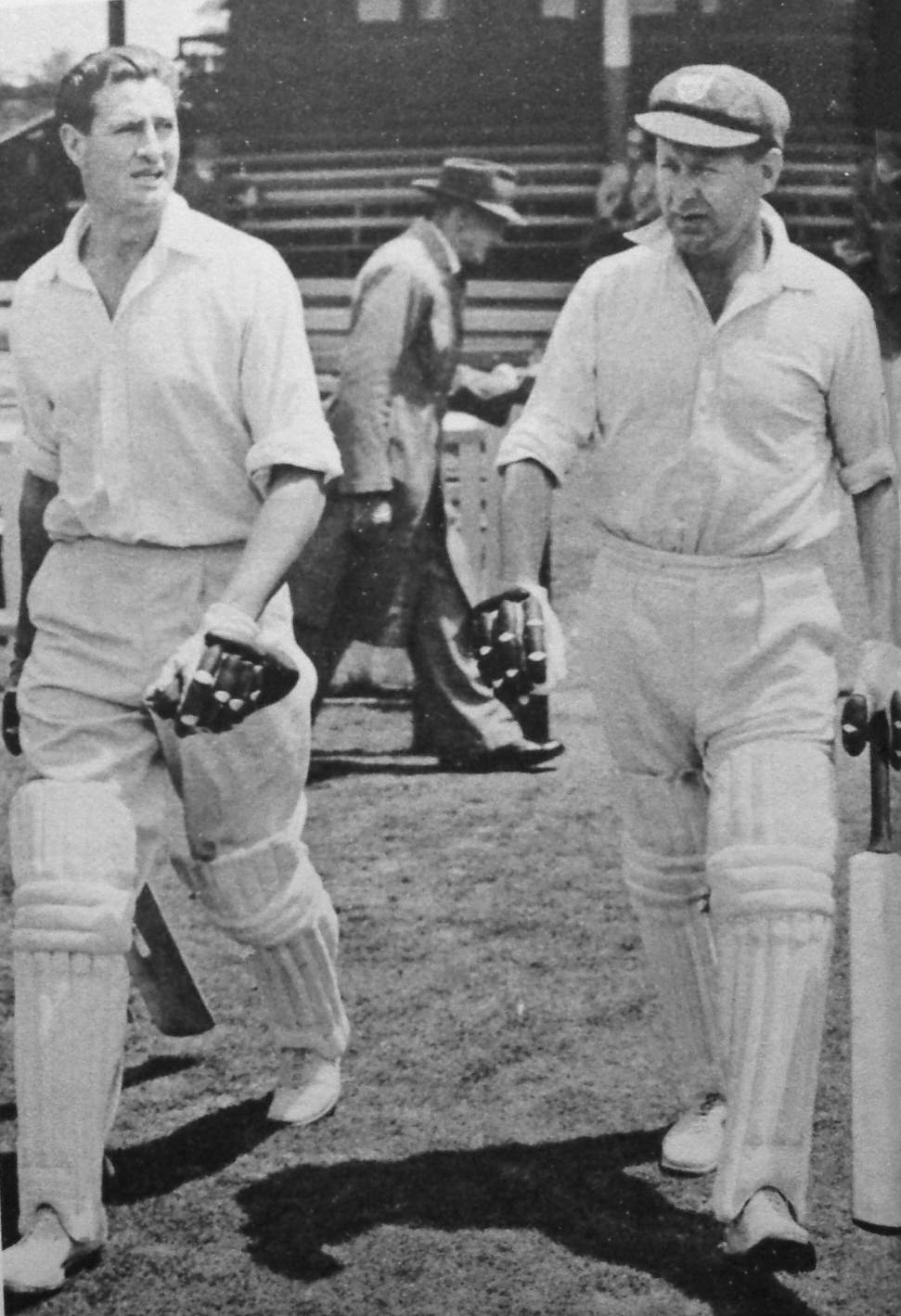
Miller and Morris walk out to bat for New South Wales.

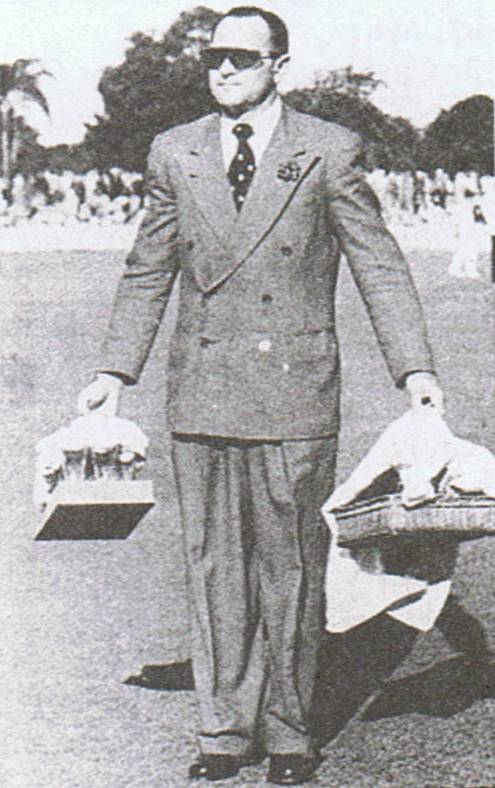
Sid Barnes, dressed in suit and tie and carrying a range of toiletry items. This incident was said to be held against Miller when the Australian Board of Control considered Hassett's replacement as Australian captain.

At the start of the 1952–53 season, the New South Wales Cricket Association's five-man selection panel installed Miller as captain in place of Morris. This was despite Morris leading the state to the Sheffield Shield in the previous season. Miller did not lobby for the job, but the Sydney media had campaigned for Miller, suggesting that his flamboyant style would attract more spectators and help stem the financial losses of the NSWCA. Despite this, Morris remained the Test vice-captain ahead of Miller.

In his first match as leader, Miller scored 109 against Queensland. Taking 260 minutes, it was the slowest century of his career. In another match against the touring South Africans, Miller elected to field and reduced his opponents to 3/3 and went on to win by five wickets. His players respected him, and some began to mimic his cough, voice, gait and idiosyncrasies. Richie Benaud unbuttoned his shirt in Miller's mould. He captained in an unorthodox manner, often trying unusual ploys to unsettle the opposition. He encouraged the opposition to attack in an attempt to get a wicket, and often shuffled his batting order to suit the circumstances of his batsmen. He was soon called before authorities after a match against South Australia. Sid Barnes, his 12th man, had come onto the ground with drinks, dressed as a flight attendant. He also brought things such as cigars, mirrors and combs. Barnes' antics extended the break longer than usual. Miller was called before the NSWCA after the South Australian Cricket Association lodged a complaint, and had to give an assurance that such an incident would not be repeated.

Miller started the Test series against South Africa poorly. Suffering from a throat infection, he scored three in both innings and took 1/46 in an Australian victory. In the Second Test at the MCG, Miller performed consistently with bat and ball, taking 4/62 and 3/51 and scoring 52 and 31. In the course of the match, he passed the all-round double of 1000 Test runs and 100 Test wickets when he dismissed John Waite in the second innings, but this was not enough to prevent defeat. In the Third Test, Miller scored 55, putting on 168 with Harvey, and took 3/48 and 2/33 in an innings victory. Australia's fortunes took a turn for the worse in the Fourth Test in Adelaide. Miller scored nine and injured his back after two overs with the ball. Lindwall also broke down. Without their spearheads, Australia were unable to bowl out the South Africans and match was drawn. Both were ruled out of the Fifth Test and the South Africans levelled the series despite conceding 520 runs during the first innings. Australia's bowlers were unable to stop the South African batsmen without their new ball pair.

=== 1953 Ashes tour ===
Australia proceeded to the 1953 Ashes tour. During a stopover at Naples, Miller was locked inside after entering a private opera rehearsal without authorisation, but managed to escape and rejoin the boat as it was about to leave. During his career, several cricket books were published under Miller's name, and he was embroiled in further controversy when one ghost-written tome, which was printed as the team left for England, criticised his captain Hassett as being too cautious.

The burden on Miller and Lindwall increased when Johnston broke down in an early tour game. Miller was wicketless against Worcestershire, but succeeded with the bat, scoring an unbeaten 220 in just over six hours. He then scored 159 not out against Yorkshire. At this point, Miller had scored 421 runs in the week of May, and the media began to speculate that he could score 1000 runs in one month, something that had been done on a tour only by Bradman.

Miller's love of horseracing then interfered with his quest. Wanting to attend an afternoon race meeting, he opened the batting in the morning against Cambridge University. Not intending to play a long innings, he attacked the bowling and was out for 20, before heading for the track. He stayed at the track until late afternoon, and returned to find the Australians walking out to field. This was followed by a match against the MCC at Lord's where he took four wickets of English Test players. Miller then took match figures of 5/27 against Oxford University. In the match against Essex, Miller pulled rib muscles, meaning he could not bowl in the First Test at Trent Bridge. He scored 55 and five in a rain-affected draw.

Australia travelled to Bramall Lane under the captaincy of Miller. Captain Hassett and his deputy Morris were rested and stayed in London with the team manager. After the first day's play, he organised a party for that lasted until the next afternoon—the rest day. He woke up with a hangover the next day just minutes before the start of play. Improvising, Miller arrived at the ground in a hearse. When it was Australia's turn to bat, Miller was the last man to be dismissed, having scored 86 despite his hangover.

The Test series moved to Lord's. Miller resumed bowling, sending down 42 overs and taking a total of 1/74. He managed 25 in the first innings, but promoted to number three in the second innings, he batted patiently to reach stumps before reaching his first Test century on English soil the following morning, but England held on for a draw. More than half of the Third Test at Old Trafford was washed out, resulting in another draw. Miller took 1/38 bowling fast off breaks and scored 17 and six. Australia then played Middlesex at Lord's, where Miller scored a hard-hitting 71.

Australia elected to field on a wet wicket in the Fourth Test at Headingley. Miller dismissed Edrich and Graveney and ended with 2/39 from 38 overs as England were bowled out for 167. Miller made only five in the first innings. In the second innings, Miller and Lindwall launched a short-pitched barrage and dismissed Watson and Simpson in consecutive balls. England were 5/177 a stumps on day four, leading by 78. The pacemen were booed from the field. The next day, Miller dismissed Evans early, before Trevor Bailey began his resistance. Frustrated by Bailey's defensive style and time-wasting, Miller lost his cool and aimed a beamer straight at Bailey's head, further angering the crowd. Miller ended with 4/63 from a long spell of 47 overs. England held on for another draw after more time-wasting by Bailey. The teams headed for the Fifth Test at The Oval tied 0–0. Miller's last Test performance was his least productive; he scored one and a duck and took a total of 2/89. England won the match and regained the Ashes. Miller's returns were below his career standards, with 223 runs at 24.77 and 10 wickets at 30.30. He took two catches.

Miller scored 67 against the Gentlemen of England at Lord's and then played against the Combined Services at Kingston. He reached his century before lunch and then proceeded to 262 not out with 24 boundaries. This included a 377-run fourth-wicket stand by Jim de Courcy in only 205 minutes, in particular targeting Fred Trueman's bowling. He then took 3/17 with the ball. He finished the English summer with 1,433 runs at 51.17, the second highest average behind Harvey among batsmen with over 200 runs. He was the only Australian to hit two double centuries and also took 45 wickets at 22.51. For his efforts that summer, Wisden Cricketers' Almanack named him one of its Five Cricketers of the Year.

=== Overlooked for Test captaincy ===
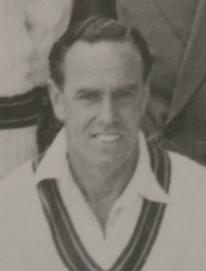
Ian Johnson, Miller's rival for the position of Test captain

Miller returned to Australia and led New South Wales to the Sheffield Shield title in 1953–54. He topped the Australian first-class batting averages with 71.10, but had his poorest season with the ball, taking only 16 wickets at 38.75. The season was purely domestic with no touring side and therefore no Test matches. The season was also a transition point in Australian cricket, as Hassett retired upon return to Australia. Initially, Morris and Miller were the two frontrunners for the captaincy. Miller was the state captain, but Morris was the vice-captain of the Test team ahead of Miller. At the time, Johnson had been dropped from the Australian team, but inherited the Victorian captaincy from Hassett, who accused him of not trying. Hassett told Johnson that he could become Test captain if he regained his form and his Test position. As the outgoing captain, Hassett was believed to have an influence over the selection of his successor. Miller had also criticised Hassett in his book, and there was talk that Hassett was upset about Miller's departure from South Melbourne and Victoria. Johnson returned to form with 45 wickets at 22.75 for the season.

England toured Australia in the 1954–55 season. Johnson was selected to lead an Australian XI in a tour match against the Englishmen before the Tests, an indication of the selectors' inclination. He took 6/66 in England's only innings. The build-up featured a media war, Melbourne newspapers stumping for Johnson and the Sydney journalists trumpeting Miller. Miller warmed up for the Tests with 86 for New South Wales against England. On 18 November, the Australian Board of Control selected Johnson as captain, with Morris as his deputy. Miller's irreverent nature was cited as a possible reason for the board's selection. Johnson was regarded as a superior diplomat; Miller had a reputation for turning up late and being undisciplined. Miller had frequently been in dispute with Bradman, who was a member of the board and the chairman of selectors. Miller had also questioned where revenue that the board collected from ticket sales was being used. Others claimed that Johnson was appointed because he was part of the establishment; his father Bill was a former Australian selector. The decision was bitterly criticised by the Sydney press.

There is strong feeling amongst cricket enthusiasts that horse trading on a state basis rather than objective evaluation of cricket skills has dominated selectors discussions. The operating principle seems to have been "you look after my man and we'll look after yours."

— The Daily Telegraph editorial,

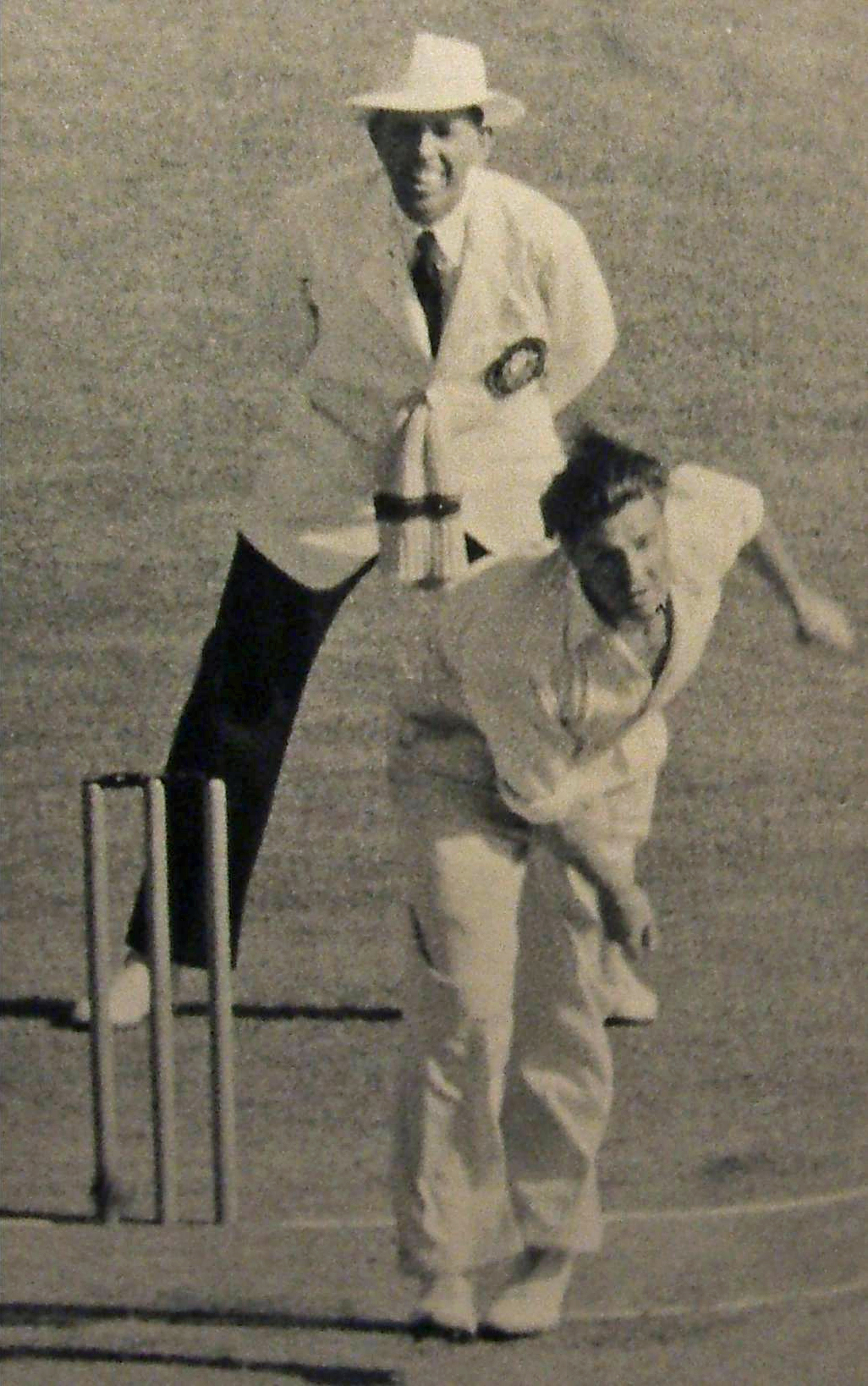
Miller bowling in the Third Test

Miller scored 49 in the First Test at Brisbane as Australia amassed 8/601, before dismissing Simpson and Hutton as England fell to an innings defeat. A knee injury forced Miller to miss the Second Test at the SCG, which England won. Miller returned for the Third Test at the MCG, but was initially unavailable to bowl due to lingering knee problems. Upon receiving an inquiry about the health of his knee before the match by Prime Minister of Australia Robert Menzies, Miller agreed to try to bowl for a short period and lift his team. England elected to bat and Miller removed Hutton, Edrich and Compton with his outswinger. He ended up bowling for the entire first session of play and had 3/5 at lunch from nine overs, before finishing at 3/14. England were bowled out for 191. Miller struggled with the bat, scoring six and seven as Frank Tyson's pace saw England inflict a second successive defeat on Australia. Australia needed to win the Fourth Test in Adelaide to keep the series alive. Miller scored 44 and 14 as Australia were bowled out in the second innings to leave England with 94 for victory. Miller made a late burst, removing Edrich, Hutton and Colin Cowdrey in consecutive overs to leave England at 3/18. He then took a difficult catch from Johnston to dismiss Peter May. England were then 4/49 but hung on to win by five wickets and secure the Ashes. It was the first time that Australia had lost three consecutive Tests since the Bodyline series of 1932–33. Miller made 19 and 28 in the rain-affected draw in the Fifth Test. He ended the series with 167 runs at 23.86, his lowest ever at international level, and took 10 wickets at 24.30.

He had more success as domestic level. New South Wales beat Victoria in two days at the SCG to win the Sheffield Shield; Miller taking five wickets in the second innings. He also led his state in a 45-run win over the tourists, their only defeat apart from the First Test. The match was marked by a quickfire 71 in 57 minutes and his team's attacking strategy.

=== West Indies tour ===
After leading his state to another Sheffield Shield title and a win over England, Miller replaced Morris as the vice-captain for the tour of the West Indies that started in early 1955. Australia was looking for its first series win against any team in three years, having lost two consecutive series to England. Australia batted first in the opening Test at Sabina Park in Jamaica. Miller came to the wicket at 2/137 and put on a 224-run partnership with Harvey. Both ended with centuries and Miller scored his highest Test score of 147, striking 15 fours. When Valentine and Ramadhin had conceded 100 runs, he respectively shook their hands. Australia finished at 9/515. Johnson had been injured when hit in the foot by a yorker so Miller was left in charge of the team on the field with Australia one bowler short. Miller attempted to unsettle the batsmen by placing many men close to the bat in an attempt to insult their batting capabilities. He took the new ball at 5/239 and the hosts collapsed to be all out for 259. Miller had taken 2/36, and enforced the follow-on, which was questioned as paceman Ron Archer had broken down. With Australia two bowlers short, the West Indies moved to 1/114. When Weekes arrived at the crease, Miller unsettled him with delaying tactics, and he was out for one. He then placed two silly points and two silly mid-ons in an attempt to unsettle Walcott, who fell to Lindwall soon after. Miller then took two wickets and the hosts had lost three wickets in as many overs. The West Indies were bowled out and Australia won by nine wickets. Miller had taken 3/62 in the second innings.

Johnson resumed the leadership on the field in the Second Test at Queen's Park Oval in Trinidad. The match was a high-scoring draw, but Miller scored only three and took match figures of 1/148. In the Third Test at Georgetown, Guyana, Miller removed both openers in the first innings and then scored 33 as Australia by eight wickets. He took 3/51 for the match. In the Fourth Test at Bridgetown, Barbados, Miller came to the wicket with Australia at 3/226 on the first day. The tourists lost two more wickets to be 5/233. Miller and Archer launched a counter-attacking partnership of 206. Miller reached 137 and then walked after edging a ball, even though none of the opposition had appealed. Australia reached 668 and the West Indies were struggling at 6/147, Miller having dismissed Weekes and Collie Smith in the same over. At the time, Miller was bowling at medium pace, but Johnson felt that the new batsmen Denis Atkinson and Clairmonte Depeiaza were vulnerable to express pace. Johnson ordered Miller to bowl fast, but was turned down. Johnson replaced Miller with Lindwall, who was tired and was hit around the ground. The pair seized the initiative and compiled a world Test record of 347 for the seventh wicket and the Australians were tired after failing to break the partnership. Miller attacked Johnson in front of the other players, saying "You couldn't captain a bunch of bloody schoolboys!" Johnson then offered to resolve the dispute "out the back", implying a fisticuffs.

Miller declined the offer and stopped. The match resumed the next day and the West Indies were eventually bowled out 158 behind. Miller had been punished by the batsmen, taking 2/113 from 22 overs. Miller scored 10 and took 1/66 in the second innings as the match ended in a high-scoring draw. Miller then took 6/107 in the first innings of the Fifth Test in Jamaica. He removed John Holt, Walcott and Smith, before taking three tail-end wickets as the home team were bowled out for 357. When Australia batted, Miller arrived at the crease to join Harvey with the score at 3/302. He added his third century of the series and ended with 109 as Australia reached 8/758. He took 2/58 in the second innings as Australia completed a 3–0 win. It was Miller's most statistically successful series, with 439 runs at 73.17 and the 20 wickets at 32.05 made him the equal leading wicket-taker along with Lindwall.

=== Final domestic season ===
Miller started the 1955–56 season, which was purely domestic, with 164 against Queensland in Brisbane. On the final day, Miller set the hosts 275 for victory in three hours. He convinced officials to pause the match for the running of the Melbourne Cup. Queensland lost seven wickets but held on for a draw, aided by the 20 minutes lost by Miller's love of horseracing.

The next match was against South Australia in Sydney. New South Wales had declared at 8/215 and the visitors were 0/2 at stumps on the first day. Miller's wife gave birth to their fourth child, and Miller was drinking into the next morning. He then arrived at the SCG, having forgotten to pick up teammate Peter Philpott as arranged, so he had to rush back and the pair arrived late for the day's play. Miller was still in a tuxedo as play was about to start. Miller completed the unfinished over from the previous night and felt that the pitch did not offer any assistance. He then told Alan Davidson to bowl the next over from his end but, as Davidson was about to bowl, Miller changed his mind and took over. Miller bowled Les Favell in the over. He kept on bowling and finished with 7/12 from 7.3 overs, clean bowling five of his victims. The visitors had been levelled for 27, the lowest score in the history of the Sheffield Shield. Miller then asked South Australia to follow-on, but showed little interest in bowling again, delivering only six overs despite the bowler-friendly conditions. Philpott said that "this was typical Miller. He was never an accumulator of records, not particularly concerned with figures." In another incident, Miller had been making a speech at a civic reception for the New South Wales team in the town of Maitland. In front of the mayor at the town hall, he praised the hospitality, before turning around to his players and asking what the name of the town was. Miller then turned up late to a coaching clinic the next day and instead of teaching, he made a speech, advising the children to play tennis as there was more money on offer.

In January 1956, Miller injured his back in a match against Queensland. He suffered spasms that forced him to miss the rest of the season. He had scored 403 runs at 80.60 and taken 19 wickets at 14.94. New South Wales again won the Sheffield Shield.

=== Final Ashes tour ===
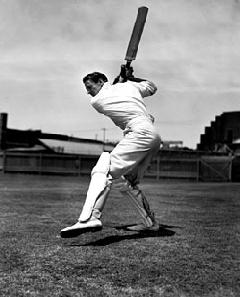
Miller preparing to play a drive

Miller was selected for the 1956 Ashes tour, but could not bowl for a month because of a back injury from the first match. Miller captained the Australians against Leicester. Coming in at 3/175, Miller made his highest first-class score of 281 not out, striking 35 fours in six and a half hours. A tougher fight awaited against Surrey at The Oval, who had England's Test spin combination of Laker and Tony Lock. Miller came in at 3/124 and struggled, scoring 18 runs in his first 120 minutes, his slowest two hours of scoring in his career. As his partners continued to fall Miller ended unbeaten on 57 as Australia were bowled out for 259; Laker taking all ten wickets. Australia lost by ten wickets, its first loss to a county since 1912. As a result, sections of the Australian media began campaigning for Miller to replace Johnson as captain.

By the First Test at Trent Bridge, Miller was shouldering most of the bowling load. He sent down 52 overs in a rain-affected match, taking match figures of 6/127. He struggled with the bat, making a duck and four. The teams headed to Lord's where Miller had to carry the pace attack without the injured Davidson and Lindwall. Crawford and Ken Mackay were called in to make their debut and support Miller with the pace duties. Australia batted first and Miller managed 28. Australia managed only 285 and Crawford injured himself, exacerbating the burden on Miller. Miller had Peter Richardson and then bowled Tom Graveney with an outswinger. England were 2/32 and their captain Peter May received an inswinger from Miller first ball, which he inside edged onto his stumps, but the bail was not dislodged. The next day, Miller beat May four times and then had Watson caught in the gully in his third over. He then removed Bailey and Trueman. Miller's 5/72 was largely responsible for England falling for 171. Australia was in difficulty at 3/69 when Miller came to bat, hitting a counterattacking 30. Australia set England 371 to win. Miller removed Graveney at the start of the run chase. Resuming the next morning, he bowled Watson, and had May and Evans both caught behind. He bowled Johnny Wardle and took his only ten-wicket match haul in Tests. Australia won by 185 runs and Miller had bowled 70.1 overs for the match. His knee had taken a heavy toll and Miller was given an extended break had to play purely as a batsman in the Third Test at Headingley. Australia were caught on a wet wicket in response to England's 325, and Miller top-scored with 41 and Australia were forced to follow on. He had attempted to keep Laker and Lock at bay with his pads. In the second innings, Miller fell for 26 to Laker. Australia lost by an innings, for the first time in a Test in 18 years.

The Australian press attacked the team, and called for changes, including the omission of the captain, Johnson. Johnson, Miller and Gil Langley were the tour selectors. Langley and Miller were willing to omit Johnson only if the captain volunteered to stand aside. Johnson did not volunteer, so the others did not discuss the topic. Miller and Johnson had both been appointed as Members of the Order of the British Empire (MBE) in the 1956 New Year Honours, and between the Tests they attended their formal investiture.

The curator at Old Trafford had been ordered to prepare a dusty, spinning pitch for the Fourth Test. A win for England would see them retain the Ashes. Miller bowled 21 wicketless overs as England amassed 459. Miller was out for six and a duck and fell twice to Laker, who took a world record 19 wickets as Australia lost by an innings. Wisden reported that the Australians were said "to be extremely bitter over the condition of the pitch".

Miller then took 5/84 against Surrey, before leading the team against Warwickshire. He had received death threats in the lead-up to the game, ordering him to lose. He scored 46 not out and took 2/13 as Australia won by an innings. He then took 5/29 in the second innings against Lancashire and made 50 and took match figures of 5/78 against Essex.

On the eve of the Fifth Test at The Oval, Miller announced that the tour would be his last, so that he would retire from cricket after the tour of the Indian subcontinent on the return voyage. In his final Test on English soil, he took 4/91 in the first innings. Miller came in to bat at 5/47 and helped Australia recover to 202, top-scoring with 61. He took another one wicket in the second innings and was unbeaten on seven when stumps were drawn in the second innings. The series ended 1–2. He ended the series with 203 runs at 22.55 and topped the bowling with 21 wickets at 22.23. He topped the first-class bowling for the Australians with 50 wickets at 19.60.

Australia played Pakistan at Karachi in the first Test between the two countries on a matting pitch, rather than the more familiar grass pitch. Miller top-scored in the first innings with 21, as Australia fell for 80. He took 2/40 and then scored 11 in the second innings as Australia fell to defeat. It was the last Test of his career, as his knee injury deteriorated to the point that he could not play in the three Tests against India, and retired upon his return to Australia.

== Style and personality ==
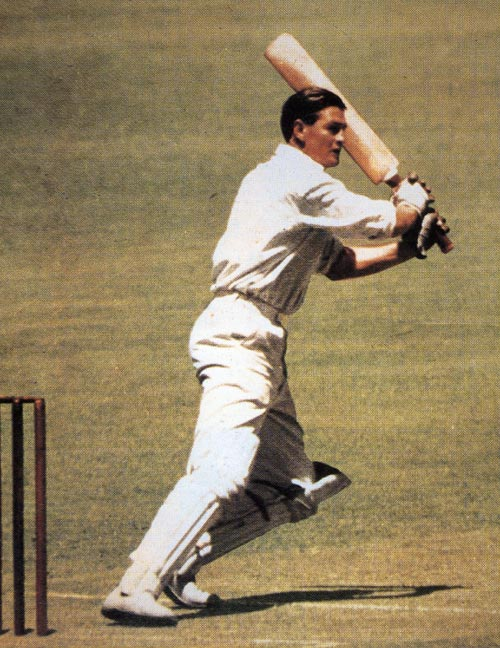
Miller playing a cut shot

Miller combined classy strokeplay with big hitting, his front foot play especially devastating. He had a rifle like straight drive, played pull and sweep shots with a minimum of effort and was able to cut elegantly. He combined this elegance with unorthodoxy, hitting two sixes over square leg with a backhand tennis shot and once beginning the day's play in a Test match with a six. One straight six that he hit at the Sydney Cricket Ground was still rising when it hit the first deck of the M.A. Noble Stand. Len Hutton said he was "the most unpredictable cricketer I have played against".

As a bowler, Miller had a classically high arm action, moving the ball sharply either way and able to make the ball rise from a good length. His action caused opposition batsmen to perceive that his deliveries were gaining pace after pitching. He was often able to generate more pace than his new ball partner, Lindwall. He was always willing to try something new if the batsman were set, varying his approach from fifteen paces to five and vice versa. A round arm delivery often managed to capture a wicket, surprising the batsman. Compton said that Miller "often had no preconceived idea what he intended to bowl even as he turned to start his run". Miller often mixed slow leg breaks when he was bowling off a run. He once bowled English opening batsman David Sheppard with a googly during a Test. Hutton opined that Miller was the bowler who was least concerned with the position of his bowling mark, and said that he "never felt physically safe against him". His use of bouncers at Trent Bridge during the 1948 tour was seen as excessive by the English crowd, who booed him. Miller simply sat down until the barracking had subsided. He was often required to bowl through pain, pressing a disk into place at the base of his spine before sending down the next delivery.

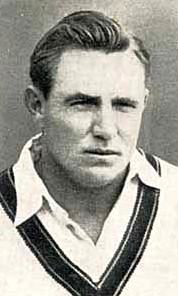
Ray Lindwall, Miller's good friend and bowling partner

Miller and Lindwall formed an opening partnership that was regarded as one of the greatest of all time. Hutton said that the pair was the most hostile that he faced during his career. Alan Davidson, a bowling all rounder who supported Lindwall and Miller for New South Wales and Australia, said that "Ray Lindwall was the best bowler I ever saw of any type; his control was just perfect. At the other end you had Miller, who was unpredictable...It really was a perfect team." He was an acrobatic slips fielder, who would take freakish catches with nonchalant ease, often immediately returning to his discussion with those around him as if nothing was unusual.

Miller often required a contest to retain interest in the game. He deplored Bradman's ruthless attitude towards annihilating the opposition and sometimes refused to try when Australia was in an unassailable position. At Southend in 1948, as the Australians scored a world record 721 runs in a single day against Essex, Miller, coming in to bat when the score was 2/364, allowed himself to be bowled first ball. Indeed, he "turned to the wicketkeeper and said: 'Thank God that's over.'" His teammate Sid Barnes said that if Miller "had the same outlook as Bradman or Ponsford he would have made colossal scores" and become "the statisticians' greatest customer".

Miller never captained Australia in a Test, as his attitude to the game tended to alarm the authorities. About Miller, Ashley Mallett wrote, "He loved tradition, but hated convention. His unstructured way of playing and living would be anathema to cricketers now... He played as he fought the war, by impulse and mood." He sometimes set his field by saying to his players: "scatter". On another occasion, he is reported turned to his players, after being told that NSW was taking the field with one player too many, and asked for one player to volunteer to "piss off".

A larger than life character, Miller is the subject of many stories, often apocryphal. One story had Don Bradman answering a knock on the door late one night to see Miller dressed in a dinner suit. Miller advised Bradman that, as demanded, he was in bed at curfew and was now going out. His relationship with Bradman was one riddled with friction and mutual antipathy, "one a roundhead of massive influence, the other a cavalier and maverick". As Bradman moved from batting hero and team captain to selector and administrator, his influence grew; this "... almost certainly cost Miller any chance of captaining his country".

One night, following a duel with Messerschmitts in his Mosquito, he made an unauthorised detour over Bonn because it was Beethoven's birthplace and he was a lover of the classics. Despite his fame, Miller remained a humble man; when asked his favourite cricketing memory, he would recall no incident concerning himself, but "a South Australian team-mate walking onto Lord's to a thunderous ovation a few weeks after his release from a POW camp". The cricket broadcaster, John Arlott said "that for all the glamour that attached to Miller, he was staunch and unaffected as a friend".

== Later life ==
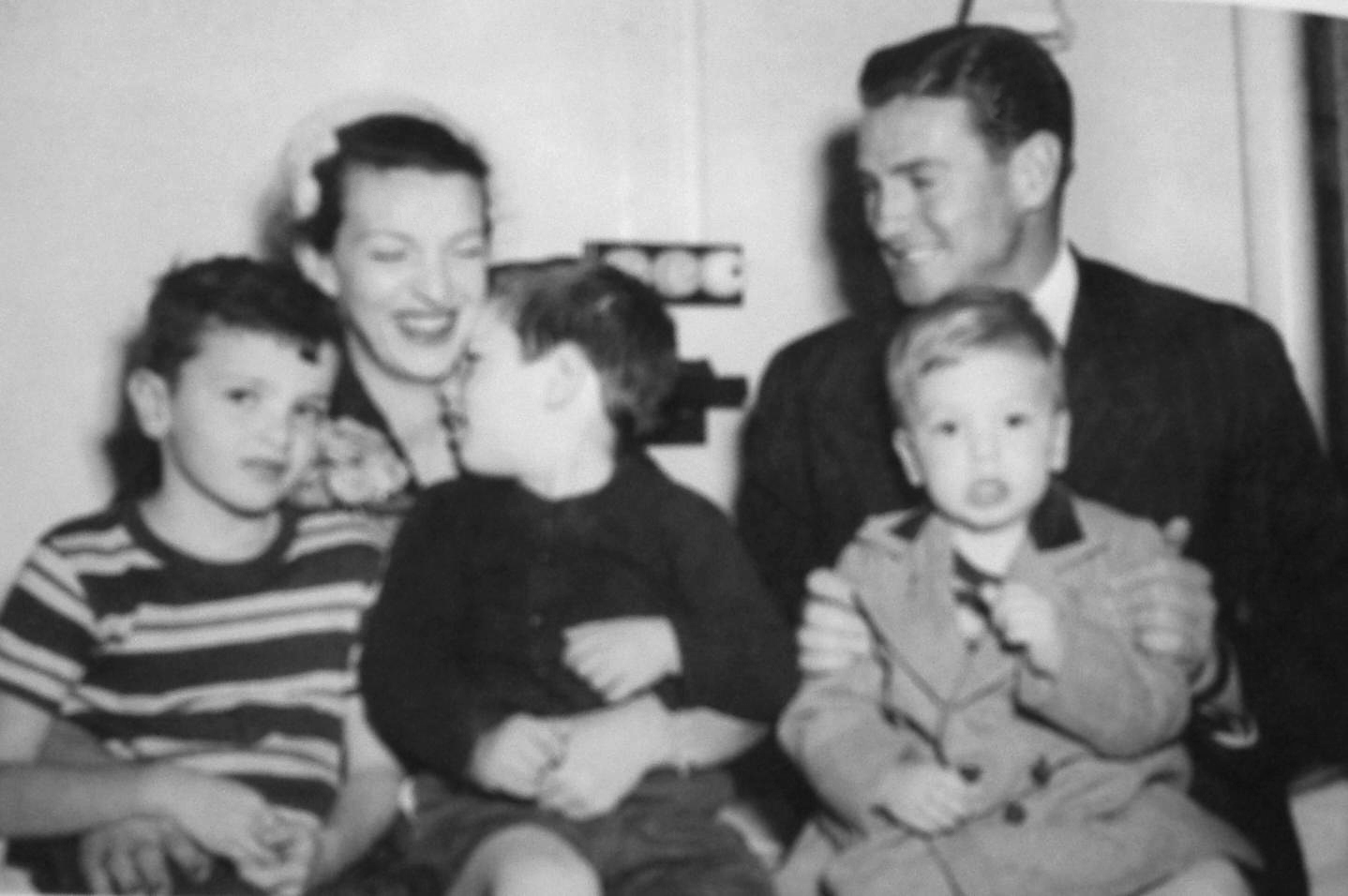
Miller and his first wife and sons, pictured in the 1950s

After retirement, Miller remained in the public eye, augmented by persistent "unsubstantiated rumours of an affair with Princess Margaret". He made a living as a journalist and columnist, employed by the Daily Express as a "special cricket writer" for twenty years. As during his career, Miller was a proponent of attacking and bright play. He praised the aggressive leadership of Richie Benaud but criticised the style of play pursued by Australia under Benaud's successors Bob Simpson and Bill Lawry. In the mid-1980s, when Australia was struggling, Miller called for the removal of Allan Border, an obdurate and defensive batsman, from the captaincy.

He later worked for Vernons Pools, owned by the millionaire horseracing entrepreneur, Robert Sangster. Miller "was happiest at the cricket or at the races". He also worked as the head of a lobby group in promoting Australian rules football in his adopted New South Wales in the 1980s. At the time, the VFL was the dominant league and there were no top-flight teams in his adopted state or Queensland.

Miller's later life was plagued by ill health. In November 1991, he was hospitalised with a stroke, and soon after fell over and broke his hip, necessitating two further operations. He had skin cancer, caused by his insistence on always displaying his mop of hair and not wearing a hat. He accepted these vicissitudes equably. "Some grieved to see him reduced, but not him; these were life's deliveries. He knew only that one would get him out eventually." He had an earlobe removed. The cancer also attacked his legs, and coupled with his hip injury, severely curtailed his mobility, forcing him to use walking frames and wheelchairs. Asked at 75 about death, he said: "Never think about it. No regrets. I've had a hell of a good life. Been damned lucky."

Despite his illnesses, he continued to travel to England in the 1990s to watch cricket and meet up with Compton, Edrich and other war and cricket colleagues on an annual basis, although he became increasingly isolated as he outlasted his friends, both English and Australian. On 1 January 2001, Miller was awarded the Centenary Medal for "service to Australian society through the sport of cricket".

In late 2002, Miller divorced his wife Peg, with whom he had four sons. He did so to marry his long-term mistress Marie Challman, with whom he had been living since 1999. Challman was a hospital receptionist and Miller reasoned that he would receive more effective medical treatment by moving to Melbourne to live with her, as his specialist doctors also lived there. He had other long-term mistresses, including an Australian beauty queen with whom he was photographed in public. During his later years, his illness contributed to what his family felt was a deteriorating attitude and he fell out with his sons, but they were reconciled shortly before his death.

Miller died on 11 October 2004 after being in persistent poor health. The Victoria Government gave him a state funeral that saw hundreds of mourners stand outside the packed cathedral, and was broadcast across the nation on ABC Radio. He was posthumously appointed a Member of the Order of Australia in the 2005 Australia Day Honours for "service to sport, particularly cricket as a player, journalist and commentator".

== Legacy and statistical analysis ==
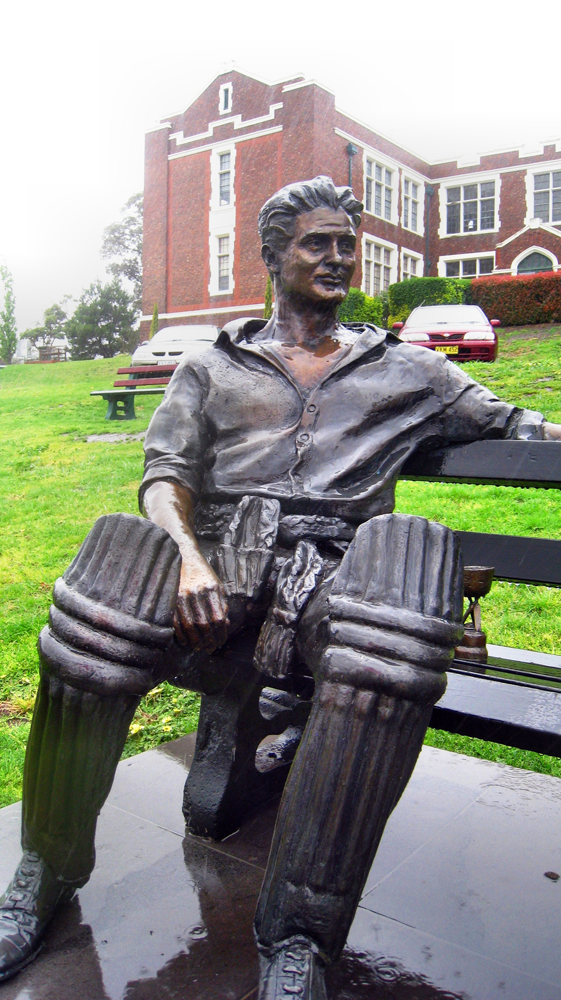
Life-size bronze statue of Miller outside Melbourne High School, sculpted by Linda Klarfeld

Miller's achievements were recognised by a host of awards during his lifetime and posthumously. Miller was one of the ten inaugural inductees into the Australian Cricket Hall of Fame in 1996. In 2000, he was named in the Australian Cricket Board Team of the Century as its vice-captain. In January 2009, Miller was announced as one of the inaugural inductees in the ICC Cricket Hall of Fame, having previously been included in the Federation of International Cricketers' Associations (FICA) Hall of Fame. ESPN writer Steven Lynch wrote that Miller "was more than a cricketer ... he embodied the idea that there was more to life than cricket".

He is also one of only four Australian cricketers to be honoured with a portrait in the Long Room at Lord's in London. (Note: The following sources are, respectively, a Miller obituary from 2004, which lists Trumper and Bradman and a further piece from 2005, when Warne's portrait was added. Mike Atherton, the author of the second piece, curiously overlooks Trumper's portrait; other articles of the same period do similarly.) Miller is one of only three men to have his name on both the batting and bowling honours boards in the visitors' dressing-room there, for scoring both a century and for taking five wickets in a test at the ground.

Miller's abilities as an all-rounder led to enormous success as both batsman and bowler. The ICC player rankings have been applied retrospectively to cricket history and Miller achieved top ten rankings with both bat and ball. As a batsman, he peaked at ninth in the world in 1952, and was a top-20 player from shortly after his début and for the rest of the duration of his career. Miller's bowling abilities led to even greater success. By the end of 1946, he was already ranked sixth in the world and thereafter never slipped lower than ninth; for much of his career, he was the second-best bowler in the world according to the ratings, remarkably, for a 36-year-old, peaking at the number 1 slot for a few months in 1956. As an all-rounder, therefore, it is unsurprising to find that he was peerless for most of his career, ranked as number one in the world for most of his career, including an unbroken eight-year run from June 1948 until his retirement.

Miller's statistics are an inexact measure of his worth to the side. Many of the Australia teams he played in featured very strong batting line-ups, restricting his opportunities as a middle-order player. His verve and enthusiasm were also important contributors to Australian success, as was his ability to produce the unexpected (particularly with the ball) and help break partnerships. It is for this reason that he is remembered for his personality and his one-off feats, more than statistical accomplishment; in Ian Chappell's words "People who saw it still talk of Keith Miller's monster shot that hit the Members Stand clock at the SCG in the 1950s".

=== Test match performance ===
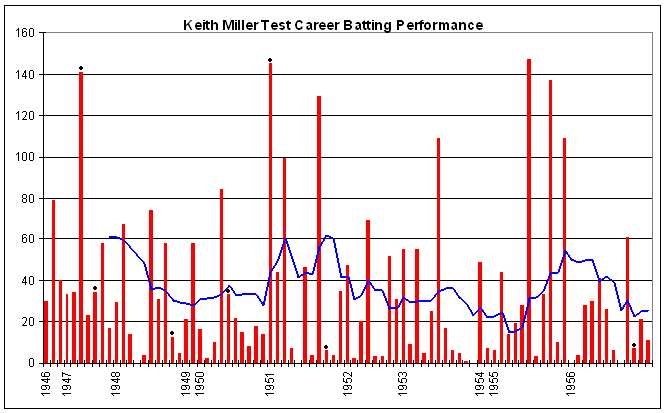
An innings-by-innings breakdown of Miller's Test match batting career, showing runs scored (red bars) and the average of the last ten innings (blue line). The blue dots indicate an innings where he was not dismissed.

		Batting				Bowling			
Opposition	Matches	Runs	Average	High Score	100 / 50	Runs	Wickets	Average	Best (Inns)
England	29	1,511	33.57	145*	3/6	1,949	87	22.40	7/60
India	5	185	37.00	67	0/2	223	9	24.77	2/25
New Zealand	1	30	30.00	30	0/0	6	2	3.00	2/6
Pakistan	1	32	16.00	21	0/0	58	2	29.00	2/40
South Africa	9	399	33.25	84	0/4	631	30	21.03	5/40
West Indies	10	801	53.40	147	4/1	1,039	40	25.97	6/107
Overall	55	2,958	36.97	147	7/13	3,906	170	22.97	7/60

== Bibliography ==
- Armstrong, Geoff (2002). ESPN's legends of cricket: profiles of the game's greatest. Sydney: Allen & Unwin. ISBN 1-86508-836-6.
- Bradman, Donald (1994). Farewell to cricket. Editions Tom Thomson. ISBN 1-875892-01-X.
- Brett, Oliver (11 October 2004). "Australia's greatest all-rounder". BBC.
- Coleman, Robert (1993). Seasons In the Sun: the Story Of the Victorian Cricket Association. Melbourne: Hargreen Publishing. ISBN 0-949905-59-3.
- Coverdale, Brydon (28 May 2007). "Australia's winter allrounders". ESPNcricinfo.
- Fingleton, Jack (1949). Brightly fades the Don. Collins. OCLC 2943894.
- Haigh, Gideon (1997). The Summer Game: Australian Test Cricket 1949–71. Text Publishing. ISBN 1-875847-44-8.
- Haigh, Gideon (2006). The summer game: Cricket in Australia in the 50s and 60s. Sydney: Australian Broadcasting Corporation. ISBN 978-0-7333-2003-3.
- Harte, Chris; Whimpress, Bernard (2003). The Penguin History of Australian Cricket. André Deutsch. ISBN 0-670-04133-5.
- Main, Jim; Holmesby, Russell (1992). The encyclopedia of league footballers. Melbourne: Wilkinson. ISBN 1-86337-085-4.
- Mallett, Ashley (2001). Eleven: The Greatest Eleven of the 20th Century. University of Queensland Press. ISBN 0-7022-3258-0.
- Miller, Keith (1956). Cricket Crossfire. London: Oldbourne Press.
- Perry, Roland (2006). Miller's Luck: the life and loves of Keith Miller, Australia's greatest all-rounder. Sydney: Random House. ISBN 978-1-74166-222-1.
- Robinson, Ray; Haigh, Gideon (1996). On top down under: Australia's cricket captains (revised ed.). Adelaide: Wakefield. ISBN 1-86254-387-9.
- Pollard, Jack (1988). Australian Cricket: The Game and the Players. Sydney: Angus & Robertson. ISBN 0-207-15269-1.
- Pollard, Jack (1988). The Bradman Years: Australian Cricket 1918–48. HarperCollins. ISBN 0-207-15596-8.
- Pollard, Jack (1990). From Bradman to Border: Australian Cricket 1948–89. HarperCollins. ISBN 0-207-16124-0.
- Smith, Rick (1999). Cricket's Enigma: The Sid Barnes Story. Sydney: Australian Broadcasting Corporation. ISBN 0-7333-0787-6.
- Whitington, Richard (1981). Keith Miller: the golden nugget. Rigby Publishers. ISBN 0-7270-1424-2.
