= Australian cricket team in England in 1953 =

International cricket tour

The Australian cricket team toured England in the 1953 season to play a five-match Test series against England for The Ashes.

England won the final Test to take the series 1–0 after the first four Tests were all drawn. England therefore recovered the Ashes for the first time since losing them in 1934.

== Australian cricket team ==
The Australian side was captained by Lindsay Hassett, with Arthur Morris as vice-captain. The full side was:

- Lindsay Hassett, captain
- Arthur Morris, vice-captain
- Ron Archer
- Richie Benaud
- Ian Craig
- Alan Davidson
- Jim de Courcy
- Neil Harvey
- Jack Hill
- Graeme Hole
- Bill Johnston
- Gil Langley, wicketkeeper
- Ray Lindwall
- Colin McDonald
- Keith Miller
- Doug Ring
- Don Tallon, wicketkeeper

Hassett, Morris, Harvey, Johnston, Lindwall, Miller, Ring and Tallon had toured England with the 1948 Australian team, known as The Invincibles. Davidson, de Courcy and Hill had not played Test cricket before this tour: all three made their debuts during the 1953 Ashes series.

== Test series summary ==
=== First Test at Trent Bridge, 11–16 June ===
Australia (249 and 123) drew with England (144 and 120 for one wicket).

Rain washed out play entirely on the fourth day and prevented a resumption until half past four on the last day. Before that, Alec Bedser, with seven wickets in each innings, had bowled England into a strong position after they trailed by 105 on the first innings. In Australia's first innings, Morris, who made 67 and Hassett put on 122 for the second wicket and then Hassett and Miller made 109 for the fourth wicket, Miller making 55. Hassett's 115 was his ninth century in Test cricket. From 243 for four at lunch on the second day, Australia lost their remaining six wickets for six runs, Bedser finishing with seven for 55. England, apart from Leonard Hutton, with 43, struggled and Lindwall took five wickets for 57 runs. In Australia's second innings, only Morris, who made 60, was confident against Bedser, who took seven for 44 to have match figures of 14 for 99. Hutton was 60 not out in England's weather-interrupted reply.

=== Second Test at Lord's, 25–30 June ===
Australia (346 and 368) drew with England (372 and 282 for seven wickets).

Hassett opened with Morris and made his second century of the series, though he retired hurt at 101. Harvey made 59, but Johnny Wardle removed the middle order batsmen before Davidson, with 76, coaxed 117 runs out of the last six wickets. Hutton and Tom Graveney put on 168 for the second wicket, and after Graveney was out for 78, Denis Compton (57) added a further 102 with Hutton, who scored 145. But England lost their last seven wickets between lunch and tea on the third day, and the first innings lead was only 26. Morris and Miller regained the initiative for Australia in a second wicket partnership of 165 and when Morris was out for 89 Miller went on to 109, with useful runs also from Hole (47) and Lindwall (50). Set 343 to win, England lost three wickets for 12 runs, and Willie Watson was missed before the end of the fourth day. On the last day, Watson battled to 109 and shared a fifth wicket stand of 163 with Trevor Bailey (71), which saved the match for England.

=== Third Test at Old Trafford, 9–14 July ===
Australia (318 and 35 for eight wickets) drew with England (276).

More than half the scheduled playing time was lost to rain. In an innings spread over three days, Harvey made 122 and Hole with 66 and de Courcy on his Test debut also made useful runs. England's innings was also made disjointed by rain, which prevented any play at all on the fourth day. Hutton top-scored with 66. With the match dead, Wardle, Bedser and Jim Laker took eight Australian second-innings wickets, with none of the batsmen reaching double figures.

=== Fourth Test at Headingley, 23–28 July ===
England (167 and 275) drew with Australia (266 and 147 for four wickets).

On a pitch affected by damp, England batted very cautiously, making just 142 for seven in five-and-a-half hours on the first day, Graveney top-scoring with 55. Lindwall took five for 54. Australia batted more enterprisingly, with Harvey making 71 and Hole 53 and were all out at the end of the second day with a lead of 99. Light rain prevented play for more than four hours on the third day, and across the Monday England batted doggedly, with Bill Edrich making 64, Compton 61 until he had to retire hurt, and Bailey 38 in more than four hours. In all, England's innings occupied nine hours and 40 minutes, and left the Australians 115 minutes in which to score 177. Despite 30s from Morris, Harvey and Hole, they finished 30 runs short.

=== Fifth Test at The Oval, 15–19 August ===
Australia (275 and 162) lost to England (306 and 132 for two wickets) by eight wickets.

The series being undecided, six days were allowed and the match began, unusually for a Test in England, on a Saturday. Hassett won the toss for the fifth time. He made 53 and Harvey and Hole made 30s, but Lindwall top-scored with 62 and last five wickets more than doubled the score. Fred Trueman, in his only match of the series, took four wickets. Hutton scored 82, but at the end of the second day England, at 235 for seven, were still 40 behind. The lead was not gained until the last pair, Bailey and Bedser, were together; Bailey made 64. When Australia batted for the second time, Hutton turned very quickly to the Surrey spin-bowling pair, Laker and Tony Lock, and they took nine of the 10 wickets to fall, the other being a run-out. Lock finished with five for 45 and Laker four for 75. Australia's lack of a spinner – though Johnston bowled slows from one end – meant England got the 132 needed for victory easily, if slowly. The match was finished in mid-afternoon on the fourth day and the Ashes had been won.

== Ceylon stopover ==
The Australians had a stopover in Colombo en route to England, and played a one-day single-innings match there against the Ceylon national team, which at that time did not have Test status.

== Annual reviews ==
- Playfair Cricket Annual 1954
- Wisden Cricketers' Almanack 1954
