= Jim de Courcy =

Australian cricketer (1927–2000)

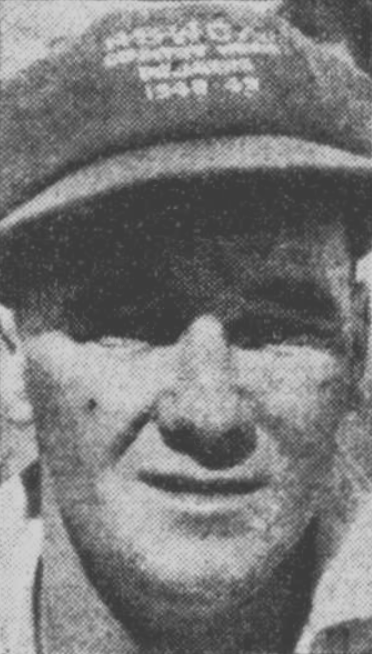

Personal information
- Full name: James Harry de Courcy
- Born: 18 April 1927; Newcastle, New South Wales
- Died: 20 June 2000 (aged 73); Belmont, New South Wales
- Batting: Right-handed
- Bowling: Legbreak

International information
- National side: Australia
- Test debut (cap 197): 9 July 1953 v England
- Last Test: 15 August 1953 v England

Career statistics
Competition	Test	First-class
Matches	3	79
Runs scored	81	3,778
Batting average	16.19	37.03
100s/50s	0/0	6/23
Top score	41	204
Catches/stumpings	3/–	51/–
- Source: Cricinfo, 14 October 2022

James Harry de Courcy (18 April 1927 – 20 June 2000) was an Australian cricketer who played in three Test matches on the 1953 Australian tour of England.

De Courcy was a dashing right-handed middle-order batsman who played for New South Wales for 10 years from the 1947–48 season. A regular as a specialist batsman in the state side from 1949 to 1950, he did not make a first-class century until late in the 1951–52 season, when he hit 114 against South Australia in the Sheffield Shield match at Sydney. That remained his highest score in Australia, though he added a second domestic cricket century the following season, 1952–53, in the match against Victoria at Melbourne.

The 1952–53 season was de Courcy's most successful in Australian cricket, with 503 runs at an average of 41.91 runs per innings. He was picked as an extra batsman for the 1953 tour of England, and outside the Test series on the tour was one of the most successful batsmen in first-class matches, scoring 1214 runs at an average of 41.86. His four centuries on the tour were the four highest scores of his career, and were headed by 204 in an end-of-season match against Combined Services, when he was outdone by 262 not out from Keith Miller, with whom he shared a partnership of 377 in 205 minutes for the fourth wicket.

De Courcy's mid-season form saw him brought into the Test side for the Third Test at Old Trafford. He was, said Wisden Cricketers' Almanack, "brim full of confidence" and he made 41 in quick time, though some of his strokes "flew perilously over the fielders". He retained his place in the Test team for the final two matches of The Ashes series, but added only 40 more runs in five innings, one of them not out.

De Courcy had a good season for New South Wales in 1953–54, improving his batting average to 49.00, though failing to score a century. He did not do well in matches for an Australian XI or New South Wales against the MCC side in 1954-55 and had a poor season in first-class cricket, failing to retain his Test or state place. He made single appearances in each of the next three seasons before retiring into grade cricket in the Newcastle area.

According to his obituary in Wisden, he was a taciturn man who earned the nickname "Words." He was a boilermaker by trade.
