= John Edwards (cricketer, born 1928) =

Australian cricketer

Personal information
- Full name: John Neild Edwards
- Born: 16 August 1928; Melbourne, Australia
- Died: 29 December 2002 (aged 74); Melbourne, Australia

Domestic team information
- Years: Team
- 1955-1960: Victoria
- Source: Cricinfo, 3 December 2015

John Edwards (16 August 1928 – 29 December 2002) was an Australian cricketer. He played 32 first-class cricket matches for Victoria between 1955 and 1960.

Edwards was Australian team manager in the late 1970s and early 1980s. Interviewed several hours after the famous Lillee Miandad incident at Perth in 1981, Edwards said he got on famously with Lillee and he was a pleasure to work with. He said Lillee was a volatile fellow, who caused team management a bit of stress over the aluminium bat incident in the 1979-80 test against England, but overall he spoke well of Lillee.

== See also ==
- List of Victoria first-class cricketers
