= Glossary of cricket terms =

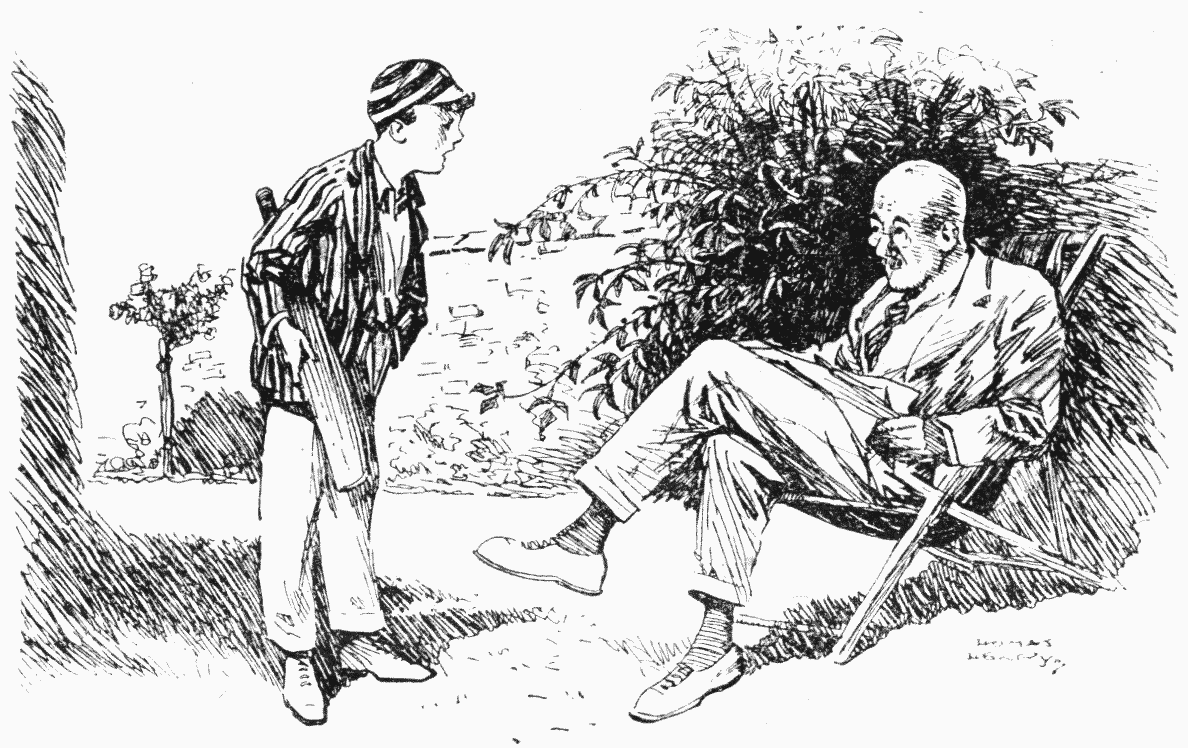
Young Cricketer. "Yes, I cocked one off the splice in the gully and the blighter gathered it." Father. "Yes, but how did you get out? Were you caught, stumped or bowled, or what?" Cartoon from Punch, 21 July 1920.

This is a general glossary of the terminology used in the sport of cricket. Where words in a sentence are also defined elsewhere in this article, they appear in italics. Certain aspects of cricket terminology are explained in more detail in cricket statistics and the naming of fielding positions is explained at fielding (cricket).

Cricket is known for its rich terminology. Some terms are often thought to be arcane and humorous by those not familiar with the game.

== A ==
Abandoned
The result if a match is called off without any play, through no fault of either team. Typically this is due to adverse weather or safety issues. Depending on the regulations of the competition, the abandoned match might be rescheduled for a reserve day, moved to a different ground, or counted as a draw. A match which is called off part-way through instead uses a rain rule or is recorded as no result.
Across the line
A shot which is played with the bat moving lateral to the direction of motion of the ball. Used when the batter is aiming square or behind square, but requires excellent timing. Considered risky, as mistiming the shot can result in a leading edge, being strangled, or missing the ball entirely and being out bowled or leg before wicket.
Action
See bowling action
Agricultural shot
A powerful slog shot across the line (resembling a scything motion), played with little technique or footwork, particularly one that damages the pitch with the bat. May result in the ball going to cow corner.
Air
A delivery by a spin bowler on a higher trajectory than usual, typically phrased as 'giving it some air'. The term flight is a near synonym. Can be combined with top spin or back spin to deceive the batter on the length of the delivery, or with off spin or leg spin to give the ball more time to drift.
All out
The end of an innings due to the batting side running out of wickets, usually because ten of the eleven batters have been dismissed. It also applies if a total of ten players (in any combination) have retired, are absent from the ground, or have been dismissed, leaving only one available batter remaining. The term is a slight misnomer, as there is always one batter left not out.
All-rounder
Traditionally, a player adept at both batting and bowling. Some recent sources regard a wicket-keeper/batter as another type of all-rounder, but this usage is not universal.
Amateur
1. A cricketer who plays for pleasure, not pay. A non-professional.
2. A former official distinction between players of differing social class, important in 18th and 19th century England. Amateurs (also known as gentlemen) were upper class, had usually been to private school or Oxbridge, and could claim expenses but not receive any other payment. Professionals (also known as players) were working class, paid wages, and relied on cricket as their primary source of income. Most county cricket teams consisted of a mix of amateurs and professionals; the captain was always an amateur. The annual Gentlemen vs Players match pitched the two classes against each other. The distinction was abolished after the 1962 season.
Analysis
See bowling analysis
Anchor
A batter who remains in for a long time, scoring at a moderate strike rate whilst preserving their wicket by avoiding risky shots. A less defensive and more flexible version of a blocker. Top- or middle-order batters may adopt an anchor role if the other batters experience a batting collapse.

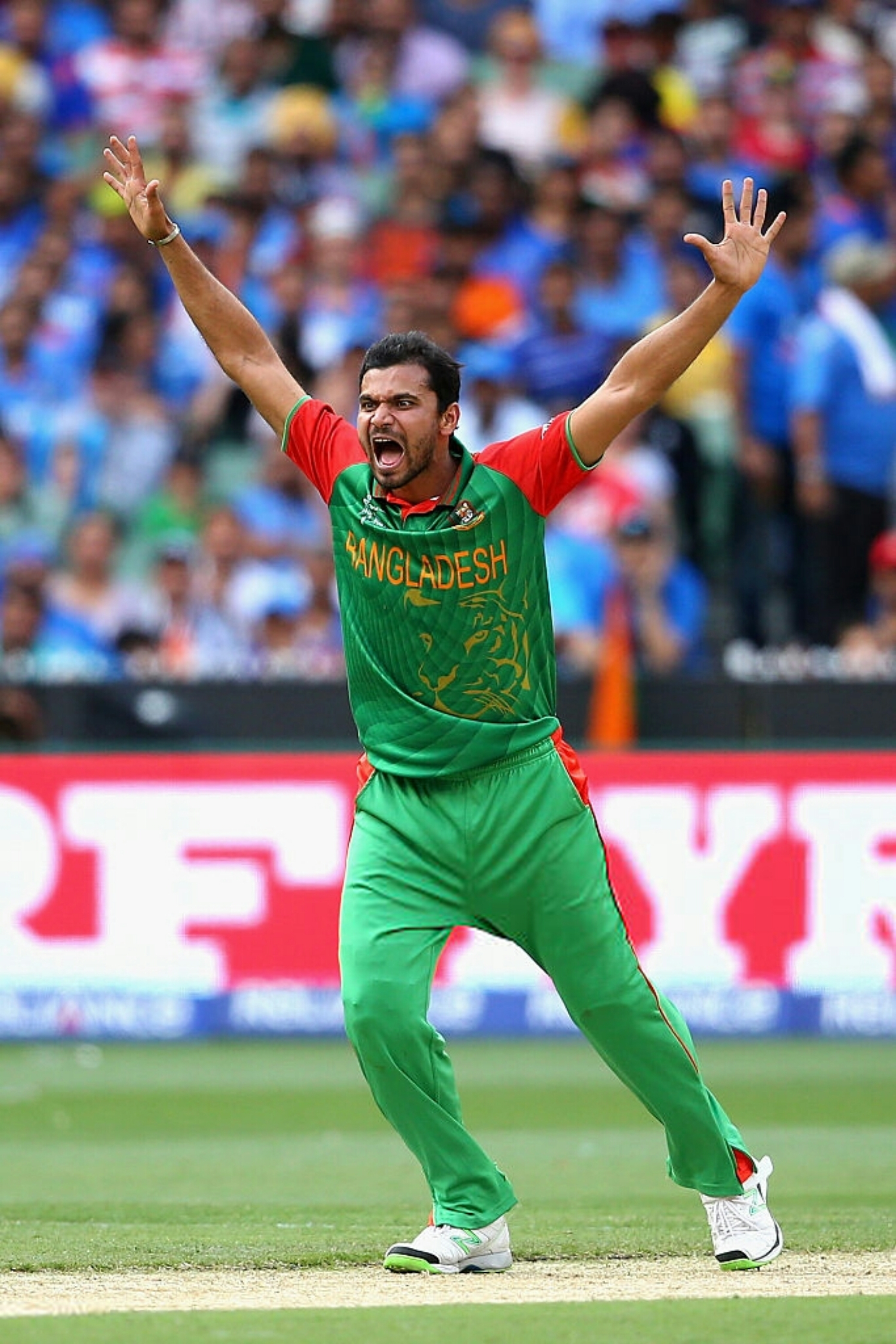
Bowler Mashrafe Mortaza appeals for a wicket during the 2015 Cricket World Cup.

Appeal
A bowler or fielder asking the umpire to dismiss the batter, usually by shouting 'howzat' (how's that?). Variations include 'howzee' (how's he?), or simply turning to the umpire and cheering. The umpire cannot give a batter out unless the fielding side appeals, even if the criteria for a dismissal have otherwise been met. Batters who are obviously out (e.g. bowled or indisputably caught) will normally walk from the field without waiting for an appeal.
Approach
1. The motion of the bowler before bowling the ball; also known as the run-up.
2. The ground a bowler runs on during their run up; e.g.: "Play was delayed because the bowler's approaches were slippery."
Arm ball
A variation bowled by a finger spinner, which appears to be their stock ball but does not spin. Such a delivery does not turn when bouncing but travels straight on i.e. following the line of the bowler's arm, hence the name. An arm ball might also swing.
Around the wicket

A right-handed bowler passing to the right of the non-striker's stumps in their run-up, and vice versa for a left-handed bowler. The opposite of over the wicket.
The Ashes
The trophy for the England v Australia Test match series. The Ashes originated as a result of a satirical obituary published in a British newspaper, The Sporting Times, in 1882 after a match at The Oval in which Australia beat England on an English ground for the first time. The obituary stated that English cricket had died, and the body would be cremated and the ashes taken to Australia. The English press dubbed the next English tour to Australia (1882–83) as the quest to regain The Ashes. During that tour a small terracotta urn was presented to England captain Ivo Bligh by a group of Melbourne women. The urn is reputed to contain the ashes of one or two bails.
Asking rate
See required run rate
Attacking field
A fielding configuration in which more fielders are close in to the pitch so as to take catches more readily, at the risk of allowing more runs to be scored.
Attacking shot
An aggressive or strong hit by the batter designed to score runs.
Audi
Two consecutive pairs, or four consecutive ducks. The term alludes to Audi, a German car manufacturer, whose logo is four linked rings.
Average
1. see batting average
2. see bowling average
Away swing
See outswing

== B ==
Back foot
1. When batting, the foot that is closest to the stumps. For a right-hand batter's stance, the back foot is the right foot; for a left-hand batter it is the left foot.
2. When bowling, the foot which contacts the ground before the front foot i.e. the back foot is the second contact before the ball is released. Usually the back foot is also the bowling foot, unless the bowler's action is off the wrong foot.
Back foot contact
The point in a bowling action when the back foot lands on the ground, just before release of the ball.
Back foot shot
A shot played with the batter's weight on their back foot. Most commonly used when aiming behind square.
Back spin
(Also under-spin.) A delivery with a backward spin, so that after pitching the ball immediately slows down, or bounces lower and skids on to the batter.
Backing up
1. The non-striking batter leaving their crease during the bowler's action, before the ball is released. This shortens the distance the non-striker will need to cover to score a run, if the striker completes a shot. Backing up too far or too early risks a run out, either by one of the fielders, or by the bowler in a mankad.
2. A fielder placing themselves on the far side of the wicket from a team-mate who is throwing the ball at the stumps to attempt a run out. The fielder who is backing up can then recover the ball if the throw misses the stumps, thereby preventing overthrows.
Backlift
Lifting the bat in preparation to hitting the ball.
Badger
A particularly enthusiastic cricketer, someone with an extreme love of the game.
Bad light
In a match played during the day, "bad light" refers to the umpires taking the players from the field because the ambient light has dimmed to the point that the ball has become difficult to see. Done for both fairness and the safety of the batters. Often shortened simply to light. See also offer the light.
Baggy green
A cricket cap of myrtle green colour, which has been worn by Australian Test cricketers since around 1900. The cap is a symbol of Australian cricket, and the term is strongly associated with national cricketing pride.
Bail
One of the two small pieces of wood that lie on top of the stumps to form the wicket.

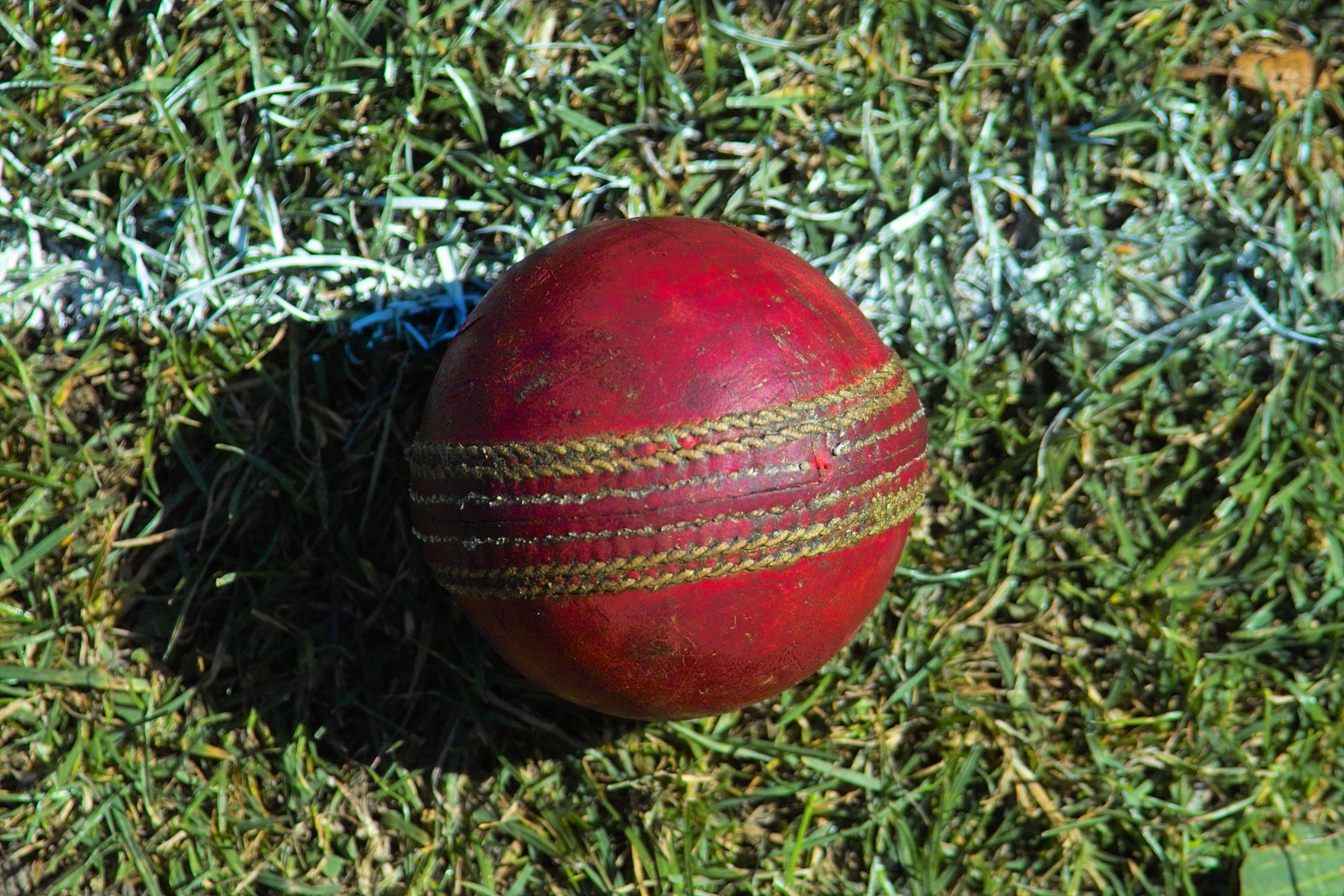
A worn ball

Ball
1. The spherical object which the bowler propels towards the batter, who may attempt to hit it with the bat. Constructed of leather stitched around a cork core. A red ball is used in timed matches (or a pink ball for day/night cricket), whilst a white ball is used in limited overs cricket.
2. A single delivery. Each over contains six (legal) balls.
Ball tampering
Illegally modifying the condition of the ball, usually by a fielder to facilitate swing bowling. Ball tampering is a form of cheating, so accusations are often controversial.
Ball tracking
A computer vision system that determines the location of the ball, tracks its motion, and predicts its future trajectory. Used by the third umpire in the decision review system to assess LBW appeals, and by coaches or commentators to analyse player performances. Common brands include Hawk-Eye and Eagle-Eye, which are sometimes used as genericised trademarks for the concept.
Bang (it) in
To bowl a delivery on a shorter length with additional speed and force. The bowler is said to be "bending their back" when banging it in.

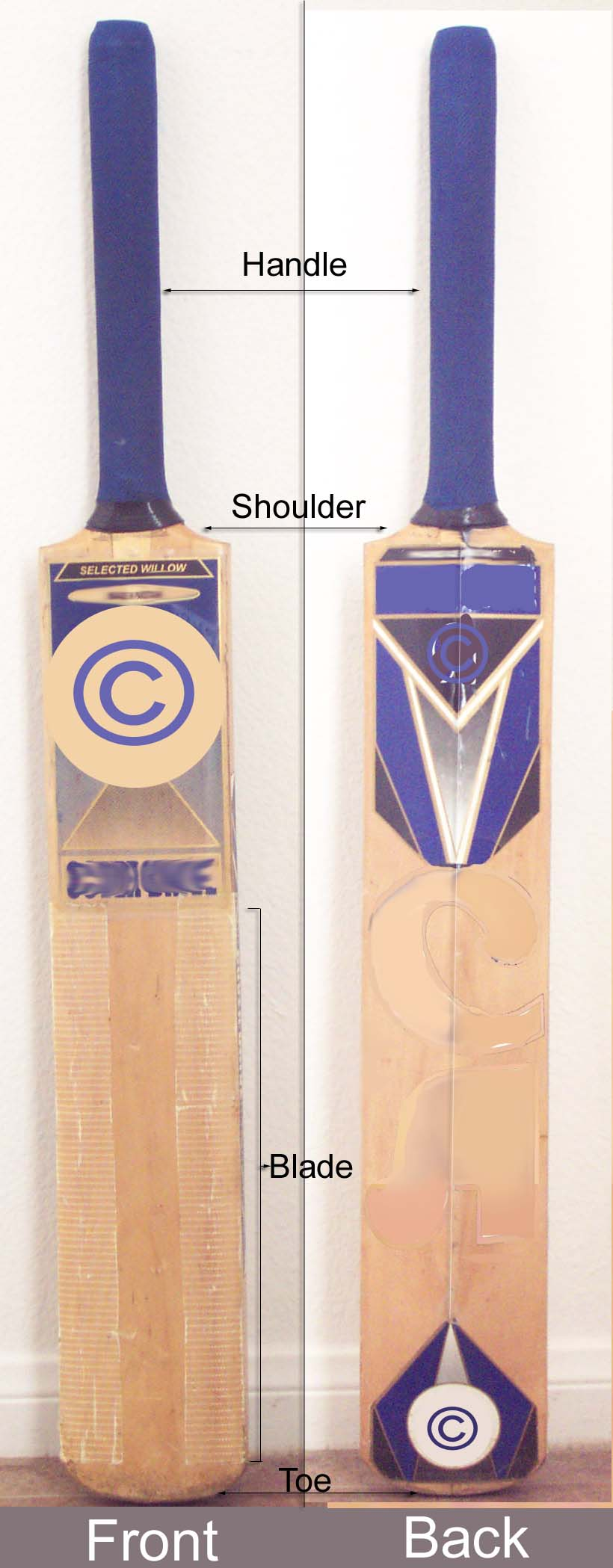
A typical cricket bat, showing the front and back with the main parts labelled

Bat
The wooden implement which the batter uses to hit the ball. Usually constructed in two pieces, the rectangular-sectioned blade and cylindrical handle, which are joined at the splice.
Bat-pad
A fielder placed close to the batter on the leg side to catch the ball if it hits the bat and pad (in either order), and rises to a catchable height. Also a defence against being given out lbw, that the ball may have hit the bat first, however indiscernible.
Batter

A player on the batting side, or one of the two members of the batting side who are currently at the crease, or (in the context of a player's career) a player whose speciality is batting. The term 'batsman' was used for most of the game's history, regardless of the player's gender, but the gender neutral term 'batter' began to be adopted in the 2010s and was made official in the Laws in 2021.
Batting
The act and skill of defending one's wicket and scoring runs.
Batting average
The average number of runs scored per innings by a batter, calculated by dividing the batter's total runs scored by the number of times the batter was out.
Batting collapse
When several batters are dismissed in rapid succession for very few runs. The terms top order collapse or middle order collapse may refer to batting collapses in a specific part of the batting order.
Batting for a draw
Defensive batting in a timed match by a team with little chance of victory, who are instead attempting to salvage a draw. The batters seek to survive as many balls as possible before losing their wicket, without attempting to score many runs and avoiding aggressive shots. Sometimes regarded as boring to watch, and sometimes as producing tense finishes.
Batting order
The order in which the batters bat, from the openers, through the top order and middle order to the lower order.
Beach cricket
An informal form of the game played on beaches, particularly in Australia, New Zealand, Sri Lanka and cricket-playing Caribbean countries.
Beamer
A delivery that reaches the batter above waist height without bouncing. This is illegal and an automatic no-ball. Further sanctions are applied to repeat offences, though the exact rules have changed several times. Since 2019, if the umpire believes that the beamer was dangerous and risked injury to the batter, they issue a first and final warning to the bowler; a second dangerous delivery results in the bowler being banned from bowling for the remainder of that innings.
Beat the bat
When a batter narrowly avoids touching the ball with the edge of their bat, through good fortune rather than skill. Considered a moral victory for the bowler. The batter is said to have been beaten. In some cases, this may be expanded to "beaten all ends up".
Beehive
A diagram showing where a number of balls, usually from a particular bowler, have passed the batter. Compare pitch map.
Beer match
In club cricket, where the scheduled game ends early, a friendly match concocted to fill in time, originally where licensing hours would have prevented the teams from retiring to the pub, but also for love of the game. Often played with an unusual format, such as "reverse batting order", "every outfielder must bowl", or "bats retire at 25".
Belter
A belter of a pitch is a pitch offering advantage to the batter.
Bend the back
Of a pace bowler, to put in extra effort to extract extra speed or bounce.
Benefit season
A series of fundraising events to reward a long-serving player, typically those who have played over a decade for a single county cricket team, shortly before the player retires. Similar in concept to testimonial matches played in other sports.
Best bowling
The bowling analysis with the most wickets taken in an innings; the fewest runs conceded are used as a tie-breaker. This can be used to compare different bowlers within a single match, or to highlight the best performance by an individual over an extended period, such as a season or their whole career. The equivalent for batters is the high score.
Biffer
slang term for an attacking batter. A biffer is the opposite of a blocker, being a defending player. In earlier times (particularly pre-World War II) cricketers were either amateur (Gentlemen) or professional (Players). Typically, but not universally, amateurs would be "biffers" and professionals "blockers". The word derives from the slightly archaic transitive verb, "biff" which means "hit". Today, biffers tend to be known as big hitters.
Bite
the turn a spin bowler is able to produce on a pitch.
Block
A defensive shot, intending to stop the ball safely without attempting to score runs. The most common form of block is the forward defensive.
Blocker
slang term for a defensive or slow-scoring batter, the opposite of biffer. In earlier times (particularly pre-World War II) cricketers were either professional or amateur. Typically, but not universally, amateurs would be "biffers" and professionals "blockers". The word derives from the natural tendency of such batters to "block" each delivery, rather than try to score runs. Such players tend to have low strike rates, but in many cases high averages due to their lack of aggressive shots giving bowlers less chances to dismiss them. They are typically less effective in limited overs cricket where quick scoring is often needed, though some are able to adapt their game to score quicker in the shorter formats of the game.
Block hole
the gap between the bottom of the bat and the batter's toes. This area is the target for a yorker, as it is difficult to block unless the batter is expecting it.
Blob
See duck
Bodyline (or fast leg theory)
a historical tactic involving fast bowling aimed at the batter's body with numerous close fielders placed on the leg side. Bodyline was developed in the early 1930s and used by England (who called it "fast leg theory") during the 1932–33 Ashes Tour. The tactic was highly controversial, leading to accusations of unsporting behaviour and deliberately attempting to injure or intimidate the batters. Changes to the rules were brought it to outlaw dangerous deliveries and to limit the number of leg-side fielders and bouncers, making bodyline obsolete.
Boot Hill
Another term for short leg, the least liked and most dangerous of the fielding positions. The term is derived from this potential for getting hit by the ball, being a reference to the Boot Hills of the American West, graveyards for those who "died with their boots on". Due to its unpopularity the position has traditionally been taken by the junior professional, although this is no longer necessarily the case. According to former England fielding coach Richard Halsall, a good short leg has to be physically brave, an outstanding catcher, and preferably a good reader of the batter, and are indeed normally batters themselves.
Bosie or bosey
See googly
Bottom hand
The hand of the batter that is closest to the blade of the bat. Shots played with the bottom hand often are hit in the air.

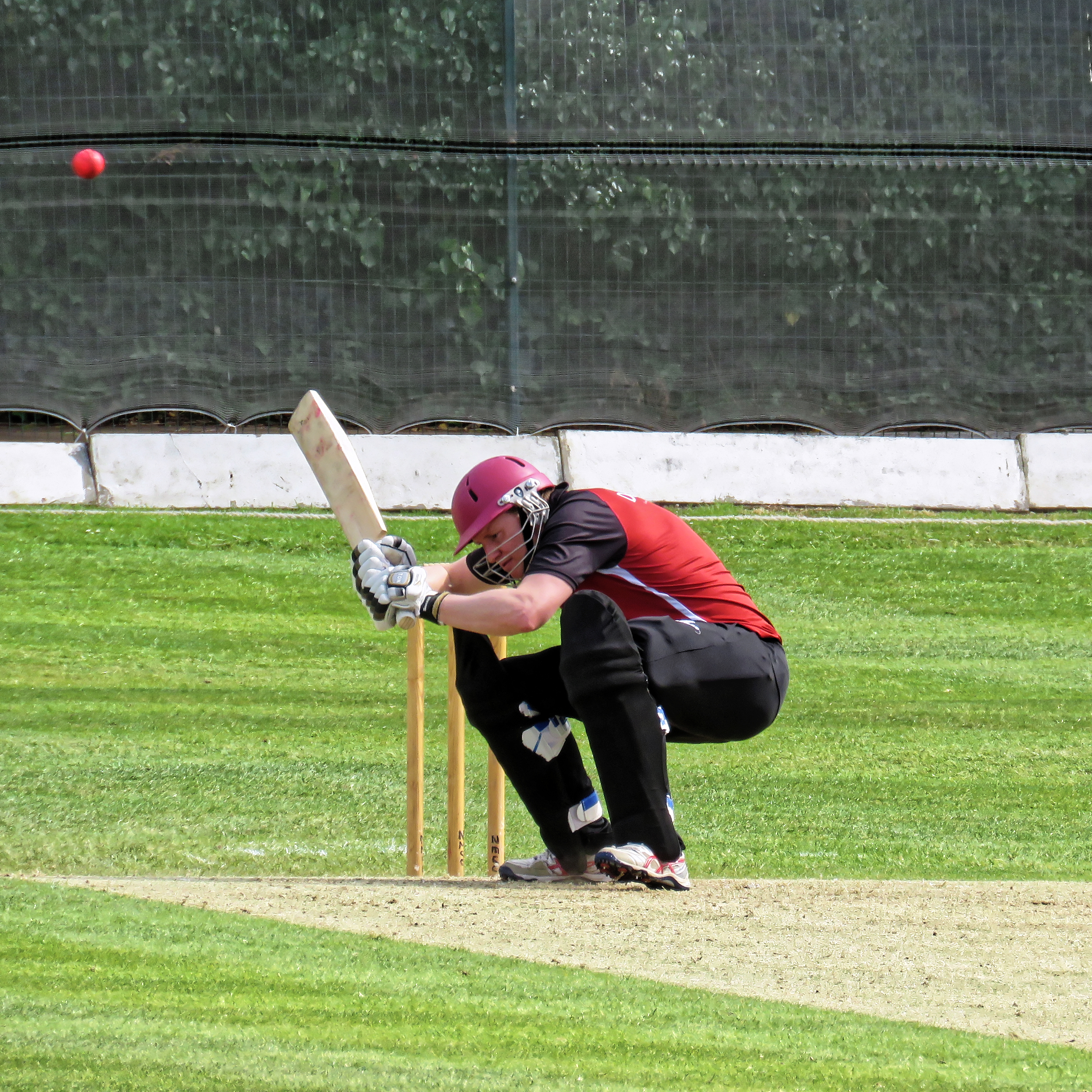
A batter ducks under a bouncer.

Bouncer
a fast short pitched delivery that rises up near the batter's head.
Bounce out
to get a batter out with the aid of bounce, often by getting them caught out
Boundary
1. the perimeter of the field
2. a rope that demarcates that perimeter
3. a shot which reaches (or passes over) the boundary rope. If the ball touches the ground before reaching the boundary, the shot scores four runs. If it does not touch the ground before reaching the rope, the shot scores six runs.
Bowled
a mode of a batter's dismissal. Occurs when a delivery hits the stumps and removes at least one bail.
Bowled around the legs
out bowled by a delivery which passes the batter on the leg side before hitting the wicket. The term implies that the batter has moved too far over to their off side.
Bowled out
1. see all out.
2. Sometimes incorrectly used in place of bowled.

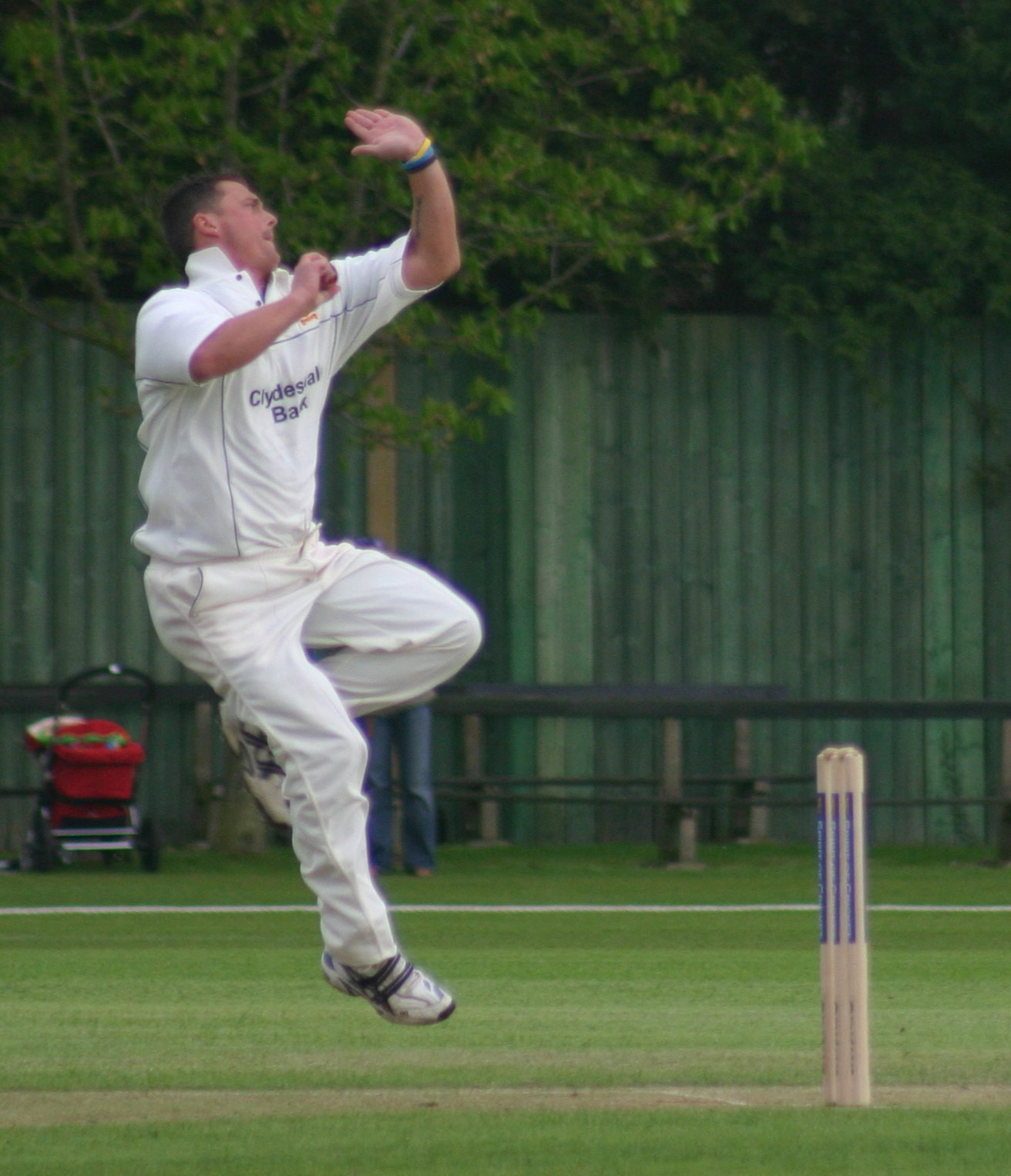
Bowler Darren Gough winds up to deliver a ball.

Bowler
1. The player who is currently bowling.
2. A player who specialises in bowling.
Bowling
the act of delivering the cricket ball to the batter.
Bowl-out
A method for breaking a tie which was used in some limited overs matches in the late 20th and early 21st centuries; most competitions have replaced it with the super over. Five players from each team bowled at an undefended wicket, with the team with the most hits winning. Sudden death was used if the number was equal. The concept was analogous to the penalty shootout used in other sports.
Bowling action or action
The set of movements a bowler goes through in a delivery.
Bowling analysis or bowling figures
A statistical summary of a bowler's performance. Two formats are common: either the numbers of overs–maidens–runs conceded–wickets, or the shorter numbers of wickets/runs e.g. 12-2-46-3 or 3/46, pronounced 'three for forty-six'.
Bowling at the death
See death overs
Bowling average
The number of runs conceded by a bowler, divided by the number of wickets they have taken. One of several statistics used to compare the performances of bowlers over extended periods; lower is better.
Box
a protective item shaped like a half-shell and inserted into the front pouch of a jockstrap with cup pocket worn underneath a player's (particularly a batter's) trousers to protect their genitalia from the hard cricket ball. Also known as an abdominal protector, Hector protector, ball box, protector, athletic cup, protective cup or cup.
Brace
two wickets taken off two consecutive deliveries.
Break
a suffix denoting the ball changing direction after pitching caused by the bowler's spin or cut. For example, a leg spinner will deliver leg breaks (moving from leg to off).
Buffet bowling
see cafeteria bowling.
Bump ball
A ball played off the bat immediately into the ground and then caught by a fielder. Often this has the appearance of being a clean catch directly off the bat.
Bumper
old-fashioned name for a bouncer.
Bunny
see rabbit.
Bunsen
A pitch on which spin bowlers can turn the ball prodigiously. From the rhyming slang: 'Bunsen Burner' meaning 'Turner'.
Buzzer
see overthrows
Bye
extras scored in the same way as normal runs when the ball does not make contact with any part of the batter (bat, protective gear, body parts).

== C ==
Cafeteria bowling

Poor quality bowling which is easy to hit, allowing the batters to help themselves to runs, analogous to a self-service cafeteria or buffet. Occasionally employed deliberately as declaration bowling.
Call
1. A shouted announcement by a fielder while the ball is in the air, usually the word "mine", indicating that they are about to attempt a catch. Considered good practice, to avoid two fielders colliding if both attempt to take the same catch.
2. A shouted, normally single word, instruction from a batter to their partner, indicating whether to attempt a run. Only one batter makes a call, to avoid confusion that could lead to a run out. Responsibility for making the call is held by whichever batter has the better view of the ball and can see whether any fielders are close to it. This is most often the striker for a shot in front of square, and the non-striker for a shot behind square. Common possible calls include yes, no, wait, push, one, two or three.
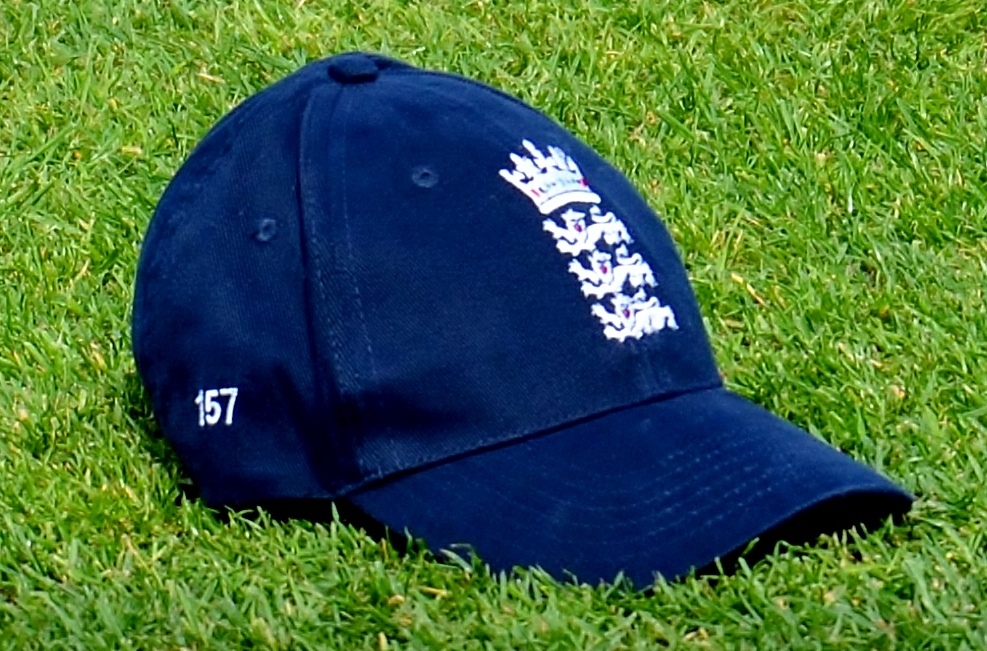
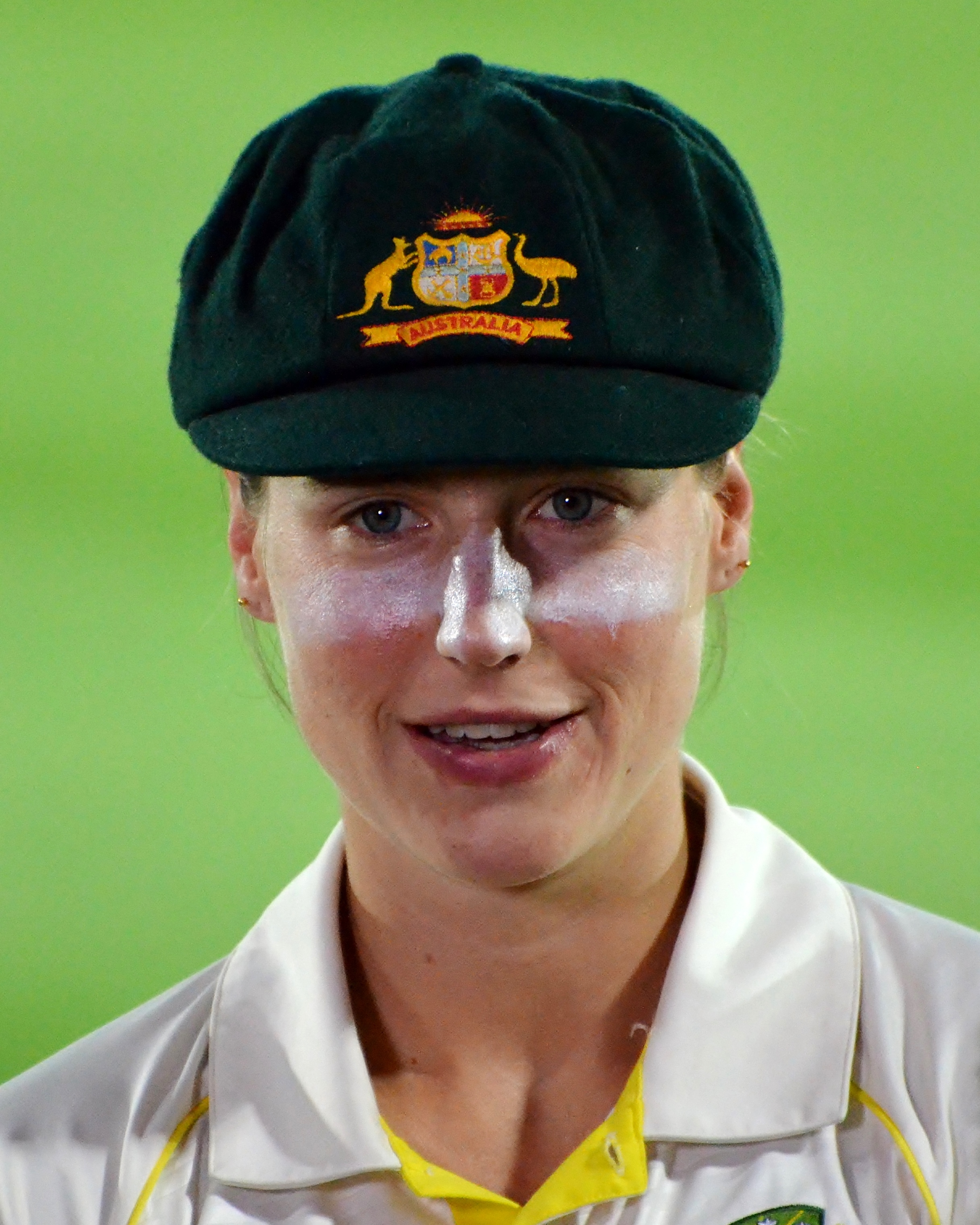
Two examples of cricket caps: the blue cap of England and the baggy green of Australia
Cap
1. A type of soft material hat, traditionally worn by fielders.
2. An appearance for a national team.
Captain

The player who has been appointed leader of their team. The captain decides which bowler will deliver each over, the placement of the fielders, the batting order, when to use the decision review system, whether and when to declare, and many other aspects of the game. The captain's tactical abilities can have a major impact on the outcome of a match. The captain often has substantial responsibilities between games as well, such as in team selection or representing the team in the media.
Carrom ball
a style of slow bowling delivery in which the ball is released by flicking the ball between the thumb and a bent middle finger in order to impart spin
Carry
1. A shot has carried if the ball is hit in the air and reaches a fielder without touching the ground (regardless of whether the fielder then successfully takes a catch). If the ball touches the ground before reaching the fielder, it has not carried. Slow-motion television replays are sometimes required to determine whether the ball carried or bounced a few inches in front of the fielder.
2. The distance which a delivery bounces through to the wicketkeeper if the batter does not play a shot. The wicketkeeper must position themselves at an appropriate distance behind the stumps for the carry, which depends on the hardness of the pitch, height of the bowler, the length they are bowling etc.
Carry the bat

An opener batting through an entire innings, remaining not out at the conclusion. The rest of the team must be all out (not any other end of innings scenario). Regarded as an excellent performance by the opening batter.
Cartwheel
The motion of a stump when hit by a delivery hard enough that it rips out of the ground and flips end-over-end before landing, like a gymnastic cartwheel.
Castled
Clean bowled usually by a yorker or a full length ball.
Catch
A fielder gaining complete control of the ball, in one or both hands, before it touches the ground. The wicketkeeper may use gloves, but no other fielder may use any other equipment or clothing to assist in taking the catch. A fair catch leads to the batter being caught.
Caught
a method of dismissal in which one of the fielders, including the bowler, catches the ball before it touches the ground after the batter hits it (with either the bat or a glove that is in contact with the bat). This is the most common method of getting a batter out in professional cricket.
Caught and bowled
Dismissed by a catch taken by the bowler. The term originates from the way such dismissals are recorded on a scorecard (c & b); the alternative "bowled and caught", referring to the sequence of events in the strict chronological order, is almost never used.
Caught behind
Dismissed by a catch taken by the wicket-keeper. Usually from an edge or glove, but sometimes from a skier.
Centurion
A player who has scored a century.
Century
1. A score of at least 100 runs by a single batter; considered a substantial personal achievement.
2. (rare) An ironic term for a bowler who has conceded over 100 runs in an innings.
Chance
An opportunity to dismiss a batter that isn't taken by the fielding side. Common examples include a shot that carries to a fielder who then drops the catch; a possible run out in which the fielder's throw misses the stumps; or a fumble by a wicketkeeper during an attempted stumping. If a batter does not provide any chances to the opponent, it is referred to as a "chanceless innings" or "chanceless knock". Some commentators refer to a very difficult opportunity as a "half chance".
Charge
A batter moving quickly towards to the bowler while the delivery is in flight, to gain momentum for a powerful shot (often a slog). A more aggressive version of a dance down, with even higher risk, so usually only attempted in the death overs.
Check upstairs
Invoke the Umpire Decision Review System, especially by the umpires themselves. The third umpire is usually seated high in the stadium, and replays are often displayed on elevated screens, hence the expression.
Cherry
1. Slang term for a red ball, especially in Australia.
2. A red mark left on a bat by the impact of a red ball, most commonly a new ball (which has fresh red dye on its surface).
Chest on

1. A bowler whose chest and hips are aligned towards the batter at the instant of back foot contact.
2. A batter whose hips and shoulders face towards the bowler at the moment of release.
Chin music
The use of a series of bouncers from pace bowlers to intimidate a batter. Term taken from baseball.
Chinaman
see left-arm unorthodox spin
Chinese cut
see French cut
Chop on
to be bowled by the ball deflecting off the inside or bottom edge of the bat and onto the stumps while playing a shot
Chuck
of a bowler, to throw the ball by bending the elbow instead of bowling it with a straight arm; also chucker: a bowler who chucks; and chucking: such an illegal bowling action. All are considered offensive terms as they imply cheating.
Circle
a painted circle (or ellipse), centred in the middle of the pitch, of radius 30-yard (27 m) marked on the field. The circle separates the infield from the outfield, used in policing the fielding regulations in certain one-day versions of the game. The exact nature of the restrictions vary depending on the type of game: see limited overs cricket, Twenty20 and powerplay (cricket).
Clean bowled
bowled, without the ball first hitting the bat or pad.
Club
1. A group of cricketers, from which one or more teams are formed.
2. To strike the ball gracelessly, but with great force. A weaker form of slog.
Club cricket

Formally organised cricket played by skilled amateurs. Considered a higher standard of play than purely recreational village cricket, but still lower than professional forms of the sport.
Collapse
see batting collapse
Come to the crease
A phrase used to indicate a batter walking onto the playing arena and arriving at the cricket pitch in the middle of the ground to begin batting.
Competitive Women's Cricket
The official designation given to the female equivalents to First-class, List A and T20 cricket.
Compulsory close (cc)
When a team's innings is closed and completed by a means other than being all out or declaring. This particularly applies in grade cricket competitions where each innings of a two-innings match is also subject to a time or overs limit. The letters (cc) appear in the team's score to reflect this; e.g. 266–7(cc).
Conventional swing
see swing
Contrived circumstances
Unusual tactics which are intended to achieve a legitimate outcome, but result in wild statistical abnormalities; for example, deliberately bowling extremely poorly to encourage a quick declaration. Wisden excludes records set in contrived circumstances from its official lists.
Cordon

Collective term for multiple fielders in the slips. Sometimes also includes gully.
Corridor of uncertainty
A good line and length, around the top of off stump or just outside it (on fourth stump). A delivery in this region is difficult for a batter to decide whether to leave it, play a forward defence or attacking shot, and whether to be on the front foot or back foot.
County cricket
the highest level of domestic cricket in England and Wales.

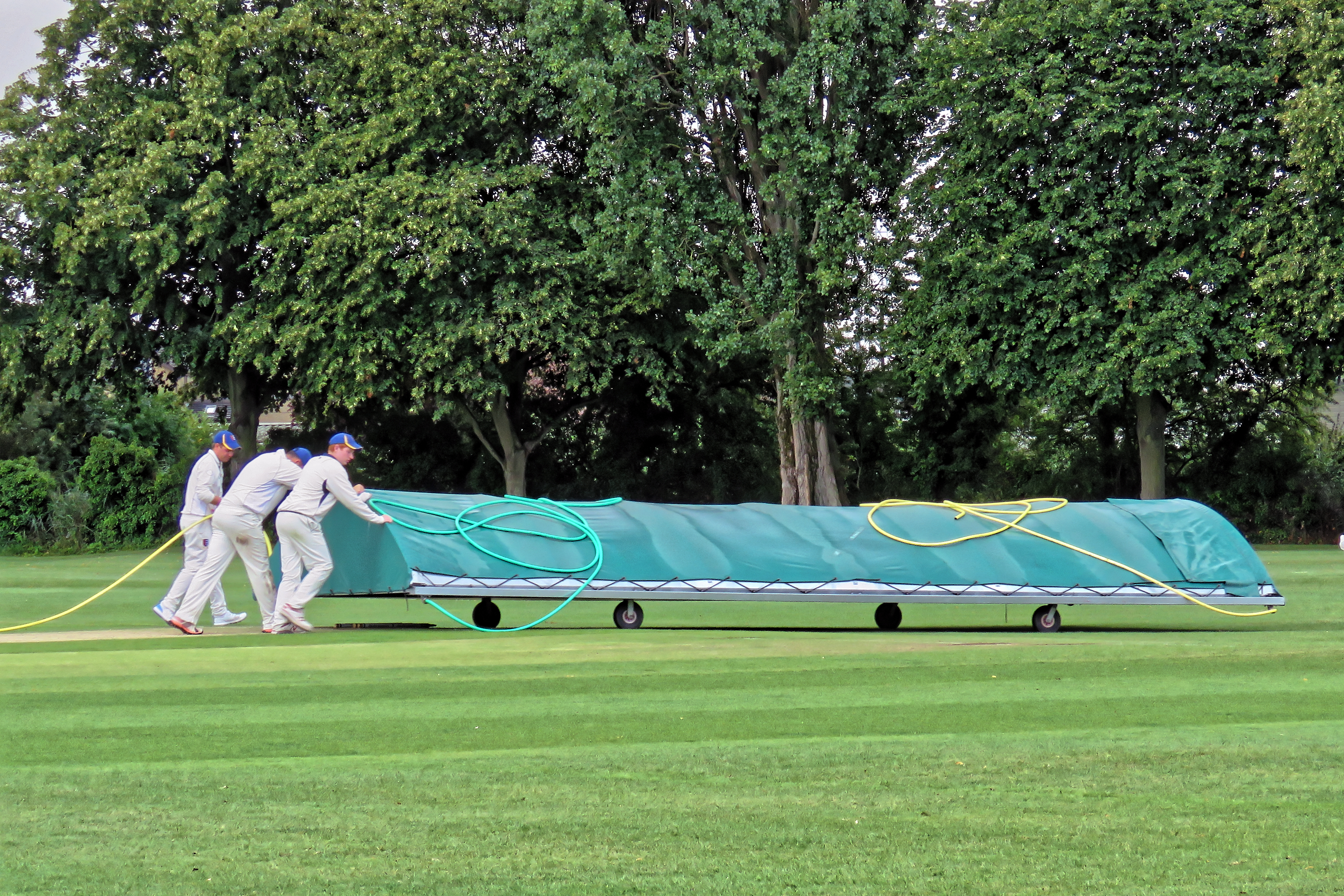
A wheeled cover being removed from the pitch

Cover

1. A fielding position on the off side, forward of point and squarer than mid-off. A cover fielder situated closer to point than usual is known as cover point, whilst one which is closer to mid-off is known as extra cover. The plural term 'the covers' refers to all these variants collectively.
2. A waterproof assembly or tarpaulin used by the ground staff to protect parts of the field from rain (usually the pitch, square and run ups).
Cow corner
the area of the field (roughly) between deep mid-wicket and wide long-on. So called because few 'legitimate' shots are deliberately aimed to this part of the field, so fielders are rarely placed there – leading to the concept that cows could happily graze undisturbed in that area.
Cow shot
a hard shot, usually in the air, across the line of a full-pitched ball, aiming to hit the ball over the boundary at cow corner, with very little regard to proper accepted technique. A type of slog.

Diagram showing the locations of the crease lines on the pitch

Crease
a straight whitewash line painted on the pitch near the stumps. At each end of the pitch there are four creases: the 'popping crease', 'bowling crease' and two 'return creases'. The word 'crease' without further qualification refers either to the popping crease or to the region beyond it. The creases are used to adjudge whether a run has been completed, a batter is run out, the delivery is a no-ball or wide etc.
Cricketer
a person who plays cricket.
Cross-bat shot
a conventional shot played with the bat parallel with the ground, such as a cut or a pull. Also known as a horizontal-bat shot, it is generally considered a potentially risky option for batters.
Cross the rope
To cross over the boundary rope. Often said of batters who are beginning or resuming an innings, players entering or exiting the field to begin a session of play, fielders attempting catches, and the ball when the batter scores a boundary
Cut
a shot played square on the off side to a short-pitched delivery wide of off stump. So called because the batter makes a "cutting" motion as they play the shot.
Cutter
a break delivery bowled by a fast or medium-pace bowler with similar action to a spin bowler, but at a faster pace. It is usually used in an effort to surprise the batter, although some medium-pace bowlers use the cutter as their stock (main) delivery.

== D ==
Daddy hundred
Informal term for a batter's individual score that is substantially higher than a century. Some coaches set a requirement of at least 150 runs, but that value is not universal.
Daisy cutter
1. A low-trajectory delivery in which the ball bounces twice, or rolls along the ground, before reaching the batter. A type of no ball.
2. A shot in which the ball travels on a low trajectory, bouncing just above the grass. This retains more speed than a rolling ball, while being very difficult to catch.
Dance down (the pitch)
A batter using footwork to move closer to the bowler while the delivery is in flight, typically with a skipping motion, changing the effective length. A near-synonym of charge, but less aggressive. Considered risky, because if the batter misses their shot they are likely to be stumped or run out.

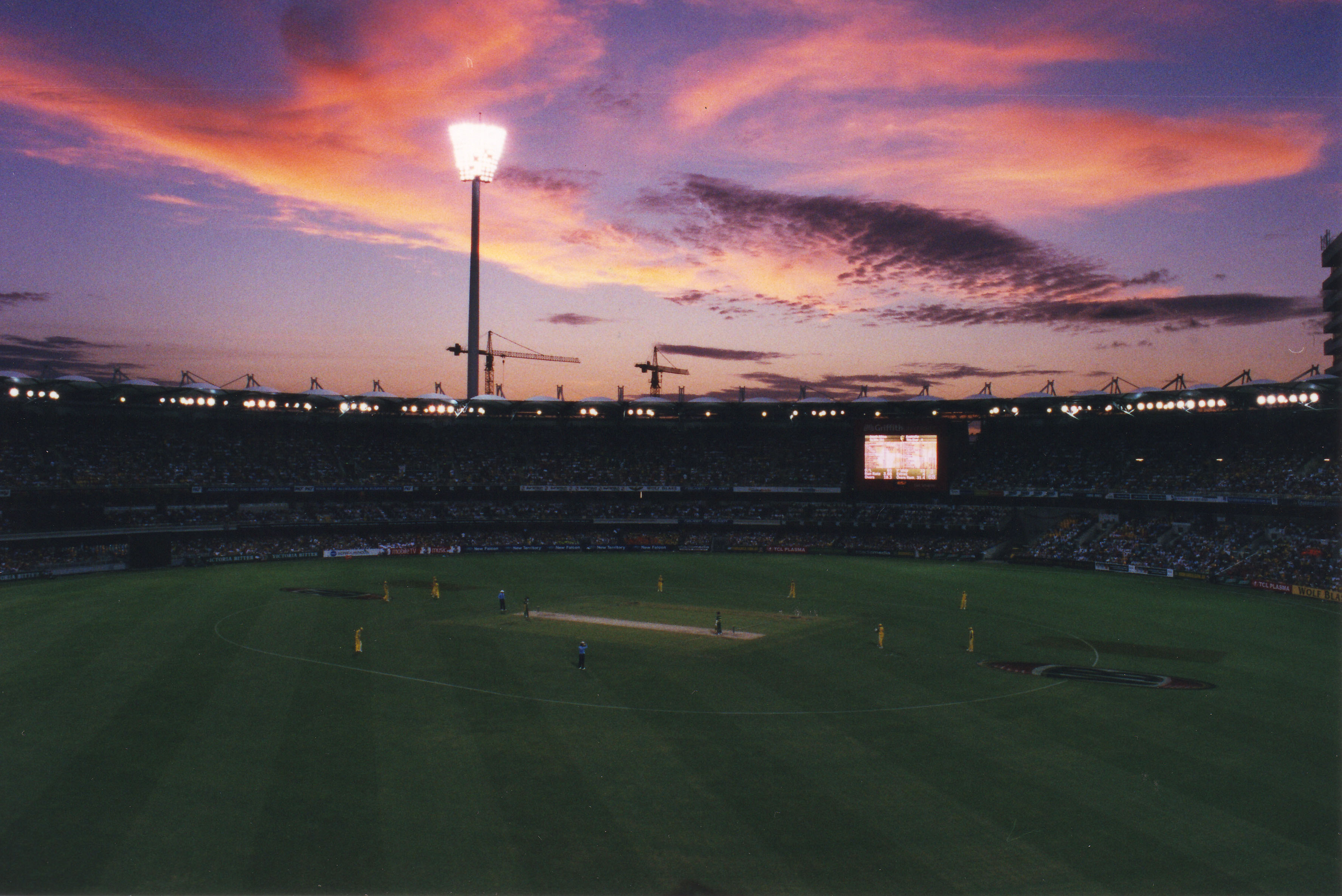
A day/night match, between Australia and South Africa at The Gabba in 2006

Day/night cricket
a cricket match scheduled to begin during day time and end after sunset, using floodlights. Used in some one day internationals since 1979, and Test matches since 2015.
DB
see dot ball
Dead ball
1. the state of play between deliveries, during which batters may not score runs or be given out. There are numerous situations where play becomes dead, see dead ball.
2. a signal given by the umpire to indicate a state of dead ball. Used only if the state is not obvious to the players.
Dead bat
A defensive shot with the bat held in a loose grip or angled towards the ground. If the ball strikes the bat it loses momentum and falls quickly to the ground. Used to reduce the chance of being caught off an edge.
Dead rubber
A match played in a series after one side has gained an unassailable lead, e.g. has already won 3 matches in a 5-match series, or in a tournament if both teams have already qualified (or failed to qualify) for the subsequent rounds. The term is used disparagingly to imply that the match is of lesser importance, but some regard the concept as outdated.
Death bowler
A bowler who specialises in delivering the death overs at the end of a limited overs match. Because batters usually play very aggressively in this period, a death bowler must be particularly skilled at variations which are difficult to score from or unexpected by the batter, such as yorkers and slower balls.
Death overs

The final few overs of an innings in a limited overs match. Because only runs matter in determining the result, a batting side with wickets in hand will bat very aggressively in this period, seeking to hit every delivery for a boundary, even if it risks a dismissal. Typically the batting strike rate is highest in this period, and the bowler's economy is poorest.
Death rattle
The sound of the ball breaking the wicket when a batter is out bowled.
Debenture
a certificate of loan agreement, used by some professional clubs to raise funding. Typically, investors loan money to the club for a fixed period in return for guaranteed free (or reduced price) match tickets during that period.
Decision review system (DRS)
see Umpire Decision Review System.
Declaration
the act of a captain voluntarily bringing their side's innings to a close, in the belief that their score is now great enough to prevent defeat. Occurs almost exclusively in timed forms of cricket where a draw is a possible result (such as first-class cricket), in order that the side declaring have enough time to bowl the opposition out and therefore win.
Declaration bowling
deliberately poor bowling (specifically Full tosses and Long hops) from the fielding team with the intention of allowing the batters to score runs quickly and thus encourage the opposing captain to declare, thereby giving both teams a reasonable chance of winning in a timed match which would otherwise have been inevitably drawn. Non-specialist bowlers will often be used in this context, largely to preserve dignity (and the bowling averages) of the specialist bowlers. This may occasionally be seen in domestic first-class cricket, where the points systems used often show little penalty between a draw and a loss; but it would very seldom be seen in Test cricket where the consequence of a loss in the context of a series is greater. Cf. Cafeteria bowling.
Deep
(of a fielding position) further away from the batter and closer to the boundary.
Defensive field
A fielding configuration in which fielders are spread around the field so as to more readily stop hit balls and reduce the number of runs (particularly boundaries) being scored by batters, at the cost of fewer opportunities to take catches and dismiss batters.
Delivery
the act of bowling the ball; also, the quality of the way in which a ball is bowled, in either intent or effect.
Devil's number

a score of 87, regarded as unlucky in Australian cricket. Superstition holds that batters are more likely to be dismissed for 87, because it is 13 runs short of a century (see triskaidekaphobia).
Diamond duck
regional usage varies, but either a dismissal (usually run out) without facing a delivery, or a dismissal (for zero) off the first ball of a team's innings (the less common term platinum duck is used interchangeably).
Dibbly dobbly

1. a medium pace delivery, neither fast nor slow, with no special variation.
2. a bowler who uses this type of delivery as their stock ball.
3. a delivery that is easy to hit, but difficult to score quickly from.
Dilscoop
see paddle scoop
Dink
a deliberately gentle shot played by a batter, without attempted power, in order to guide the ball into an unguarded area of the field, largely using the ball's own momentum from the delivery. Often effective against fast bowlers.
Dinner
the second of the two intervals taken during a full day's play specifically during a day/night test.
Dipper
a delivery bowled which curves into or away from the batter before pitching.
Dismissal
Take the wicket of one of the batters, so they must cease batting for the remainder of the innings. A batter who has been dismissed is referred to as out; if ten members of the batting side are dismissed (or retire), the team are all out. There are ten possible methods, but the vast majority of dismissals are one of five types: caught, bowled, leg before wicket, run out and stumped.
Direct hit
a throw from a fieldsman that directly strikes and puts down a wicket (without first being caught by a fieldsman standing at the stumps). Occurs when attempting a run out.
D/L
see Duckworth-Lewis method
DLS
see Duckworth-Lewis method
Dobbing
a synonym for Mankad, specifically used in Lancashire and some neighbouring counties
Doctored pitch
a cricket pitch which has been intentionally prepared in a specific manner in order to gain a competitive advantage for the home team, such as creating a dry, crumbly surface that particularly favours the home team's spin bowlers, or a firm, grassy surface which would favour fast bowlers, or any surface which exacerbates perceived weaknesses in the visiting team's batting. Whilst widely considered unsporting, the practice is comparatively common and is (within reason) legal, but the term is always used pejoratively.
Dolly
a very easy catch.
Donkey drop
A ball with a very high trajectory prior to bouncing.
Doosra
A delivery by a finger spin bowler which turns in the opposite direction to the stock delivery. The word is Hindi/Urdu (Hindustani) for 'second' or 'other'. Some bowlers can perform the required bowling action legally, whilst others cannot do so without throwing, which is often ascribed to physiological differences.
Dorothy
rhyming slang for six, referring to the author Dorothy Dix.
Dot ball (DB)
a delivery bowled without any runs scored off it, so called because it is recorded in the score book with a single dot.
Double
normally the scoring of a 1000 runs and the taking of 100 wickets in the same season.
Down the pitch

referring to the motion of a batter towards the bowler prior to or during the delivery, made in the hope of turning a good length ball into a half-volley.
Drag
before the current "front foot rule" was introduced, bowlers had to release the ball with the rear foot behind the bowling crease; there were instances of bowlers (especially Gordon Rorke) managing to "drag" the rear foot forward before release and not being no-balled.
Draw
1. a result in timed matches where the team batting last are not all out, but fail to exceed their opponent's total. Not to be confused with a tie, in which the side batting last is all out or run out of overs with the scores level.
2. an antiquated stroke that has fallen into disuse, it was originally a deliberate shot that resembled the French cut – the ball being played between one's own legs.
Draw stumps
Declare the game, or a day's play, over; a reference to withdrawing the stumps from the ground by the umpire.
Drift
the slight lateral curved-path movement that a spinner extracts while the ball is in flight. Considered very good bowling as it increases the difficulty for a batter to correctly judge the precise movement and path of the ball .
Drinks
an agreed short break in play, generally taken in the middle of a session, when refreshments are brought out to the players and umpires by the twelfth men of each side. Drinks breaks do not always need to take place, but they are usual in test matches, particularly in hot countries.
Drinks waiter
a jocular term for the twelfth man, referring to his job of bringing out drinks.

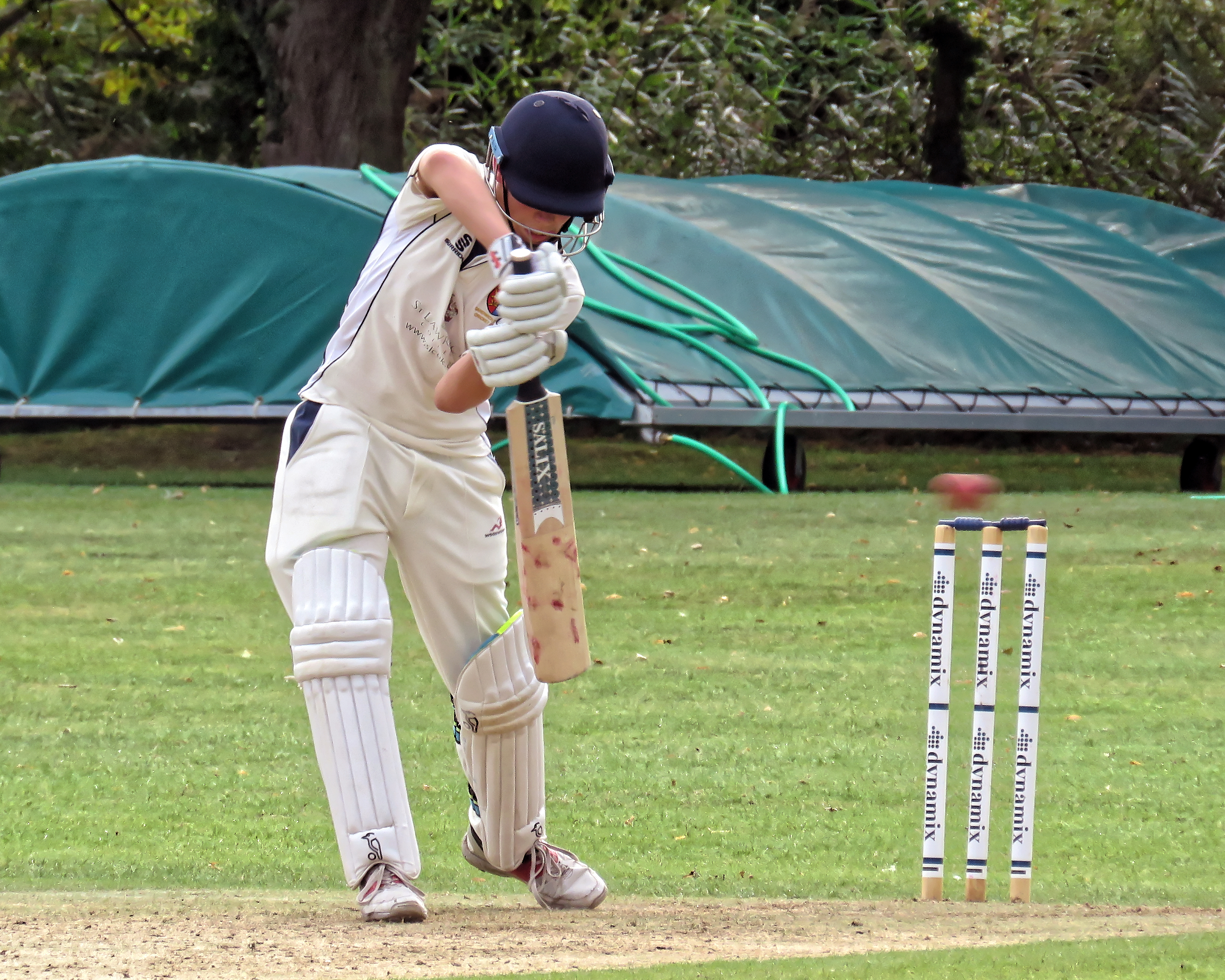
A left-handed batter plays a drive shot through the covers

Drive
a shot played with a straight bat on the front foot, aiming anywhere between point on the off side and mid-wicket on the leg side. The drive is the most common shot for scoring runs, and often considered the most aesthetically pleasing. Several sub-types are recognised depending on direction, including the square drive, cover drive, off drive, straight drive and on drive.
Drop
1. the accidental "dropping" of a ball that was initially caught by a fielder, thus denying the dismissal of the batter; when such an event occurs, the batter is said to have been "dropped".
2. the number of dismissals which occur in a team's innings before a given batter goes in to bat; a batter batting at 'first drop' is batting at number three in the batting order, going in after one wicket has fallen.
3. the act of excluding a player from selection in a squad even when they were included in the most recent prior selection.
Dropper
Obsolete term for a delivery by lob bowling, or a bowler who employed this style. Common in the 19th century, this form of bowling is now usually illegal.
Drop-in pitch
a temporary pitch that is cultivated off-site from the field which also allows other sports to share the use of the field with less chance of injury to the players.
DRS
see Umpire Decision Review System
Duck
a batter's score of nought (zero) dismissed, as in "he was out for a duck." It can refer to a score of nought not out during an innings, as in "she hasn't got off her duck yet", but never refers to a completed innings score of nought not out. Originally called a "duck's egg" because of the "0" shape in the scorebook. ( see Golden, Diamond, and Platinum duck )
Duck under delivery
a short pitched delivery that appears to be a bouncer, making the striker duck to avoid from being hit; but instead of bouncing high, it has a low bounce which causes the batter to be dismissed LBW, or occasionally bowled.
Duckworth-Lewis method (D/L)

a rain rule used if a limited overs match is curtailed by bad weather. If the match cannot be completed, the Duckworth-Lewis method determines the winner, or if the match can be continued but needs to be shortened, it calculates a revised target for the team batting second. The mathematical formula is based on analysis of past completed matches. Used in all international matches since 1999, and in most domestic leagues.
Dugout
term taken from association football, a sheltered place just outside the boundary ropes where a team's non-active players and staff sit. Dugouts are a common feature of Twenty20 matches, but pavilions are usually used for any longer forms of the game.

== E ==
Eagle-Eye
see ball tracking
Economical
A bowler who concedes very few runs from their over(s), i.e. has a low economy rate. The opposite of expensive.
Economy rate
The average number of runs conceded per over delivered by an individual bowler. Lower values are better.
Edge
1. The sides of the bat. If the bat is held vertically, they are known as the inside and outside edges; if held horizontally, they are the top and bottom edges. Not to be confused with the toe end.
2. (also snick or nick) A deflection of the ball off the edge of the bat, usually slight and unintentional. A large deflection is known as a thick edge; the opposite is a thin edge. The change in direction is sometimes so small that it isn't visible, but the edge can be detected by the distinct snicking sound it makes. Any edge counts as hitting the ball, so the batter can score runs, but usually gives a chance for a catch in the slips or for caught behind. It can also result in playing on. See also leading edge.
Eleven
another name for one cricket team, which is made of eleven players.
End
An area of the ground directly behind one of the stumps, used to designate what end a bowler is bowling from (e.g. the pavilion end). The bowlers take turns delivering alternating overs from the two ends of the pitch.
End of an innings
The conclusion of a batting side's innings. Mostly commonly, this occurs when they are all out or (in a limited overs match) when the allocated number of overs have been bowled. Other situations where the innings ends are: the side batting last reaches the target, thereby winning the match; the captain of the batting side declares; the allocated time expires (in a timed match), so the result is a draw; or if the officials declare a forfeit.
Expensive
a bowler who concedes a large number of runs from their over(s), i.e. has a high economy rate. The opposite of economical.
Express pace
Fast bowling at speeds above 150 km/h
Extra

A run awarded to the batting team that is not credited to a specific batter. These are recorded separately on the scorecard. There are five types: byes, leg byes, wides, no-balls and penalties. Wides and no-balls are also recorded as runs conceded in the bowling analysis, the others are not attributed to the bowler.
Extra cover
see cover

== F ==
Facing
see on strike
Fall
a verb used to indicate the dismissal of a batter, e.g "The fourth wicket fell for the addition of only three runs".
Fall of wicket (FOW)
the batting team's score at the moment each batter is out.
Farm the strike (also shepherd the strike or farm the bowling)
of a batter, contrive to receive the majority of the balls bowled, usually because they are the more skilled of the two batters in facing the bowling style of the bowler. This usually results in the batter contriving to make an even number of runs (for example, by waiting until certain of hitting a 4 or 6, or by running only 2 when they could have run 3) so that they will again face the bowler. For the same reason, they will try to score a single from the last ball of the over, whereas their weaker partner would not attempt to score from it.
Fast bowling
a style of bowling in which the ball is delivered at high speeds, typically over 90 mph (145 km/h). Fast bowlers also use swing.
Fast leg theory
see bodyline
Feather
a faint edge.
Featherbed
A soft, slow pitch of predictable bounce. Such pitches are considered to be good for batting on, offering little, if any, help for a bowler.
Fence
The boundary. Sometimes used in the phrase 'find(s) the fence', which is said of a ball that is hit to the boundary.
-fer
a suffix to any number, meaning the number of wickets taken by a team or bowler. (See also fifer/five-fer)
Ferret
see rabbit.

Diagram of a typical oval field

Field
1. (noun) a large grass turf area on which the sport is played, forming part of the wider ground. Typically oval, but a wide variety of other shapes are permitted provided they are at least 130 yards (120 m) in diameter. At (or near) the centre of the field is the pitch, and the edge of the field is the boundary, marked by a boundary rope.
2. (verb) the act of fielding.
Fielder (also, more traditionally, fieldsman)
a player on the fielding side who is neither the bowler nor the wicket-keeper, in particular one who has just fielded the ball.
Fielding
Recovering the ball after each delivery. One of the three major skills of cricket (the others being batting and bowling), all members of the team take part in the fielding. If the batter has hit the ball in the air, the fielders can attempt a catch, to dismiss the batter. Otherwise they attempt to prevent the ball crossing the boundary, bring it under control, then return it to the vicinity of the stumps. This is done as quickly as possible, to either stop the batters from scoring runs or to effect a run out.
Fill-up game
when a match finished early a further game was sometimes started to fill in the available time and to entertain the paying spectators.
Find the gap(s)
to play a shot or series of shots along the ground, in the gaps between fielders. The least risky way of scoring runs quickly, but it requires good technique to be able to do consistently. The opposite, finding the man [at some fielding position], is often used when the ball is hit straight to a fielder through the air and is caught.
Fine
of a position on the field behind the batter, closer to the line of the pitch (wicket-to-wicket); the opposite of square.
Finger spin
a form of spin bowling in which the ball is made rotate by the action of the bowler's fingers (contrast with wrist spin). For a right-handed bowler this produces off spin, whereas the same technique by a left-handed bowler produces left arm orthodox spin.
First-class cricket
the senior form of the game; usually county, state or international. First-class matches consist of two innings per side and are usually played over three or more days.
First change
the third bowler used in an innings. As the first bowler to replace either of the opening pair this bowler is the first change that the captain makes to the attack.
First eleven
the best team of (eleven) players at a club, who will be chosen by the selector for the most important or high-profile games. Other players are used if members of the first eleven are unavailable or in less important fixtures. Some large clubs have enough players to operate a hierarchy of teams, in which case the others are known as the second eleven, third eleven etc.
First innings points
In two-innings competitions with a league table to determine standings, in addition to points awarded for winning or tieing a match, a team is also awarded points for taking a first innings lead, i.e. scoring more than their opponents in the first innings.
Fishing
being tempted into throwing the bat at a wider delivery outside off-stump and missing, reaching for a wide delivery and missing. See also waft.
Five-wicket haul (also five-for, five-fer, fifer, shortened to 5WI or FWI, or colloquially a Michelle, in honour of the actress Michelle Pfeiffer.)
five or more wickets taken by a bowler in an innings, considered a very good performance. The term five-for is an abbreviation of the usual form of writing bowling statistics, e.g., a bowler who takes 5 wickets and concedes 117 runs is said to have figures of "5 for 117" or "5–117". A five-wicket haul is traditionally regarded as a special moment for a bowler, just like a century for a batter.
Flamingo shot
A type of shot whereby a batter flicks deliveries from outside off-stump through mid-wicket. It is done when the opposition plays a heavy off-side field and then bowl outside off. This shot was originally invented by Kevin Pietersen. It is also played by James Taylor and by New Zealand tailender Trent Boult
Flash
to wield the bat aggressively, often hitting good line and length deliveries indiscriminately.
Flat pitch
a pitch which is advantageous to the batters and offers little or no help to the bowlers, due to predictable bounce. Also known as a "flat deck"
Flat hit
an aerial shot hit with significant power by the batter which travels fast enough to make the ballistic trajectory of the ball appear flat
Flat throw
a ball thrown by the fielder which is almost parallel to the ground. Considered to be a hallmark of good fielding if the throw is also accurate because flat throws travel at a fast pace.
Flat-track bully
a batter high in the batting order who is very good only when the pitch is not giving the bowlers much help. 'Track' is Australian slang for the pitch. When the 'track' is said to be 'flat' it is at its easiest for the batter, but these are the only conditions under which some players can dominate. When conditions are tough, or when it really counts – they do not.
Flick
a gentle movement of the wrist to move the bat, often associated with shots on the leg side.
Flight
a delivery which is thrown up at a more arched trajectory by a spinner. Considered to be good bowling. Also loop.
Flipper
a leg spin delivery with under-spin, so it bounces lower than normal, invented by Clarrie Grimmett.
Floater
a delivery bowled by a spinner that travels in a highly arched path appearing to 'float' in the air.
Fly slip
a position deeper than the conventional slips, between the slips and third man.
Follow on
a team which bats first in the second innings, after having batted second in the first innings, is said to have followed on. The captain of the team batting first in the first innings may direct the team batting second to follow on if it leads by a certain margin after the first innings; this margin is currently 200 runs in a five-day game, and 150 runs in a three- or four-day game.
Follow through
a bowler's body actions after the release of the ball to stabilise their body.
Football scorecard
When the bowling team takes multiple early wickets while conceding very few runs. It is a reference to a typical football scorecard where both teams have single-digit goals. (For example, a team takes three early wickets by conceding only two runs, causing the scorecard to look 2-3)
Footmarks
On a grass pitch, the bowler creates a rough patch where they lands their foot and follow through after delivering the ball. The rough patch can become cratered and becomes more abrasive as the match continues and more players step on it. The abrasive surface means that the ball will increasingly grip more if it lands in the footmarks. Bowlers, particularly spinners, will aim the ball there as it will turn more sharply, and is more likely to get irregular bounce from such areas, making it more difficult for the opposition batters.
Footwork
the necessary feet movements that a batter has to take so as to be at a comfortable distance from where the ball has pitched, just right to hit the ball anywhere they desire, negating any spin or swing that a bowler attempts to extract after bouncing.
Form
The quality of a player's recent performances. A player who is 'in form' has played well in recent games, so is likely to do so again. Those that are 'out of form' have struggled recently. A run of poor form may result in the player being dropped from the team.
Forty-Five (on the one)
An uncommon fielding position akin to a short third-man, roughly halfway between the pitch and the boundary. Also used for a short backward square leg (at 45° behind square defending a single).

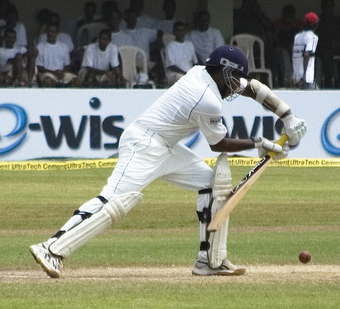
Mahela Jayawardene playing a forward defence

Forward defence (or forward defensive)
A common defensive shot, played with the batter's weight on the front foot and a straight bat held stationary close to the pad. The bat is angled downwards to deflect the ball into the ground in front of the batter, preventing a catch. Considered a safe way of defending against a delivery which threatens to hit the stumps, but is unlikely to score any runs.
Four
a shot that reaches the boundary after touching the ground, which scores four runs to the batting side.
Four wickets (also 4WI)
Also four-for four or more wickets taken by a bowler in an innings, considered a good performance. Mostly used in One Day Internationals and it is a rarer feat in T20 Cricket.
Fourth stump
a position or line one stump's width outside the off stump, i.e. where the wicket's fourth stump would be positioned if it existed. Generally refers to the line or pitch of a delivery. A fourth stump line is roughly synonymous with the corridor of uncertainty.
FOW
see fall of wicket
Free hit
a penalty given in some forms of cricket when a bowler bowls a 'no-ball'. The bowler must bowl another delivery, and the batter cannot be dismissed by the bowler from that delivery. Between the no-ball and the free hit, the fielders may not change positions (unless the batters changed ends on the no-ball).
French cricket
an informal form of the game, typically played by children. The term "playing French Cricket" can imply that a batter has not attempted to move their feet and looks ungainly because of this.
French Cut (also referred to as a Chinese Cut, Surrey Cut, or Harrow Drive)
term for an unintentionally poorly executed shot which results in an inside edge where the ball narrowly misses hitting the stumps.
Such unintentional shots can frequently fool the wicket keeper and may often fortuitously result in runs.
Fritz
To be out stumped following a rebound from the wicketkeeper's pads on to the stumps.
Front foot

1. (of a batter) in the batting stance, the foot that is closest to the bowler and furthest from the stumps.
2. (of a shot) played with the batter's weight primarily on that foot.
3. (of a bowler) during the bowling action, the last foot to contact the ground before the ball is released.
Front foot contact
during the bowling action, the position of the bowler when their front foot lands on the ground.
Fruit Salad
when a bowler delivers a different type of delivery each time, rather than bowling a constant speed, length and angle. Fruit salad bowling is used most commonly in Twenty20 to prevent batters from getting comfortable.
(Full) face of the bat
references the front, or flat side, of the bat, particularly where the manufacturer's insignia is written. A batter is said to have given a bowler or a delivery faced the full face of the bat if they have middled the ball and driven it straight down the wicket, such that the bowler clearly sees the manufacturer's insignia.
Full length
a delivery that pitches closer to the batter than a ball pitching on a good length, but further away than a half-volley.
Full pint
when a stump is knocked completely out of the ground by a delivery.
Full toss (also full bunger in Australia)
a delivery that reaches the batter on the full, i.e. without bouncing. Usually considered a bad delivery to bowl as the batter has a lot of time to see the ball and play an attacking shot. Also, it does not have a chance to change direction off the ground, making it the ultimate crime for a spin or seam bowler.
Furniture
another term for the stumps.

== G ==
Gardening
a batter prodding at the pitch with their bat between deliveries, ostensibly to flatten a bump in the pitch. May be used to inspect features of a deteriorating pitch (e.g. footmarks), or to calm the batter's nerves. Sometimes considered to be time-wasting.
Gate
see through the gate
Genuine number 11
a consistently poor batter, rightfully relegated to the bottom of the batting order.
Getting one's eye in
a batter playing low-risk defensive shots when first in, while they assess the conditions and bowlers, before attempting riskier scoring shots.
Give (it) the treatment
of a batter, to hit a poorly bowled ball well, often for a boundary.
Given man
a skilled player given by the stronger team in a match to the weaker team, with the intention of producing teams with approximately equal strength. This was historically used as a form of handicapping, particularly in Gentlemen v Players matches, to balance the odds for gambling. The practice is now banned at professional level to prevent match fixing, but is occasionally seen in village cricket.
Glance
a shot that goes fine on the leg side. Typically played by flicking a ball which is heading for the batter's hips or thigh.
Glove

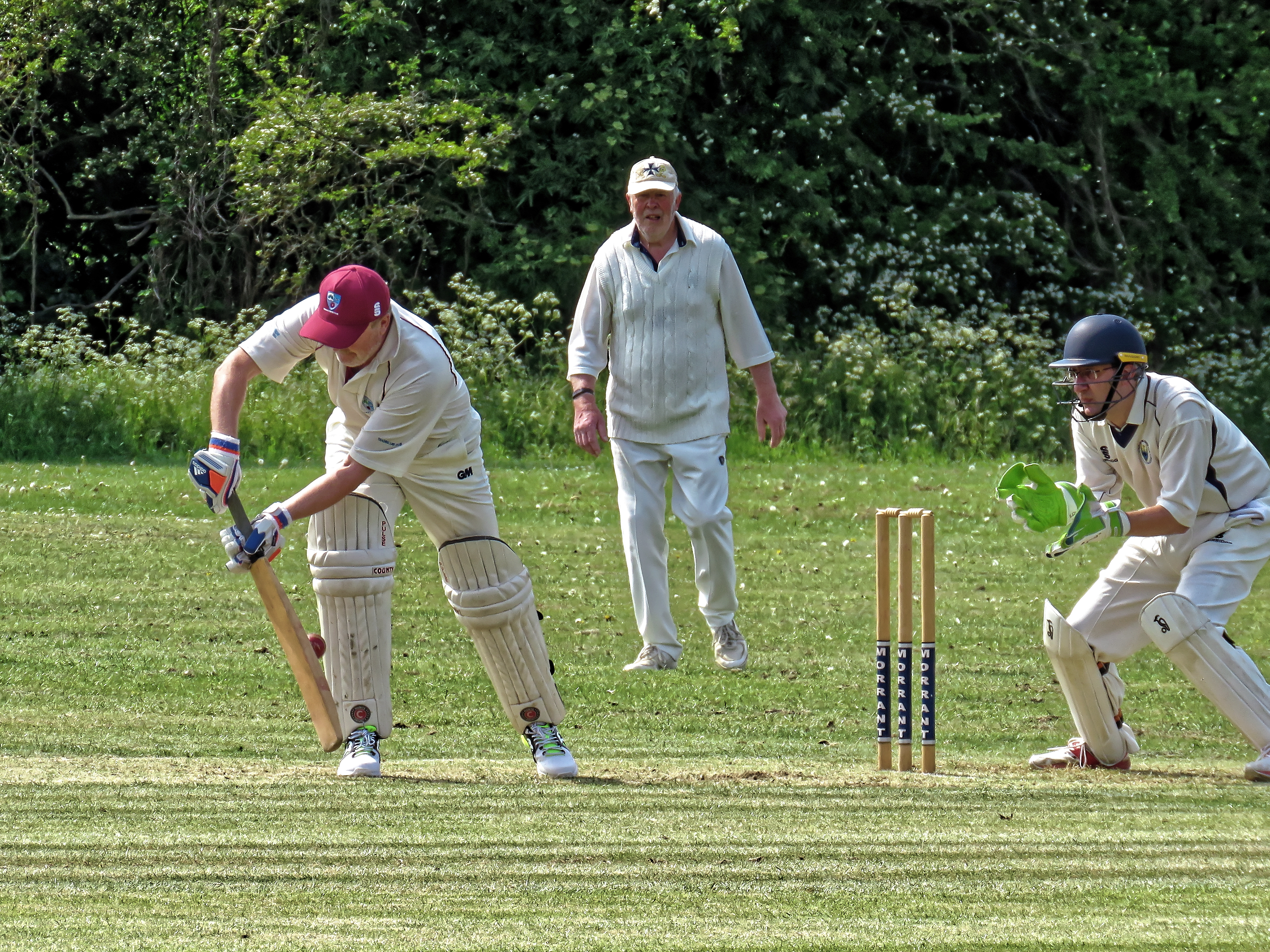
A batter wearing batting gloves and a wicket-keeper wearing wicket-keeping gloves.

1. (noun) Batting gloves, hand protection worn by a batter as part of their kit. Padding is mostly on the outside, to defend against impacts by the ball while gripping the handle of the bat.
2. (noun) Wicket-keeper's gloves, webbed catching gloves worn by a wicket-keeper. The padding is on the inside, to absorb the impact of a caught ball. No other member of the fielding team is allowed to use gloves.
3. (verb) Touch the ball with a batting glove while the glove is in contact with the bat. In that circumstance, the rules consider the glove to be part of the bat, so the batter can score runs or be caught if they glove the ball.
Glovemanship (also glovework)
the skills of wicketkeeping, used when either praising or criticising a performance
Golden duck
a dismissal for nought (zero), from the first ball faced in a batter's innings. ( cf Duck, Diamond duck, Platinum duck )
Golden pair (also King pair)
a dismissal for nought (zero) runs off the first ball faced in each of a batter's two innings of a two-innings match (see this list of Pairs in test and first-class cricket).
Good length
the ideal place for a stock delivery to pitch in its trajectory from the bowler to the batter. It makes the batter uncertain whether to play a front-foot or back-foot shot. A good length differs from bowler to bowler, based on the type, height and speed of the bowler. The "good length" is not necessarily the best length to bowl, as a bowler may wish to bowl short or full to exploit a batter's weaknesses.
Googly (also wrong'un or bosie)
a deceptive spinning delivery by a wrist spin bowler which spins the opposite direction to the stock delivery. For a right-hander bowler and a right-handed batter, a googly will turn from the off side to the leg side. Developed by Bosanquet around 1900.
Gouging
causing intentional damage to the pitch or ball.
Gozza
term in Australian cricket meaning a batter who is out on the first ball they receive. See also Golden duck.
Grade cricket
see club cricket
Grafting
batting defensively with strong emphasis on not getting out, often under difficult conditions.
Grass
to drop a catch, letting the ball fall onto the grass of the field.
Green top
a pitch with an unusually high amount of visible grass, that might be expected to assist the pace bowlers in particular.
Grip
the rubber casings used on the handle of the bat; alternatively, how the bowler holds the ball and how the batter holds the bat.
Ground
1. (noun) A collective term for the pitch, field, pavilion and any associated amenities, such as seating for spectators. Large grounds with substantial spectator facilities may be referred to as stadiums.
2. (verb) Turn and touch the bat onto the ground surface behind the popping crease after the batter has left the crease in the action of taking a shot or starting a run; to run the bat in the process of completing a run in order to be safe.
3. (noun) The batter's safe area on the pitch. The batter is 'in their ground' when a part of the body (usually the foot) or the bat is touching the surface behind the popping crease. They have 'left their ground' if they have advanced down the pitch in the action of taking a shot or starting a run. The batter has 'made their ground' if able to ground their bat or touch the surface behind the popping crease with a part of the body before a fielder can break the wicket for a run out.
Groundsman (or curator)
a person responsible for maintaining the cricket field and preparing the pitch.
Grubber
a delivery that barely bounces.

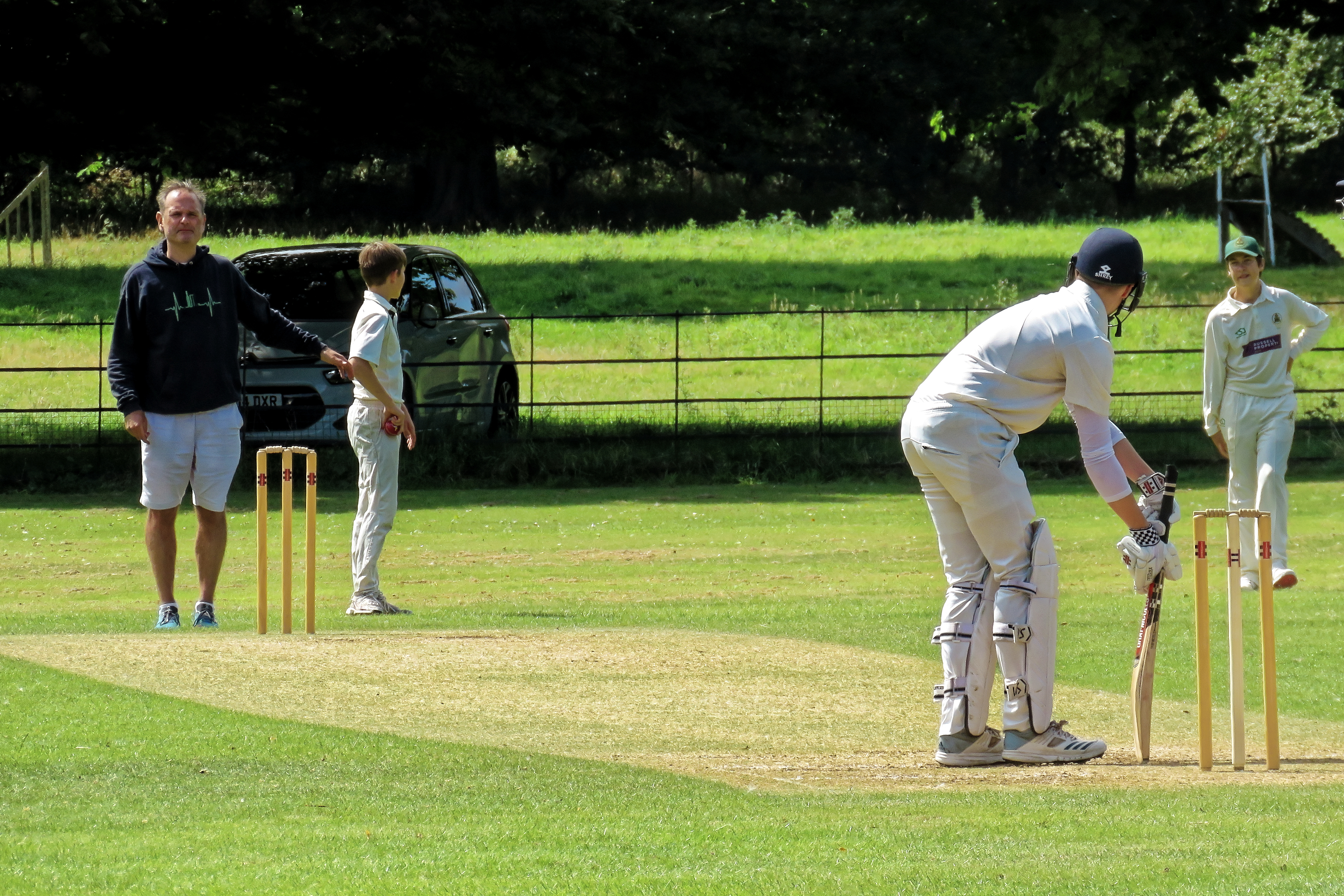
A batter takes guard

(Taking) guard
the batter aligning their bat according with a stump (or between stumps) chosen behind them. Typically, the batter marks the position of the bat on the pitch. The marking(s) give the batter an idea as to where they are standing in relation to the stumps.
Gully
a close fielder near the slip fielders, at an angle to a line between the two sets of stumps of about 100 to 140 degrees.

== H ==
Hack
a batter of generally low skill with an excessively aggressive approach to batting, commonly with a preference towards lofted cross bat shots. A poor defensive stance and lack of defensive strokes are also features of a hack. Can also be used for one particular stroke
Half century
an individual score of 50 runs or more, but less than 100 (century). Reasonably significant landmark for a batter and more so for the lower order and the tail-enders.
Half-tracker
another term for a long hop. So called because the ball roughly bounces halfway down the pitch.
Half-volley
a delivery that bounces just short of the batter so that they can easily strike the ball with an attacking front foot shot such as a drive or glance.
Handled the ball
occurs when a batter touches the ball with their hands (when they are not gripping the bat) while the ball is still live. No longer a method of dismissal in its own right, but can result in the batter being given out.
Harrow drive
see French cut
Hat-trick
a bowler taking a wicket off each of three consecutive deliveries that they bowl in a single match (whether in the same over or split up in two consecutive overs, or two overs in two different spells, or even spread across two innings of a test match or first-class cricket game).
Hat-trick ball
a delivery bowled after taking two wickets with the previous two deliveries. The captain will usually set a very attacking field for a hat-trick ball, to maximise the chances of the bowler taking a hat-trick. The bowler is said to be on a hat-trick before they deliver the hat-trick ball.
Hawk-Eye
see ball tracking
Heavy Roller
a very heavy cylinder of metal used by the ground staff, to improve a wicket for batting.
Helicopter shot
a batting shot played by flicking the ball through the air on the leg side, often to avoid close fielders and attempt to hit a boundary. Well-timed helicopter shots off of fast deliveries can often result in six runs, sometimes toward the cow corner. Helicopter shots are differentiated from slogs and hoicks in that they are somewhat more refined in that they require timing to come off.

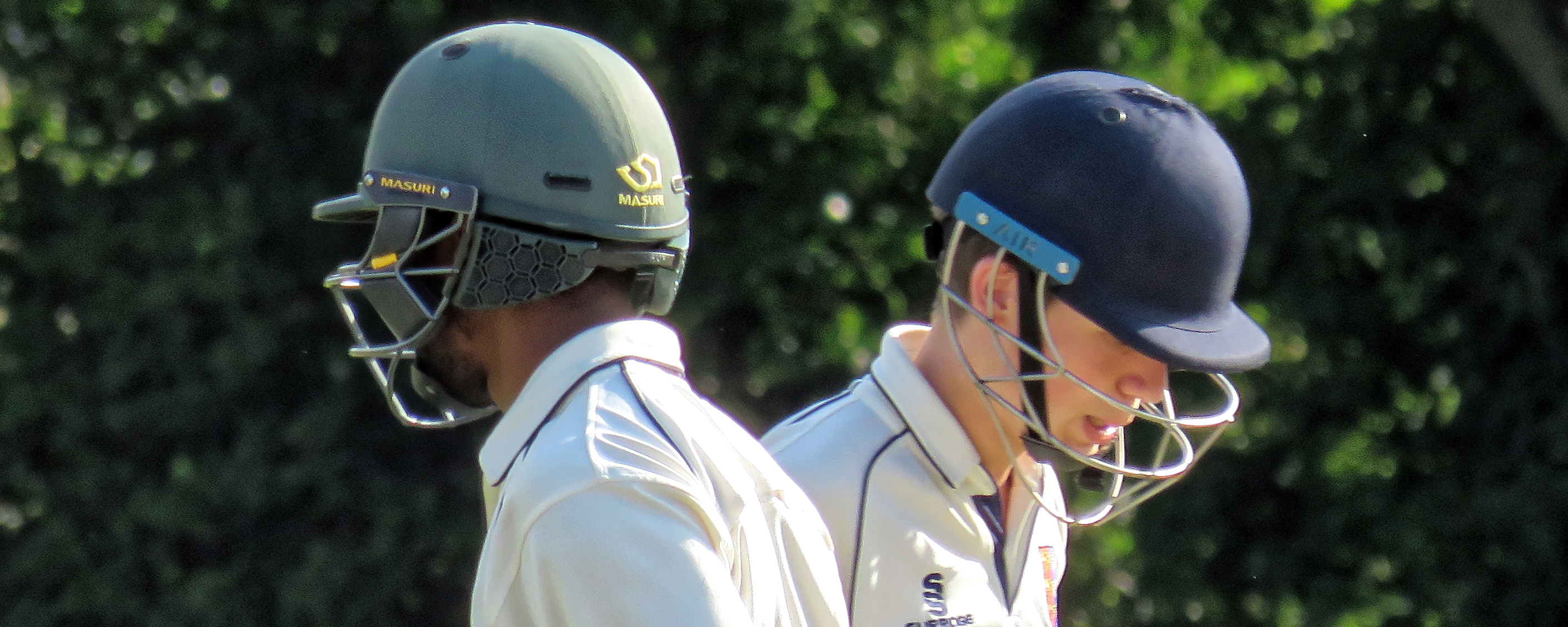
Typical cricket helmets in use

Helmet
Protective headgear worn by batters facing pace bowling or fielders located very close to the batter. Cricket helmets consist of a hard padded hemisphere protecting the brain case, a front brim, and a large metal grill over the face and jaw, with gaps smaller than the diameter of the ball.
High score
the most runs scored by the batter in a single innings. see also Best bowling
Hip Clip
a trademark shot of Brian Lara involving a flick of the wrist to whip a ball, at hip height, at right angles past the fielder at square leg.
Hit the ball twice
A batter is out 'hit the ball twice' if having struck the ball once with their person or bat, they strike the ball a second time with their person or bat (but not a hand not holding the bat). A batter is not out if the second strike was for the sole purpose of guarding their wicket. A batter may not strike the ball a second time to prevent it from being caught (out 'obstructing the field).
Hit wicket
a batter getting out by dislodging the bails of the wicket behind them either with their bat or body as they try to play the ball or set off for a run.
Hoick
an unrefined shot played to the leg side usually across the line of the ball.
Hold up an end
A batter who is intentionally restricting their scoring and concentrating on defence while their batting partner scores runs at the other end; or, a bowler who is bowling defensively to restrict runs at their end while their bowling partner tries to take wickets at the other end.
Hole out
To be dismissed by being caught, usually referring to a catch from a lofted shot (or attempt thereof) in the outfield or forward from the wicket, rather than being caught behind by the wicketkeeper, in the slips cordon, or a leg trap fielder from edges or gloved balls.
Hoodoo
a bowler is said to 'have the hoodoo' on a batter when they have got them out many times in their career. (See rabbit II.)
Hook
a shot, similar to a pull, but played so that the ball is struck when it is above the batter's shoulder.
Hoop
a particularly large amount of swing.
Hot Spot
a technology used in television coverage to evaluate snicks and bat-pad catches. The batter is filmed with an infrared camera, and friction caused by the strike of the ball shows up as a white "hot spot" on the picture.
Howzat or How's that?
See appeal
Hundred
1. See century
2. 100-ball cricket, a limited overs format with modified rules, such as each team batting for up to 100 legal balls, to speed up the game for television broadcasters.
3. The Hundred, a domestic competition in England that uses the 100-ball format, introduced in 2021.
Hutch
the pavilion or dressing room. Non-specialist batters or tail enders can be known as 'rabbits', so when they are given out they return to the hutch.

== I ==
In
of a batter, presently batting.
In/out field
The in/out field is the group of fielders close to the batter or closer to the boundary respectively.
An in/out field is a field setting, usually with 5 close fielders and 3 on the boundary, designed to force batters into errors by trying to deny the opportunity to score singles while saving easy boundaries.
Incoming batter
the batter next to come in in the listed batting order. The incoming batter is the one who is out when a "timed out" occurs.
Inswing or in-swinger
a delivery that curves into the batter in the air from off to leg.
In-cutter
a delivery that moves into the batter after hitting the surface.
Infield
the region of the field that lies inside the 30-yard circle (27 m) or, in the days before defined circles, the area of the field close to the wicket bounded by an imaginary line through square leg, mid on, mid off and cover point.
Innings
one player's or one team's turn to bat (or bowl). Unlike in baseball, the cricket term "innings" is both singular and plural.
Inside edge
The edge of the bat facing the batter's legs. The ball then generally goes on the stumps, legs or at Forty-Five.
Inside-out
when a batter opens the chest and plays a ball, usually aggressively and often dancing down the pitch, toward the covers.
It's (just) not cricket
An idiomatic expression, objecting to actions that the speaker feels are unsporting, unfair, or against the spirit of the game

== J ==
Jack
a number eleven batter. From the jack playing card, which ranks immediately after the number ten in each suit.
Jaffa (also corker)
an exceptionally well bowled, practically unplayable delivery, usually but not always from a fast bowler.
Jayadevan's system
an unsuccessful proposal for a rain rule, as an alternative to the Duckworth-Lewis system. Has never been used in professional cricket.
Jockstrap (also jock strap)
underwear for male cricketers, designed to securely hold a cricket box in place when batting or wicket keeping.
Just not cricket
see it's (just) not cricket

== K ==
Keeper
see wicket-keeper
Keep wicket
1. For a wicketkeeper to field. 2. "Keep wickets in hand", which is when a batting team tries to have relatively few of its batters get out. Usually done so that more run-scoring risks can be taken near the end of their innings in a limited-overs match, since they will have many batters left and only a few balls left.
King pair
see Golden pair.
Knock
a batter's innings. A batter who makes a high score in an innings can be said to have had a "good knock".
Knuckle ball
A type of delivery where the fast bowler holds the ball on the knuckles of their index and middle finger. A type of slower ball.
Kolpak
an overseas player who plays in English domestic cricket under the Kolpak ruling.
Kwik cricket

An informal version of cricket with sped-up rules, specifically designed to introduce children to the sport.

== L ==
Lappa
The Indian version of the hoik. Comes from the English 'lap', an old term for a stroke somewhere between a pull and a sweep.
Lap sweep
Also known as a paddle sweep or run sweep, a sweep shot tickled down to fine leg.
Laws
The laws of cricket are a set of rules established by the Marylebone Cricket Club (MCC) and apply to cricket worldwide. Cricket is one of the few sports for which the governing principles are referred to as 'Laws' rather than as 'Rules' or 'Regulations'. Regulations to supplement or vary the laws may be agreed for particular competitions.
LBW
see leg before wicket
Leading edge
The ball hitting the front edge of the bat as opposed to its face, when playing a straight-bat shot. Often results in an easy catch for the bowler or a skier for someone else.
Leave
The action of the batter not attempting to play at the ball. They may do this by holding the bat above their body. However, there is a clause in the LBW rules making them more susceptible to getting out this way. A batter leaving the ball may also not claim any leg byes.
Left arm
A bowler who bowls the ball with their left hand is, by convention, called a 'left-arm' or 'left arm' bowler (rather than 'left hand' or 'left-handed'). (Contrast "left hand batter".)
Left-arm orthodox spin
the style of spin bowling produced by left-arm finger spin; the left-arm equivalent of off spin.
Left-arm unorthodox spin
the style of spin bowling produced by left-arm wrist spin; the left-arm equivalent of leg spin. Formerly called Chinaman bowling, after Ellis Achong, a West Indian of Chinese descent, but that term is now considered derogatory.
Left hand
A batter who bats left-handed is said to be a 'left-hand' bat. (Contrast "left arm bowler".)
Leg before wicket (LBW)
a way of dismissing the batter. In brief, the batter is out if, in the opinion of the umpire, the ball hits any part of the batter's body (usually the leg) before hitting or missing the bat and would have gone on to hit the stumps.
Leg break
a spin bowling delivery which turns from the leg side to the off side of a right-handed batter. The stock delivery of a leg spin bowler.
Leg bye
Extras taken after a delivery hits any part of the body of the batter other than the bat or the gloved hand that holds the bat. If the batter makes no attempt to play the ball with the bat or evade the ball that hits them, leg byes may not be scored.
Leg cutter
A break delivery bowled by a fast or medium-pace bowler with similar action to a spin bowler, but at a faster pace. The ball breaks from the leg side to the off side of the batter.
Leg glance
A delicate shot played at a ball aimed slightly on the leg side, using the bat to flick the ball as it passes the batter, deflecting towards the square leg or fine leg area.
Leg side
the half of the field to the rear of the batter as they take strike (also known as the on side).
Leg slip
a fielding position equivalent to slip, but on the leg side.
Leg spin
the style of spin bowling produced by right-handed wrist spin. So called because the stock delivery is a leg break. Common variations include the googly, top spinner, and flipper.
Leg theory
A tactic sometimes used by the fielding side. The bowler aims for a line on leg stump and more fielders than usual are placed on the leg side, particularly short catching positions. This prevents the batter from playing shots on the off side. The goal is to slow the scoring and frustrate the batter into an opportunity for a catch. See also fast leg theory and Bodyline. The opposite of off theory.
Leggie
1. a leg spin bowler
2. a leg break delivery

Cricket lengths

Length
the place along the pitch where a delivery bounces (see short pitched, good length, half-volley, full toss).
Life
a batter being reprieved because of a mistake by the fielding team, through dropping a catch, missing a run-out chance or the wicket-keeper missing a stumping.
Light
see bad light
Limited overs match
a one-innings match where each side may only face a set number of overs. Another name for one-day cricket.
Line (also see Line and length)
the deviation of the point along the pitch where a delivery bounces from the line from wicket-to-wicket (to the leg side or the off side).
Line and length bowling
bowling so that a delivery pitches on a good length and just outside off stump. This forces the batter to play a shot as the ball may hit the stumps.
List A cricket
the limited-overs equivalent of first-class cricket.
Lob bowling
An obsolete form of underarm bowling, in which the ball was lobbed high in the air, falling back to the pitch on a steep trajectory. A common variation aimed to drop the ball directly onto the stumps, without bouncing. Lob bowling was popular in the 19th century but is now illegal.
Loft(ed shot)
a type of shot where the ball is hit in the air
Lolly
a ball that a batter is easily able to hit, or a ball that a fielder is easily able to catch
Long hop
a delivery that is much too short to be a good length delivery, but without the sharp lift of a bouncer. Usually considered a bad delivery to bowl as the batter has a lot of time to see the ball and play an attacking shot.
Long off
a fielding position close the boundary on the off side, located in front of, and relatively close to, the line of the wicket.
Long on
a fielding position close the boundary on the leg side, located in front of, and relatively close to, the line of the wicket.
Long stop

a fielding position on the boundary directly behind the wicket-keeper, to recover any byes or wides that evade the keeper. Occasionally seen at village cricket level but obsolete in professional cricket.
Look for two
running a single with urgency, the batters convey the sense (to each other, to the crowd, to commentators) that they will attempt a second run, though no commitment is expected until after the turn. See push, two.
Loop
the curved path of the ball bowled by a spinner.
Loosener
a poor delivery bowled at the start of a bowler's spell.
Lost ball
A ball which cannot be retrieved, due to being lost or otherwise out of reach (e.g. hit into a river or over a fence). The umpire calls dead ball to stop play, and the batter is credited with any runs completed (generally a boundary) or in progress at the time dead ball is called. A replacement ball is selected, preferably a used one in similar condition to the lost ball.
Lower order (colloquially the tail)
the batters who bat at between roughly number 8 and 11 in the batting order and who may have some skill at batting, but are generally either specialist bowlers or wicket-keepers with limited batting ability. Such batters are known as lower order batters or tail-enders.
Lunch
the first of the two intervals taken during a full day's play, which usually occurs at lunchtime at about 12:30 pm (local time).

== M ==
Maiden over
an over in which no runs are scored off the bat, and no wides or no-balls are bowled. Considered a good performance for a bowler, maiden overs are tracked as part of a bowling analysis.
Maker's name
The upper face of the bat, where the manufacturer's logo is normally located. This phrase is sometimes used to describe a batter's technique when playing a straight drive, which gives the opposing bowler full view of the logo e.g. "gave that delivery the maker's name" means the batter played a good drive shot.
Man of the match
an award which may be given to the player whose individual performance was considered the most outstanding, or had the greatest impact on the outcome of the game. Usually (but not always) the highest scoring batter or best performing bowler. Man of the series is the same over a whole series.
Manhattan
also called the Skyline. It is a bar graph of the runs scored off each over in a one-day game, with dots indicating the overs in which wickets fell. The name is alternatively applied to a bar graph showing the number of runs scored in each innings in a batter's career. So called because the bars supposedly resemble the skyscrapers that dominate the skyline of Manhattan.
Mankad
the running-out by the bowler of a non-striking batter who leaves their crease before the bowler has released the ball. It is named after Vinoo Mankad, an Indian bowler, who controversially used this method in a Test match. This is relatively common in indoor cricket and is noted separately from run outs, though almost unheard of in first-class cricket.
Marillier shot
see paddle scoop
Marylebone Cricket Club (MCC)
the cricket club that owns Lord's cricket ground in London NW8. It is the custodian of the laws of cricket.
Match fixing
Illegally arranging the outcome of a match in advance, such as playing deliberately poorly to ensure a loss. Most commonly fixing is due to bribes or collusion with gamblers who bet on the result, see betting controversies in cricket. Fixing outcomes other than the final result is known as spot fixing. This is not only against the rules of cricket, but often against the law of the country where it is played; some cricketers have gone to jail for their involvement in match fixing scandals.
Match referee
an official whose role is to ensure that the spirit of the game is upheld. They have the power to fine players and teams for unethical play.
Maximum
see six.
Meat of the bat
the thickest part of the bat, from which the most energy is imparted to the ball.
Mecca of cricket
this usually refers to the Lord's cricket ground, also known as the Home of Cricket.
Medium-pace
a bowler who bowls slower than a pace bowler, but faster than a spin bowler. Speed is important to the medium-pacer, but they try and defeat the batter with the movement of the ball, rather than the pace at which it is bowled. Medium-pacers either bowl cutters or rely on the ball to swing in the air. They usually bowl at about 55–70 mph (90–110 km/h).
Michelle
See five-wicket haul.
Middle of the bat
the area of the face of the bat that imparts maximum power to a shot if that part of the bat hits the ball. Also known as the "meat" of the bat. Effectively the same as the sweet spot; however, a shot that has been "middled" usually means one that is hit with great power as well as timing.
Middle order
the batters who bat at between roughly number 5 and 7 in the batting order. Often includes all-rounders and the wicket-keeper.
Mid-off
a fielding position intended to save a run on the off side, located in front of, and relatively close to, the line of the wicket.
Mid-on
a fielding position intended to save a run on the leg side, located in front of, and relatively close to, the line of the wicket.
Mid-wicket
a fielding position intended to save a run on the leg side, located between mid-on and square leg.
Military medium
medium-pace bowling that lacks the speed to trouble the batter. Often has derogatory overtones, suggesting the bowling is boring, innocuous, or lacking in variety, but can also be a term of praise, suggesting a military regularity and lack of unintended variation. A good military medium bowler will pitch the ball on the same perfect line and length for six balls an over, making it very hard for the batter to score runs.
Milking (or milk the bowling)
Scoring a steady stream of easy runs at a moderate rate with little risk of getting out, by taking advantage of poor bowling or gaps in the field. Particularly common against spin bowling in limited overs matches, due to the circle restrictions.
Mine
see call
Mis-field
a fielder failing to collect the ball cleanly, often fumbling a pick-up or dropping a catch.
Mullygrubber
(Australian) see grubber

== N ==
Negative bowling
a persistent line of bowling down the leg-side of a batter to stymie the batter from scoring (particularly in Test matches).
Nelson
A score of 111, either for a team or for an individual batter. Superstition holds that this score is unlucky and more likely to lead to a dismissal, due to its resemblance to the three stumps of the wicket (as if the bails had been removed). Tradition holds that the bad luck may be averted if spectators stand on one leg. Scores of 222 and 333 are known as double Nelson and triple Nelson respectively; these are sometimes also considered unlucky.
Nervous nineties
The period of a batter's innings when their score is between 90 and 99. Many players bat nervously in this period because they are worried about getting out before they reach a century. The fielding captain often sets an attacking field to increase the psychological pressure. Some players are particularly prone to getting out in the nervous nineties.

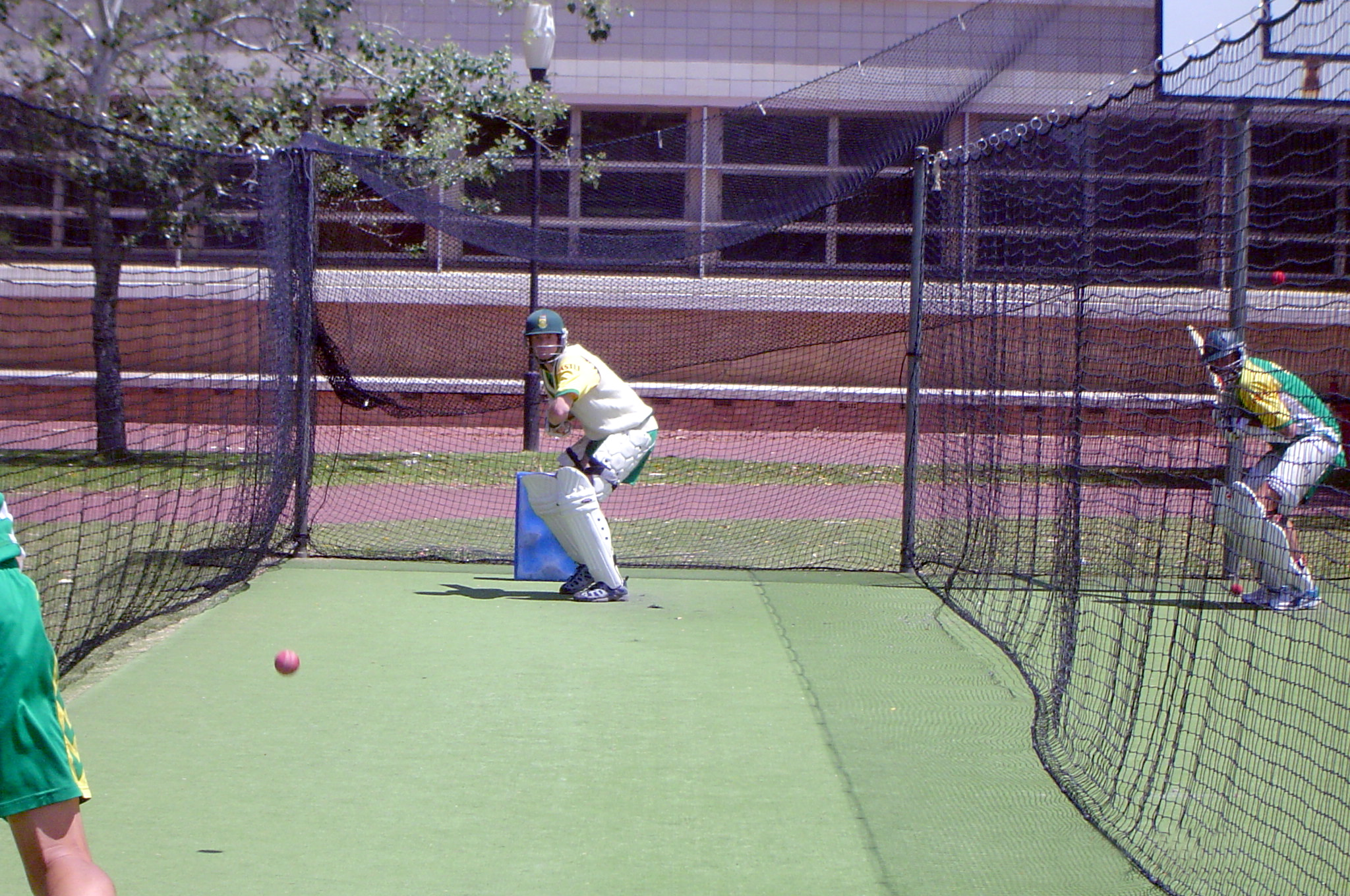
Shaun Pollock in the nets

Nets
a pitch surrounded on three sides by netting, used by for practice by batters and bowlers.
Net run rate (NRR)
In a match, the average run rate scored by a team minus the average run rate scored against them. In a series, a team's NRR is (total runs scored) / (total overs received) – (total runs conceded) / (total overs bowled).
New ball
In professional cricket, a new ball is used at the beginning of each innings. In timed matches, the fielding captain has the option of taking another new ball after 80 overs have passed. A new ball is generally harder and shinier than an old ball, moves faster through the air (favouring pace bowling) and may swing after a few overs of polishing. In contrast, an old ball will be softer, rougher, and will typically have been polished on one side but not the other, favouring reverse swing and spin bowling.
Nibble
A small amount of movement by the ball off the seam.
Nick
Another term for edge or snick.
Nightwatchman
(in a first-class game) a lower order batter sent in when the light is dimming to play out the remaining overs of the day in order to protect more valuable batters for the next day's play.
Nipbacker
A delivery that pitches outside the line of off stump then deviates off the seam, moving towards the batter. Similar to an off cutter but using seam bowling. Usually bowled on a good length or slightly shorter.
No
a call by a batter to their partner, indicating both should return to their crease without attempting a run. cf. yes and wait.
No-ball
an illegal delivery; the batting side is awarded one extra, the bowler must deliver another ball in the over, and the batter cannot be dismissed by the bowler on a no-ball. Most usually a front-foot no-ball, in which the bowler oversteps the popping crease; other reasons include bowling a full toss above waist height (see beamer), throwing, having more than two fielders (excluding the wicketkeeper) behind square on the leg side, or breaking the return crease in the delivery stride.
No man's land
an area of the field where a fielder cannot save a single, nor stop a boundary. Occasionally used to catch a batter who mistimes a shot.
No result
the outcome of a limited overs match in which each team does not face the minimum number of overs required for a result to be recorded, usually due to a rain delay. This is generally equivalent to a draw, but differs in the recording of some statistics.
Non-striker
The batter who is not on strike, so begins the delivery at the same end of the pitch as the bowler. Their partner is the striker. The non-striker cannot score runs or suffer most forms of dismissal, but can be run out or dismissed for obstructing the field.
Nothing shot
An overly tentative shot by the batter: neither a committed attempt to hit the ball, nor a deliberate leave. This often results in an edge, beating the bat, or playing on.
Not out
1. a batter who is in and has not yet been dismissed, particularly when play has ceased.
2. the call of the umpire when turning down an appeal for a wicket.
Nurdle
To score runs, usually in singles, by using low-risk shots to gently nudge the ball into vacant areas of the field.

== O ==
Obstructing the field
An extremely rare method of dismissal. The batter is given out if they wilfully interfere with the fielding, such as blocking a run out or preventing a fielder from taking a catch. Since 2017 obstructing the field includes the offence of handled the ball, which was previously considered a separate method of dismissal.
Occupying the crease
The act of a batter staying in for a long time, without trying to score many runs. This tires the bowler and may frustrate the fielding side in a timed match, but requires skilled defensive batting technique. It is particularly prized among opening batters or when batting for a draw.
ODI
see One Day International
Odds match
a match in which one side has more players than the other. Generally, the extra players were allowed to field as well as bat and so the bowling side had more than 11 fielders.

Animation of an off break delivery

Off break
an off spin delivery which, for a right-arm bowler and a right-handed batter, will turn from the off side to the leg side (usually into the batter).
Off cutter
A cutter which, for a right-handed batter, turns from the off side to the leg side. The pace bowling equivalent of an off break.
Off side
the half of the pitch in front of the batter's body as they take strike. For a right-handed batter this is the right half of the pitch, looking up the wicket towards the bowler, and the left half for the left-handed batter. The opposite of leg side.
Off spin
the style of spin bowling produced by right-arm finger spin. So called because the stock delivery is an off break. Common variations include the arm ball and doosra.
Off the mark
when the first run is scored by a batter, it is said that the batter is off the mark. If a batter gets out without scoring, it is said that the batter failed to get off the mark.
Off theory
A tactic sometimes used by the fielding side. The bowler aims for a line wide of off stump and most fielders are placed on the off side. This prevents the batter from playing shots on the leg side, whilst most of the off side is covered by fielders. The goal is to slow the scoring and frustrate the batters into an opportunity for a catch. The opposite of leg theory.
Offer the light
Under historical rules, offering the light was the act of the umpires giving the batters the choice of whether to leave the field during times of bad light. Offering the light has disappeared from the game since 2010, the decision of whether to leave the field for bad light is made solely by the umpires.
Olympic
Five consecutive ducks. The term alludes to the five interlocking Olympic rings. See also Audi.
On side
see leg side. The opposite of off side.
On a length
a delivery bowled on a good length.
On strike

(of a batter) Located at the opposite end of the pitch from the bowler of the current delivery (or the next delivery, if it is currently dead ball). The batter who is on strike is the striker; their partner is the non-striker.
On the [shot name]
used to describe the type of shot that fielders are placed in order to intercept. For example, "three men on the hook" means three fielders who are placed behind square leg to catch the ball if the hook shot is used. "On the drive" is a similar term used for any type of drive, so generally within a straight 'V' in front of the batter.
On the up
a batter playing a shot, usually a drive, to a ball that is quite short and has already risen to knee height or more as the shot is played.
One-day cricket
an abbreviated form of the game, with just one innings per team, usually with a limited number of overs and played over one day.
One Day International (ODI)
a match between two national sides limited to 50 overs per innings, played over at most one day.
One down
a batter who bats at No. 3 i.e. when the team is "down by one wicket", a crucial position in the team's batting innings.
One short
when a batter fails to make contact with the ground beyond the popping crease, and turns back for an additional run.
Opener
1. an opening batter
2. an opening bowler
Opening batter
One of the two batters who are in at the start of the innings. They must face the opening bowlers and new ball, so require good defensive technique to avoid getting out, especially in a timed match. In a limited overs match an opening batter must also score quickly during the power play.
Opening bowler
One of the two bowlers who begin the innings using the new ball. They are usually the fastest or most aggressive bowlers in the side.
Opposite number
A player on the other team who plays the same role. Often used for captains and wicket keepers.
Orthodox
1. shots played in the accepted "textbook" manner, and batters who play in this manner.
2. see left-arm orthodox spin.
Out
1. the state of a batter who has been dismissed.
2. the word sometimes spoken while raising the index finger by the umpire when answering an appeal for a wicket in the affirmative.
Outdipper
a dipper that curves away from the batter before pitching.
Outright win/loss
a win or loss in a completed match of two innings per team. Used in competitions which award first innings points, as a term to distinguish a one-innings win from a two-innings win.
Outside the line
A batsman cannot be out leg before wicket if the ball pitched outside the line of leg stump. Nor can a batsman be out if the ball hits the batsman outside the line of off stump, unless he/she is offering no stroke.
Outswing
a delivery that curves away from the batter.
Outfield
the part of the field lying outside the 30-yard (27 m) circle measured from the centre of the pitch or, less formally, the part of the pitch furthest from the wickets.
Over
the delivery of six consecutive legal balls by one bowler.
Over rate
the average number of overs bowled per hour.

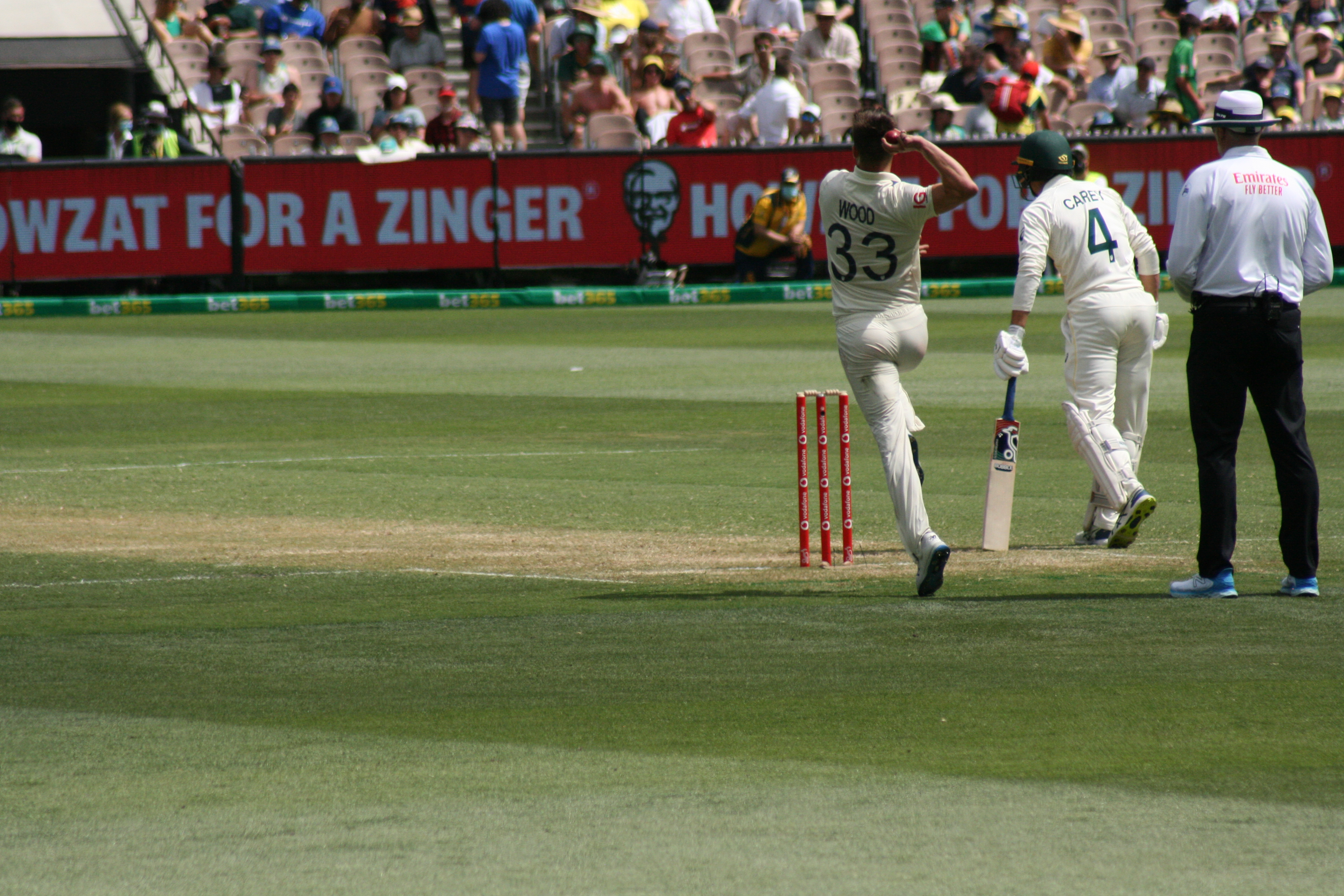
Bowler Mark Wood delivering over the wicket

Over the wicket
a right-arm bowler passing to the left of the non-striker's stumps in their run-up, and vice versa for a left-arm bowler. Compare with around the wicket.
Overarm
the action of bowling with the arm swinging from behind the body over the head, releasing the ball on the down swing without bending the elbow. This type of bowling is the only type normally allowed in all official cricket matches. Compare with underarm.
Overpitched delivery
a delivery that is full pitched but not a yorker, bouncing just in front of the batter. Considered a poor delivery, as it easy for the batter to get the middle of the bat to the ball. An overpitched ball is often a half-volley.
Overthrows
the scoring of extra runs due to an errant throw from a fielder. Also known as buzzers. Occasionally used erroneously for any runs scored after a fielder misfields the ball. Also refers to the throw itself as the ball goes far past or "over" the intended target.

== P ==
Pace bowling (also fast bowling)
a style of bowling in which the ball is delivered at high speeds, typically over 90 mph (145 km/h). A pace bowler (or paceman) often will also use swing.

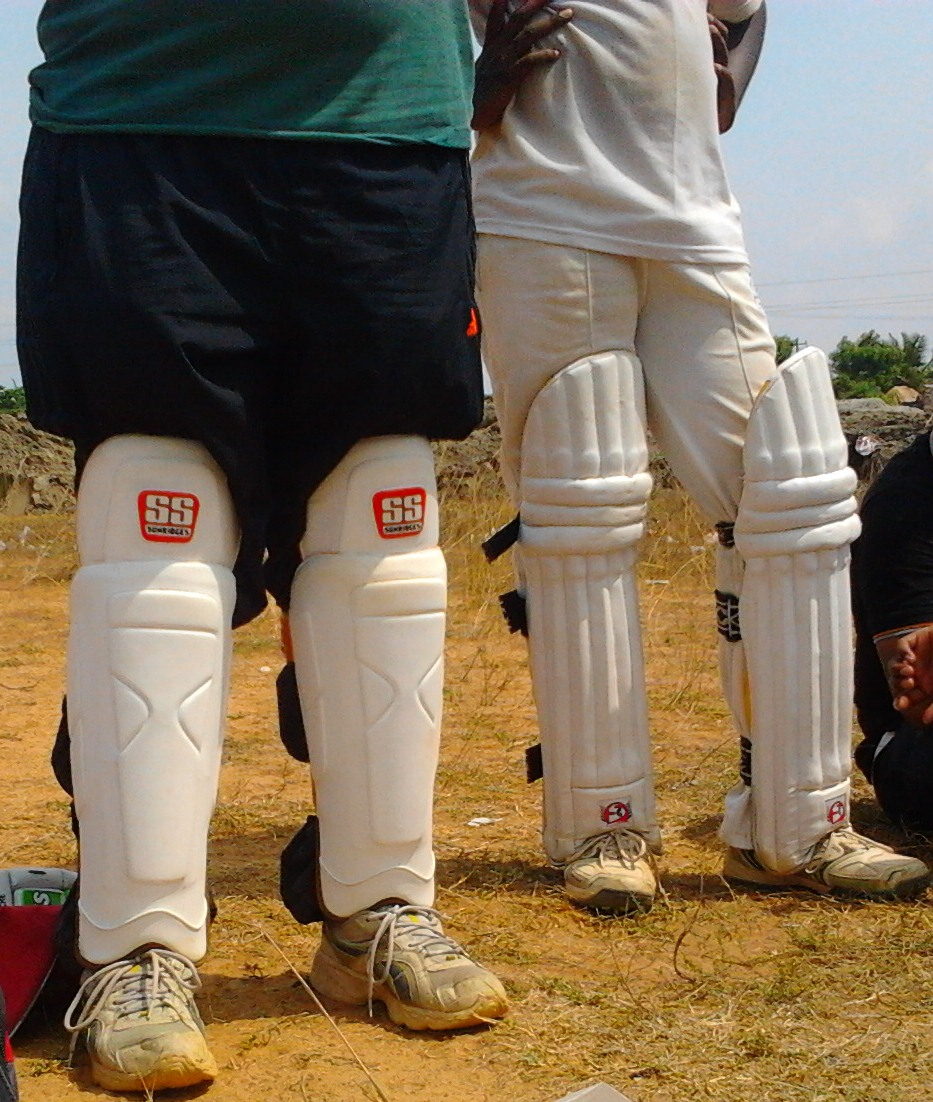
Pads used by a wicketkeeper (left) and a batter (right)

Pads
protective equipment for batters and wicket-keepers, covering the legs.
Pad away or pad-play
to intentionally use the pads deflect the ball away from the wicket. Using the pad instead of the bat removes the danger of being caught by close fielders, but would only be used when there is no risk of being dismissed LBW (for example, if the ball pitched on the leg side).
Paddle sweep
A very fine sweep, almost just a tickle of the delivery pitched on or outside leg stump.
Paddle scoop

A shot in which the batter drops on one knee and scoops the ball over their shoulder or head, using the bat as a ramp to redirect the momentum of the ball. Considered unorthodox and risky, but can result in a boundary behind the wicketkeeper or in the fine leg region.
Pair
a "pair of spectacles" (0–0) or a "pair of ducks". A batter's score of nought (zero) runs in both innings of a two-innings match (see this list of Pairs in test and first-class cricket).
Par score
during the second innings of a limited overs match, the par score is the target the Duckworth-Lewis method calculates if the match were to be halted now (e.g. due to rain). Updated after each ball, the par score can be used to judge whether the chasing team is ahead or behind the run rate and wickets they will probably require to win, which is of interest even in uninterrupted matches.
Partner
The other batter who is in. There is always one striker and one non-striker; the roles switch when an odd number of runs are scored or at the end of an over.
Partnership
the number of runs scored between a pair of batters before one of them gets dismissed. This also includes the deliveries faced and time taken.
Part-time bowler (or part-timer)
a specialist batter (or even a wicketkeeper) who is not known for bowling, but has adequate skills to occasionally bowl a few overs. Captains use part-timers to provide some variation in their attack, and to subject batters to bowlers they would not have prepared to face.
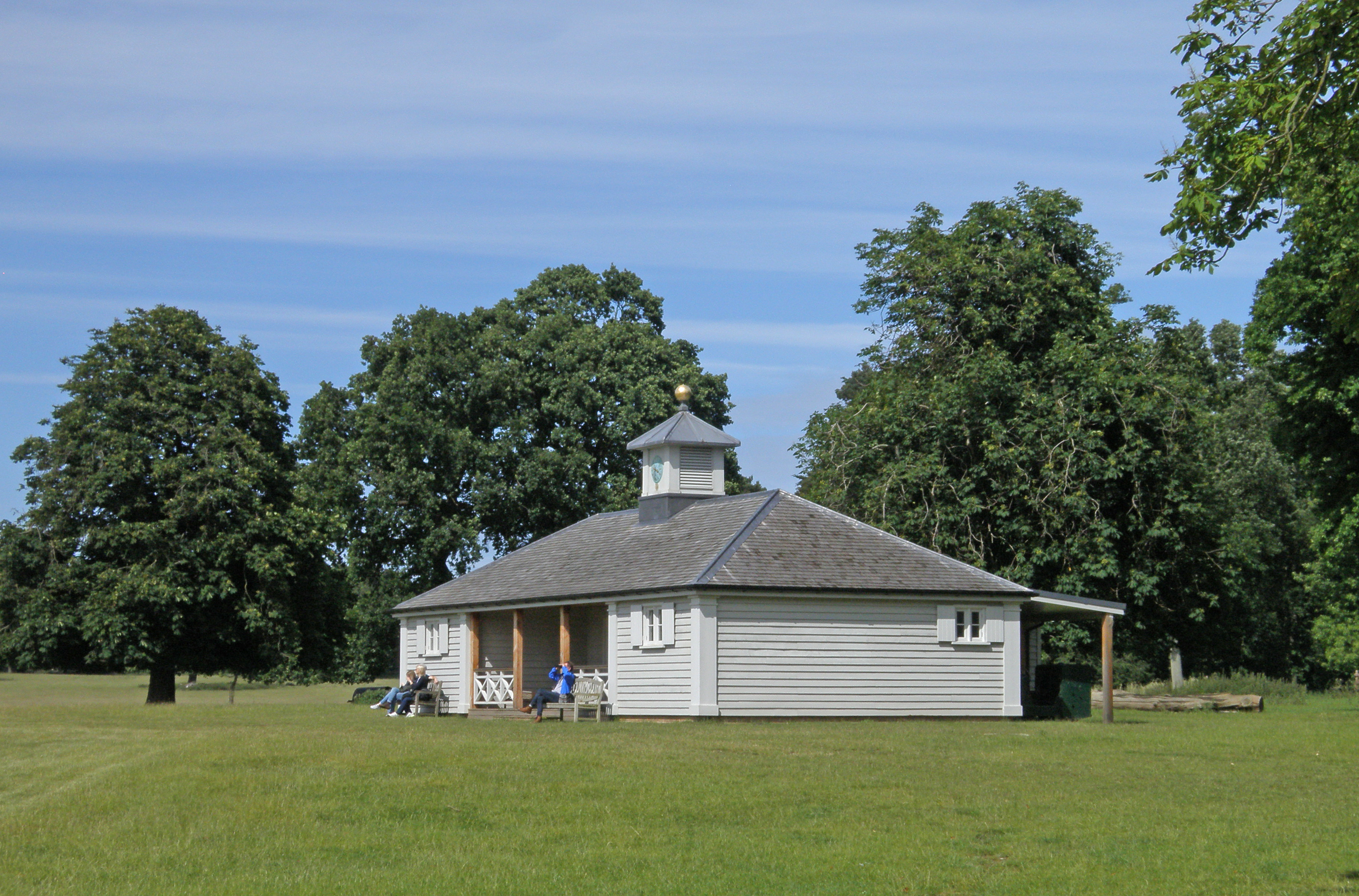
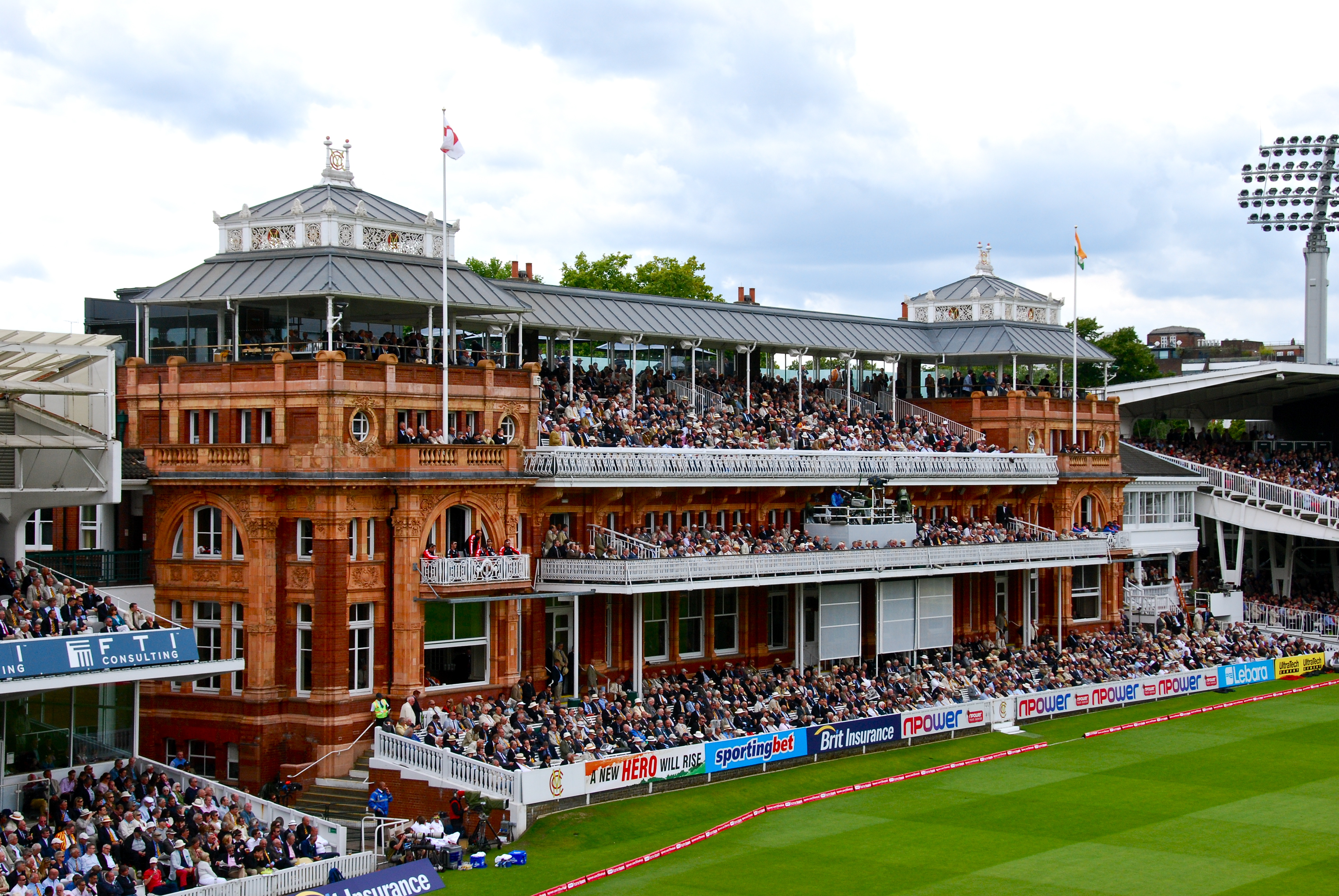
Two examples of cricket pavilions: a small pavilion used in club cricket, and the much larger Lord's Pavilion.
Pavilion
a building or grandstand that contains the player's dressing rooms, located adjacent to the field. At larger grounds, the pavilion usually incorporates seating (and other facilities) for members of the home club to watch the game.
Peach
a delivery bowled by a fast bowler considered unplayable, usually a really good delivery that a batter gets out to, or one that is too good that the batters cannot even edge.
Pea roller
A now illegal delivery where the ball is rolled along the ground rather than bowled over-arm.
Pegs
(slang) the stumps.
Perfume ball
a bouncer on or just outside off-stump that passes within inches of the batter's face. So called because the ball is close enough to the batter's face that they can supposedly smell it.
Pfeiffer
see five-wicket haul
Pick
Of a batter, to correctly identify which variation a bowler (often a spin bowler) has delivered.
Pick of the bowlers
the bowler who performed the best, whether over the course of an innings or a match.
Picket fences
an over in which one run is scored off each delivery. It looks like picket fences 111111, hence the name.
Pie Chucker (or Pie Thrower)
A poor bowler, usually of slow to medium pace whose deliveries are flighted so much as to appear similar to a pie in the air. Considered easy to score off by batters – see Buffet Bowling.
Pinch hitter/Slogger
a lower order batter promoted up the batting order to increase the run rate. The term, if not the precise sense, is borrowed from baseball.

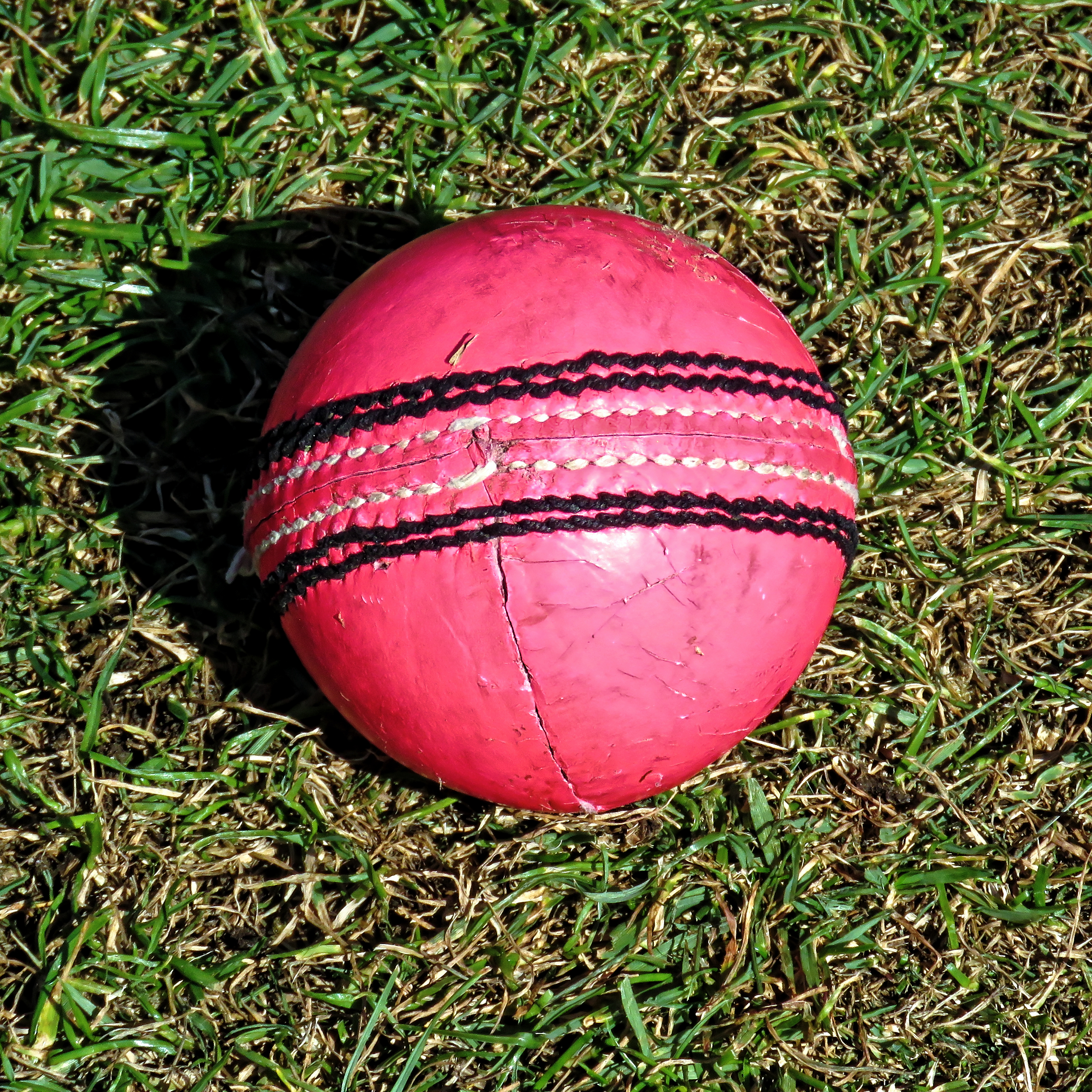
A pink ball

Pink ball
A type of ball that is intended to behave like a red ball but have the visibility of a white ball. Used exclusively in day/night timed matches. Its construction is identical to the red ball, except greater quantities of a fluorescent pink dye are used, and the seams are in black thread. Initially trialled in 2009, it was first used in a Test match in 2015. The properties of pink balls have been debated and continue to evolve as manufacturing techniques are adjusted.
Pitch
1. the rectangular surface in the centre of the field where most of the action takes place, usually made of earth or clay. It is 22 yards in length. Also known as the "deck", as used in the phrase "hit the deck", which is when a bowler makes the ball bounce more off the pitch.
2. of the ball, to bounce before reaching the batter after delivery.
3. the spot where the ball pitches (sense 2).
Pitch (It) Up
to bowl a delivery on a fuller length.
Pitch map
a diagram showing where a number of balls, usually from a particular bowler, have pitched. Compare beehive.
Placement
the ball when it is hit such that it bisects or trisects the fielders placed on the field. The ball usually ends up being a four.
Platinum duck
a player dismissed without even facing a ball – most likely by being run out as the non-striker. Also sometimes referred to as a Diamond Duck.
Play and miss
when a batter aims to hit the ball with the bat but does not make contact; a swing and a miss
Playing on
for the batter to hit the ball with their bat but only succeed in diverting it onto the stumps. The batter is thus out bowled. Also known as "dragging on" or "chopping on"
Playing time
the set of rules specifying when the match begins, which intervals or drinks breaks occur, how long play can continue etc. These vary widely depending on the type of match (a Twenty20 lasts less than 3 hours, whilst a Test match takes up to five days) and may be adjusted by prior agreement to account for local climate, the specific competition etc.
Plumb
of a dismissal by LBW: indisputable, obvious. Of a wicket, giving true bounce.
Point
A fielding position located square on the off side, in line with the popping crease and about halfway to the boundary.
Point of release
the position of the bowler at the moment when the ball is released.
Pongo
(used primarily by UK county players) a very high volume of run-making, or batting assault.
Popper
a ball that rises sharply from the pitch when bowled ('pops up').
Popping crease
One of two lines in the field defined as being four feet in front of and parallel to that end's bowling crease where the wickets are positioned. A batter who does not have either the bat or some part of their body touching the ground behind the popping crease is considered out of their ground and is in danger of being dismissed run out or stumped.
Powerplay
a block of overs that in One Day Internationals offer a temporary advantage to the batting side.
Pro20
South African form of Twenty20
Pro40
a professional limited overs competition that was played in England from 1969 to 2009, with 40 overs per side
Protected area
An area of the pitch defined as two feet wide down the middle of the pitch and beginning five feet from each popping crease. A bowler is not allowed to trespass this area in their follow-through or the bowler is given a warning. Three such warnings will immediately bar them from bowling for the rest of the innings.
Pull
a shot played to the leg side to a short-pitched delivery, between mid-wicket and backward square-leg.
Pursuit
Synonym of runchase.
Push
1. a call by a batter to their partner, a variant of yes. The meaning is the same, except both batters should put in extra effort and be ready to turn for additional run(s). May be followed by additional calls of no, two or three.
2. Can also refer to a bowler pushing the ball through, meaning they bowl it quicker (usually said of a spinner). See darting the ball in.
Put down
1. Put down the wicket 2. To put down (drop) a catch; often said with the batter as the object i.e. the fielder has put "him" down.

== Q ==
Quarter seam
a flush join between pieces of leather on the surface of the ball, running at right angles to the main stitched seam
Quick
Traditionally, a quick bowler was one who completed their over in a short space of time. In more recent years, it has been used as a synonym for a fast or pace bowler. (Paradoxically, a quick bowler in the traditional sense was often also a slow bowler, that is, a bowler who delivered slow deliveries. A fast or pace bowler was rarely also a quick bowler in the traditional sense, because they took a longer time to complete an over.)
Quick cricket
see kwik cricket
Quick single
When the two batters run very quickly between the wickets to score a run
Quota
In a limited overs match, the maximum number of overs that may be bowled by each bowler. Equal to the total number of overs in the innings divided by five (rounded up if necessary). For a One Day International the quota is 10 overs, while for a T20 match the quota is 4 overs.
Quotient (or runs per wicket ratio)
A quantity used as a league table tie-breaker in some first class tournaments. Defined as the number of runs scored per wicket lost when batting, divided by the number of runs conceded per wicket taken when bowling. The equivalent in limited overs tournaments is the net run rate.

== R ==
Ramp shot
see paddle scoop
Rabbit
1. A particularly poor batter, who is, invariably, a specialist bowler. While most lower-order batters would be expected to occasionally score some useful runs, a rabbit is expected to be dismissed cheaply almost every time. Another term, ferret, refers to a batter even worse than a rabbit. The term comes from hunting with ferrets where the hunter "sends in a ferret after the rabbits".
2. A higher order batter who is out frequently to the same bowler is referred to as that bowler's rabbit or bunny.
Rain delay
A halt in game proceedings due to rain, but not yet a wash out.
Rain rule
Any of various methods of determining which team wins a rain-shortened one-day match. The current preferred method is the Duckworth–Lewis method.

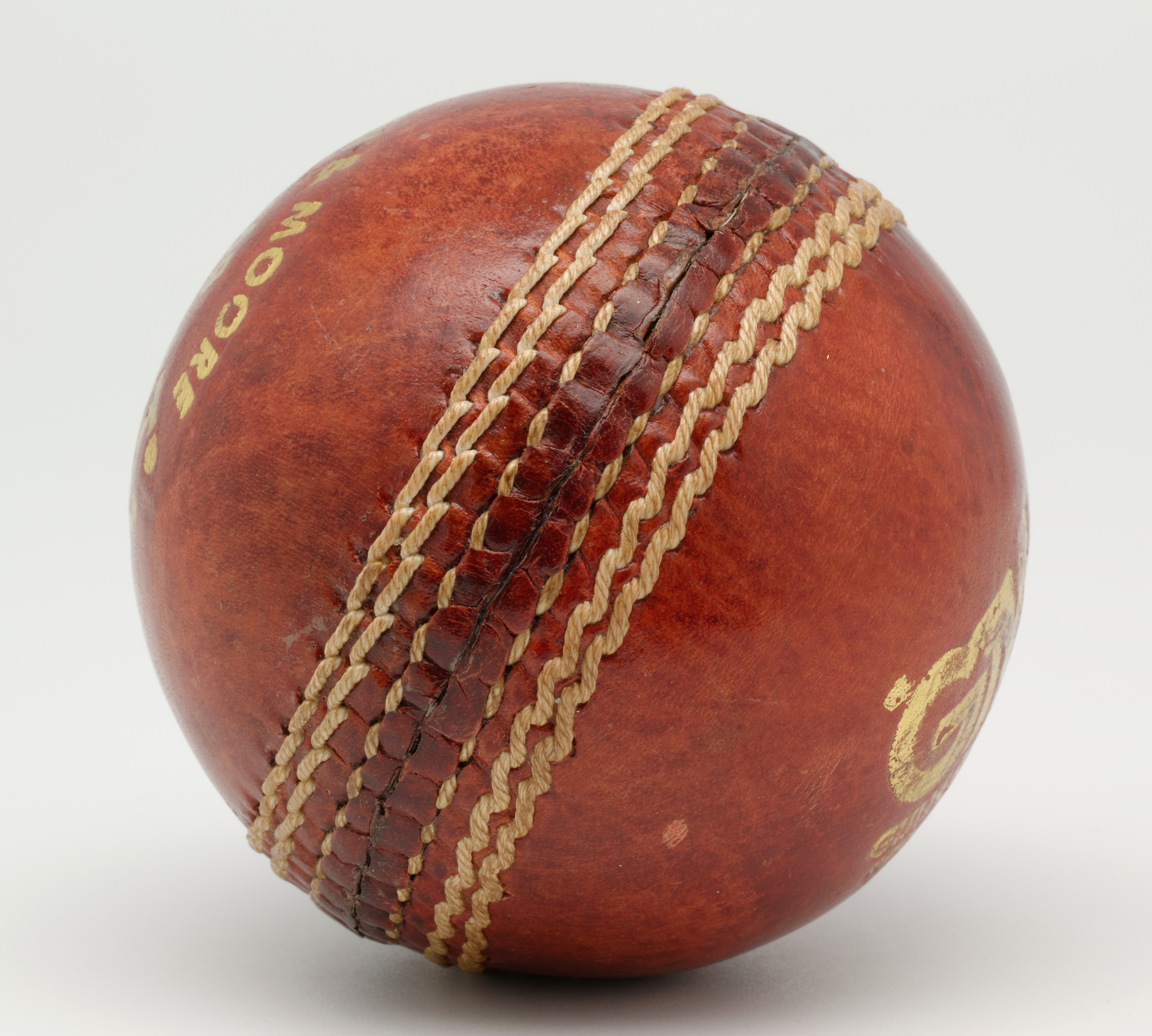
A red ball

Red ball
The traditional type of ball. Its surface is composed of leather protected by a thin layer of lacquer, both dyed red. Red balls are used in almost all timed matches and most amateur matches, during which the players wear whites. Red balls are not used in day/night matches, because the dark colour is difficult to see during twilight or under floodlights (a pink ball can be used instead). Compared to the white ball, red balls are harder wearing, being designed for at least 80 overs of continuous use. Red balls also tend to swing for longer than white balls.
Red cherry
see cherry
Referral

An invocation of the Umpire Decision Review System, referring the decision to the third umpire for review.
Release or point of release
The moment in a bowling action when the bowler lets go of the ball.
Required run rate

The run rate needed by the batting team to win, in the second innings of a limited overs match. Calculated as the number of runs required for victory (not a tie), divided by the number of overs remaining. Often shown on the scoreboard and updated automatically after each delivery. A high required run rate necessitates more aggressive batting.
Reserve day
A vacant day in a touring schedule which can be used to replay or reconvene a match which is washed out. Mostly seen in the latter stages of major limited-overs tournaments.
Rest day
A non-playing day in the middle of a multiple day game. These were once common, but are seldom seen in the modern era.
Result
The final outcome of a match. Possible results are a win/loss, a draw, or a tie. Alternatively, rain delays may lead to an outcome of no result, or a wash out may lead to the match being abandoned before it begins.
Retire
for a batter to voluntarily leave the field during their innings, usually because of injury. A player who retires through injury/illness ("retired hurt/ill") may return in the same innings at the fall of a wicket, and continue where they left off. A player who is uninjured ("retired out") may return only with the opposing captain's consent.
Reverse sweep
a right-handed batter sweeping the ball like a left-handed batter and vice versa.
Reverse swing
the art of swinging the ball contrary to how a conventionally swung ball moves in the air; i.e. movement away from the rough side. Many theories as to how this may occur. Usually happens with an older ball than conventional swing, but not always, atmospheric conditions and bowler skill also being important factors. It has been espoused that once the 'rough' side becomes extremely rough a similar effect to that of a dimpled golf ball may cause it to move more quickly through the air than the 'shiny' side of the ball. Invented by Pakistani fast bowler Sarfaraz Nawaz and later perfected by the likes of Imran Khan, Wasim Akram and Waqar Younis.
Review
see referral
Rib tickler
A ball bowled short of a length that bounces up higher than expected and strikes the batter in the midriff (usually the side) and hits several ribs.
Right arm
a bowler who bowls the ball with their right hand is, by convention, called a 'right-arm' or 'right arm' bowler (rather than 'right hand' or 'right-handed'). (Contrast "right hand batter".)
Right hand
a batter who bats right-handed is a 'right hand' bat. (Contrast "right arm bowler".)
Ring field
A field which is set primarily to save singles, consisting of fieldsmen in all or most of the primary positions forward of the wicket, on or about the fielding circle (or where it would be).
Road
A very hard and flat pitch, good for batting on. Synonyms such as street, highway, etc. may sometimes be used in the same context.
Rogers
The second XI of a club or county. From the Warwickshire and New Zealand player Roger Twose.

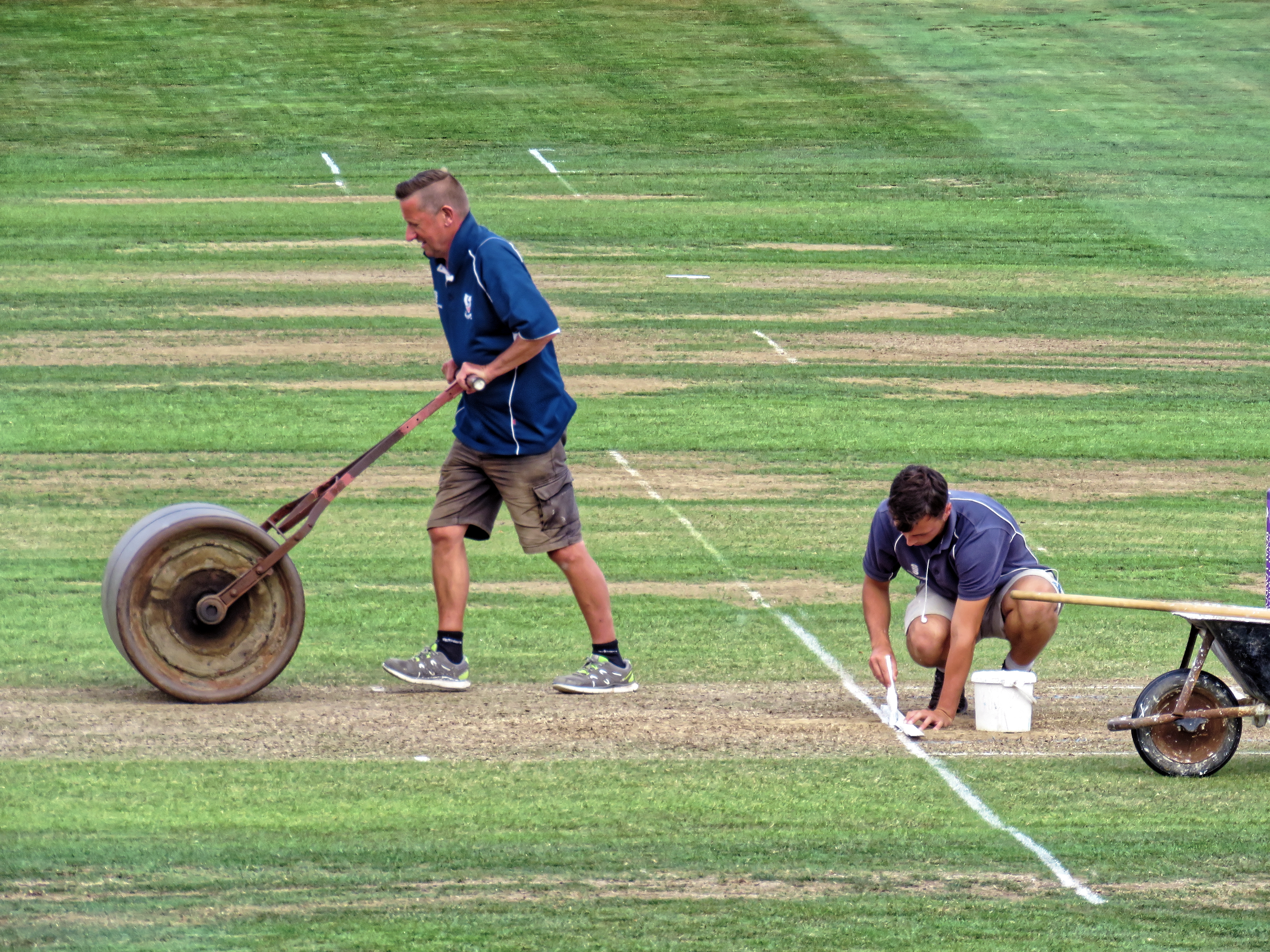
A groundsman applies a roller to the pitch, while another paints the popping crease

Roller
A cylindrical implement used to flatten the pitch before play or between sessions. Usually there are two rollers available, a heavy roller and a light roller, with the choice of which to use being given to the captain of the batting side.
Rotate the strike
to look to make singles wherever possible, in order to ensure that both batters are continually facing deliveries and making runs. The opposite of farming the strike.
Rough
a worn-down section of the pitch, often due to bowlers' footmarks, from which spinners are able to obtain more turn.
Round the wicket
see around the wicket
Roundarm bowling
the type of bowling action in which the bowler's outstretched arm is perpendicular to their body when they release the ball. Round arm bowling is legal in cricket.
Royal Duck
a dismissal for nought (zero), from the first ball faced in the game.
Run
The basic unit of scoring: the team with the most runs wins the match (with rare exceptions if a rain rule is required). The two batters can score a run by both running from one end of the pitch to the other, grounding their bat or foot beyond the popping crease, before the fielding team can recover the ball and return it for a run out. This usually requires the striker to play a shot, directing the ball away from the fielders, in which case the run is credited to the striker. Multiple runs can be scored from a single delivery, or by hitting a boundary (either a four or a six). The batting team (but not an individual batter) is credited with one or more runs if there are extras or penalty runs.
Run chase
The act/task of the team batting second (in a limited-overs match) or batting fourth (in an unlimited overs match), trying to win a match by batting and surpassing the runs accumulated by the opponent.
Run out
dismissal by a member of the fielding side breaking the wicket while the batter is outside their crease making a run.
Run rate
the average number of runs scored per over.
Run up
see approach.
Runner
a player from the batting side who assists an injured batter by running between the wickets. The runner wears and carry the same equipment, and can be run out. Since 2011, runners have not been permitted in international cricket, but can be used at lower grades.
Runs per wicket ratio
See quotient.
Runscorer or run scorer
a batter who is prolific at scoring runs, particularly if they hold a record for doing so.

== S ==
Safe
The batters are safe when in their ground, or starting from a position between the popping creases it have made their ground before a fielder can break the wicket.
Sandshoe crusher
See toe crusher
Sawn off
A batter who has been wrongly or unluckily given out by an umpire.
Scoop shot
see paddle scoop
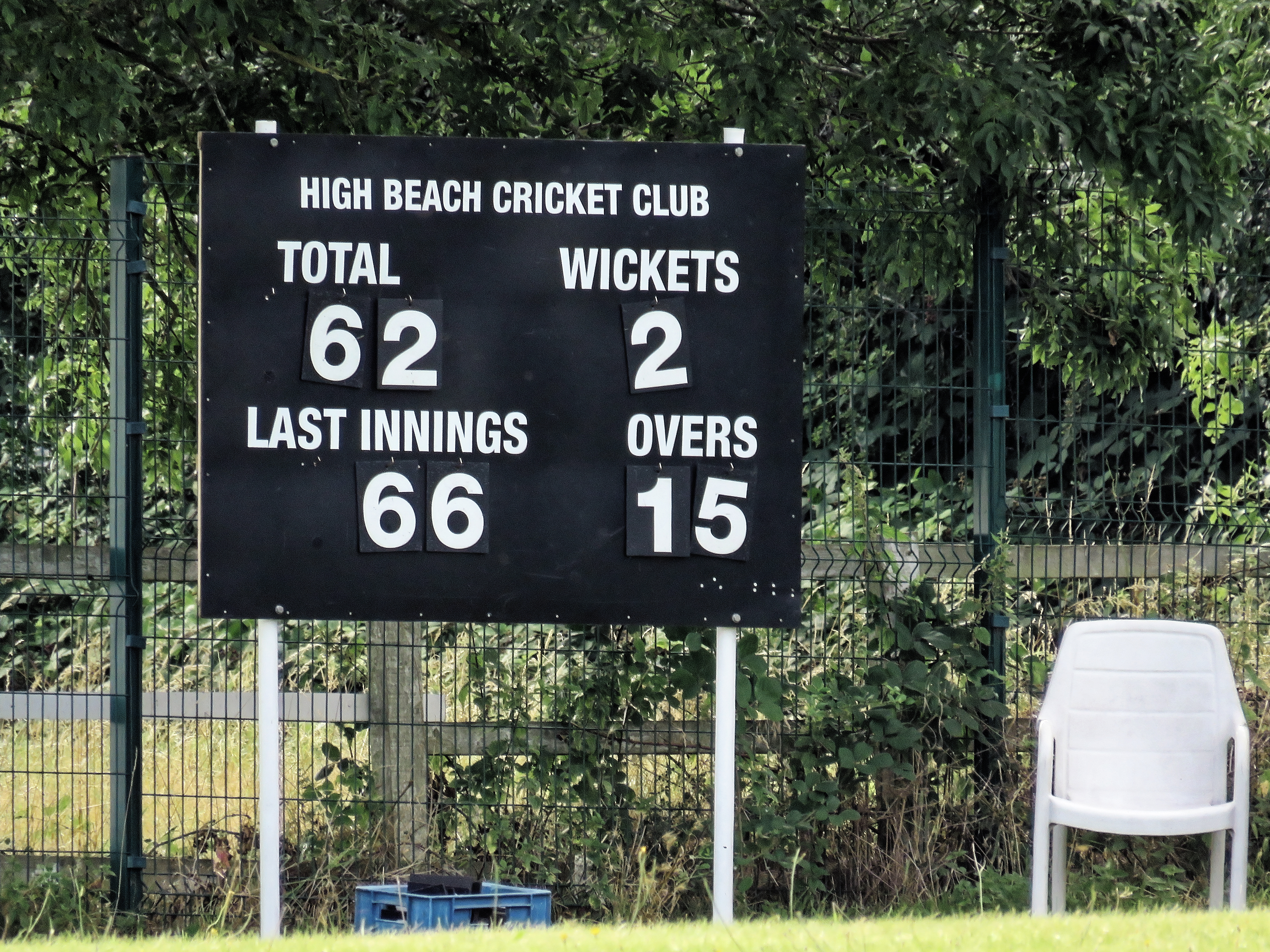
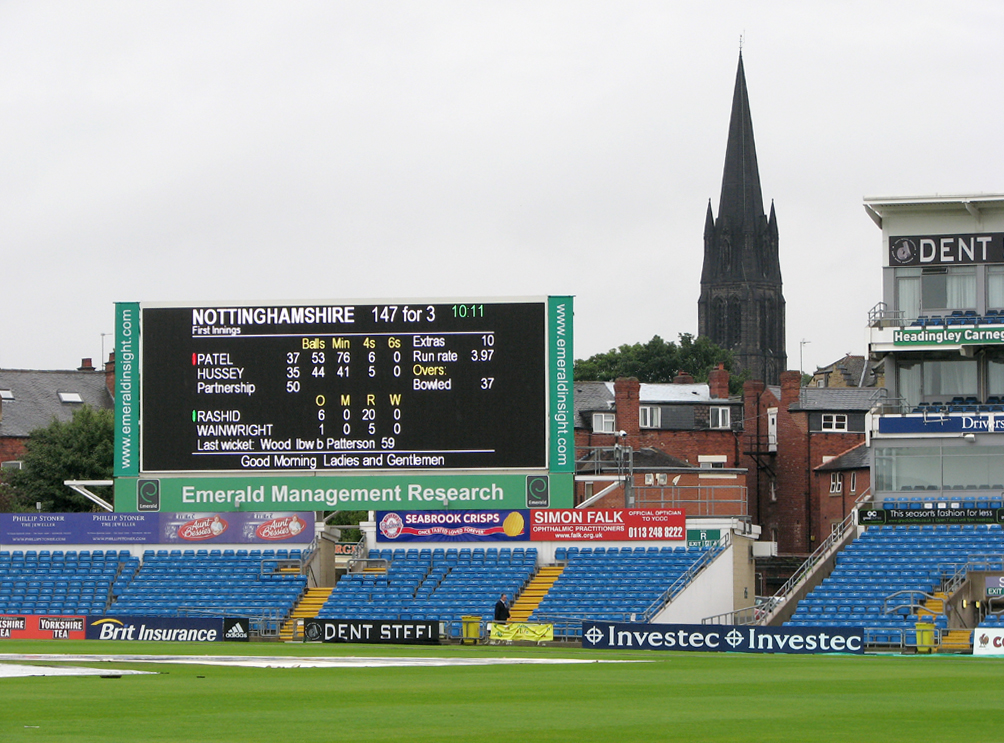
Two examples of scoreboards: a simple hand-operated scoreboard used in club cricket, and a large electronic scoreboard at Headingley Cricket Ground.
Scoreboard
A large mechanical or electronic display that indicates the current score, controlled by the scorer. A basic scoreboard lists the number of runs scored, wickets taken, overs completed, and (in the second innings of a limited overs match) the target required. More sophisticated scoreboards provide far more information, such as individual scores for each batter, the bowling analysis, required run rate, par score etc.
Scorer
A person officially responsible for recording the scoring and detailed statistics of the game, usually ball-by-ball.
Scramble seam
a variation employed in seam bowling where the bowler makes the plane of the ball's seam tumble, rather than stable at a narrow angle to the direction of the delivery (seam up), or nearly perpendicular to the direction of the delivery (cross-seam). The hope is that the ball will bounce unpredictably depending on whether the ball's seam contacts the ground.
Seam
1. (noun) the raised stitching running around the circumference of the ball.
2. (verb) for a ball to deviate off the pitch because it has bounced on its seam.
Seam bowling
a bowling style which uses the uneven conditions of the ball – specifically the raised seam – to make it deviate upon bouncing off the pitch. Contrast with swing bowling.
Seamer
a seam bowler
Season
the period of each year when cricket is played. Varies substantially between countries.
Selector
a person who is delegated with the task of choosing players for a cricket team. Typically, the term is used in the context of player selection for national, provincial and other representative teams at the professional levels of the game, where a "panel of selectors" acts under the authority of the relevant national or provincial cricket administrative body.
SENA
The countries South Africa, England, New Zealand and Australia, deemed to have unique pitch conditions. Also sometimes "SANE countries".
Sent in
a team which bats first after losing the toss is said to have been "sent in" by the opposing captain.
Series
A set of matches played a few days apart between the same two teams in the same format, but usually at different locations. An international tour often includes a Test series, an ODI series and a T20 series, each of between two and five matches.
Session
A period of play, from start to lunch, lunch to tea and tea until stumps.
Shelled a Dolly
dropped a really easy catch (Dolly).
Shepherd the strike (also farm the strike)
of a batter, contrive to receive the majority of the balls bowled, often to protect a weaker batting partner. Typically, involves declining taking singles early in overs, and trying to take singles late in overs.
Shooter
a delivery that skids after pitching (i.e. does not bounce as high as would be expected), usually at a quicker pace, resulting in a batter unable to hit the ball cleanly.
Short
1. (of a fielding position) close to the batter, but not so close as silly; the opposite of deep.
2. (of a delivery) see short-pitched.
Short-pitched
a delivery that bounces relatively close to the bowler. The intent is to make the ball bounce well above waist height (a bouncer). A slow or low-bouncing short-pitched ball is known as a long hop.
Short of a length
describes a short-pitched delivery that is not so short as a bouncer.
Short run
a would-be run that does not count because, when turning for an additional run, one of the batters failed to ground some part of their body or bat behind the popping crease.
Shot
the act of the batter hitting the ball with their bat.
Shot selection
The choice by the batter of which shot (or leave) to attempt against each delivery. A major part of batting tactics, there are many factors that influence this decision.
Short Stop
When the wicket keeper stands upfront, the fielder placed right behind the wicket keeper is called a Short Stop. When the fielder stands outside the 30-yard circle, he is called a Long Stop.
Shoulder Arms
Rather than risk playing the ball, the batter lifts the bat high above their shoulder to keep their bat and hand out of harm's way.
Side on
1. A side on bowler has back foot, chest and hips aligned towards the batter at the instant of back foot contact.
2. A batter is side on if their hips and shoulders are facing at ninety degrees to the bowler.

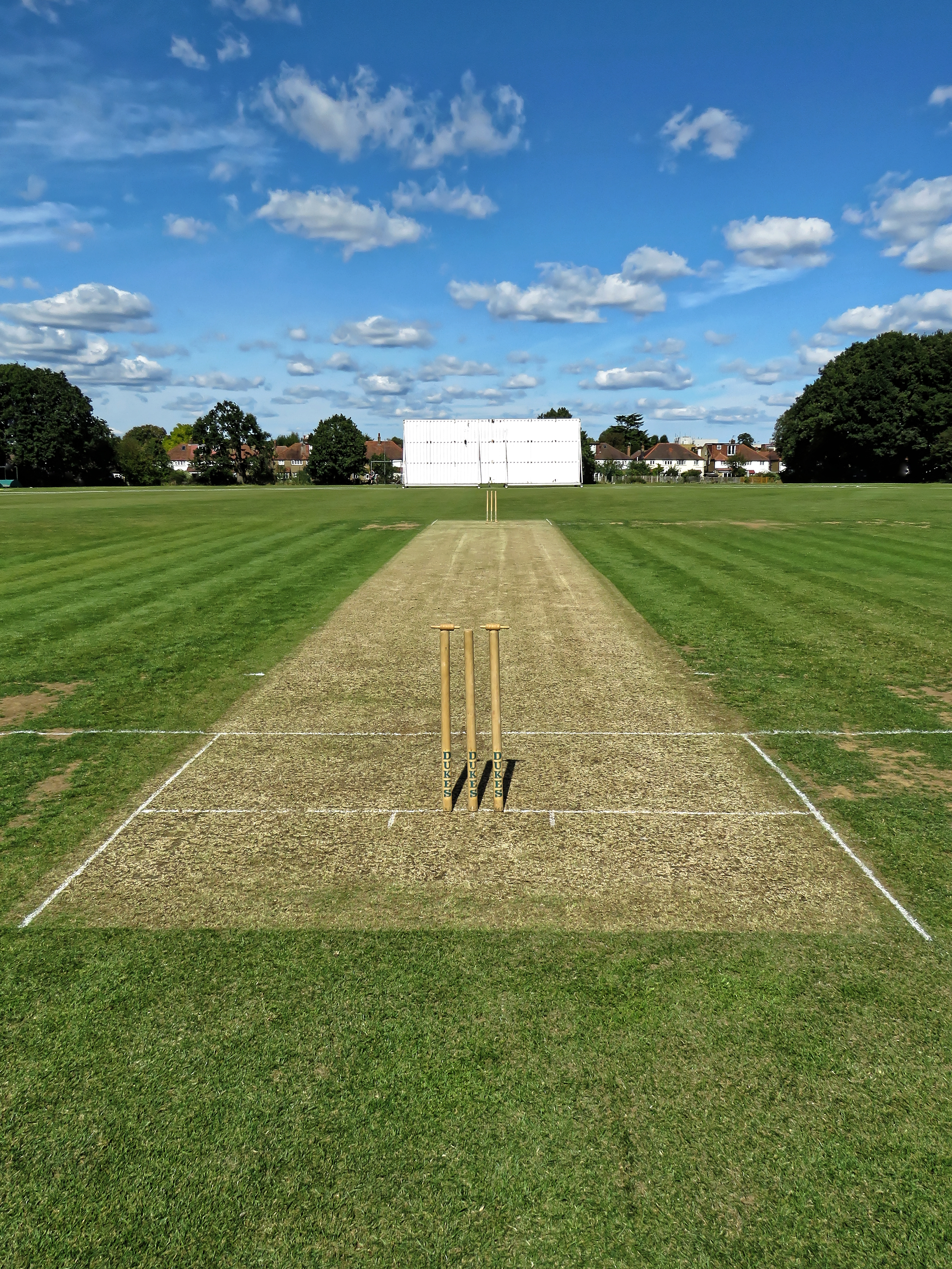
View along a pitch showing the sight screen, which provides a plain white background behind the bowler, to help the batter see a red ball

Sight screen
a large board placed behind the bowler, beyond the boundary, used to provide contrast to the ball, thereby aiding the striker in seeing the ball when it is delivered. Typically, coloured white to contrast a red ball, or black to contrast a white ball.
Signal
a standardised set of body motions used by the umpire to indicate decisions to the players and the scorer. Most signals utilise only the position or motion of the arm, but some also involve legs or fingers. For example, tapping one thigh while lifting that foot off the ground indicates leg byes, or holding one arm directly upwards while extending a single finger means out.
Silly
a modifier to the names of some fielding positions to denote that they are unusually close to the batter, most often silly mid-off, silly mid-on, silly midwicket and silly point.
Single
a run scored by the batters physically running once only between the wickets.
Single wicket
A one-vs-one version of cricket, in which the two competitors bat and bowl against each other, while neutral participants field for both. Each inning consists of a single wicket and a limited number of overs (usually two or three). Currently only played informally and rarely seen, the format was once highly popular and played professionally, particularly from 1750 to 1850.
Sitter
a very easy catch. A fielder who misses such a catch is said to have 'dropped a sitter'.
Six (or Sixer)
a shot which passes over or touches the boundary without having bounced or rolled, so called because it scores six runs to the batting side.
Skiddy
A pace bowler who typically obtains a low-bounce on their delivery is described as skiddy. The opposite is slingy
Skier

A mistimed shot hit almost straight up in the air, to the sky. Usually results in the batter being caught out. Occasionally however the fielder positions themself perfectly to take the catch but misses it or drops it. Such an error is considered very embarrassing for the fielder.
Skipper
An informal term for the captain, from the nautical skipper. Sometimes shortened to 'skip', particularly as a nickname.
Skyline
alternative name for Manhattan.
Slash
a cut, but played aggressively or possibly recklessly – a cut (q.v.) being a shot played square on the off side to a short-pitched delivery wide of off stump. So called because the batter makes a "cutting" motion as they play the shot.
Sledging
verbal exchanges between players on opposing sides. This ranges from banter between friends to verbal abuse or a psychological tactic to gain advantage of the opposition by undermining their confidence or breaking their concentration. Considered in some cricketing countries to be against the spirit of the game, but acceptable in others.
Slice
a kind of cut shot played with the bat making an obtuse angle with the batter.
Slider
a wrist spinner's delivery where backspin is put on the ball.
Slingy
A pace bowler who typically obtains a high-bounce on their delivery, perhaps because of their unusual height. The opposite is skiddy
Slip
a close fielder positioned behind the batter, close to the wicket-keeper on the off-side. Also ("in the slips", "at first slip") the positions occupied by such fielders. Commonly there will be two or three slips in an attacking field (although there is no limit and a captain may use more), and one or none in a defensive field.
Slip catching cradle
a large piece of training equipment, used for practising the quick-reaction catches needed by a fielder in the slips.
Slips cordon
See cordon
Slog
a powerful shot, in which the batter hits the ball high and long in an attempt to reach the boundary. Regarded as a risky shot, it will often result in a six or a four, but also has a high chance of getting out. Used by batters with more strength than skill, or who need to score runs quickly (see death overs).
Slog overs
see death overs.
Slog sweep
a type of slog in which a sweep shot hit hard and in the air, over the same boundary as for a hook. Used exclusively against spin bowlers.
Slower ball
a medium-pace delivery bowled by a fast bowler. Designed to deceive the batter into playing the ball too early and skying it to a fielder. Has several variations.
Slow left armer
a left-arm, orthodox, finger spin bowler; the left-handed equivalent of an off spinner (see off spin).
Snick
See edge
Snickometer
a television graphic, also available for use by the third umpire, used to assess on a replay whether the batter has snicked the ball. The graphic juxtaposes a slow motion replay with a sound oscilloscope, and is used to assess whether a sharp sound was recorded at the same moment as the ball passes the bat. Sometimes shortened to snicko.
Soft hands (batting) (also soft bat)
To bat with soft hands (or play with a soft bat) is to hold the bat loosely or with relaxed hands so that it absorbs the ball's momentum, meaning that the ball does not rebound sharply off it when the shot is played.
Soft hands (fielding)
To catch the ball with soft hands is to relax the hands and follow through the motion of the ball in the air, allowing the ball to hit the hands gently rather than risking it bouncing out of the hands.
Specialist
a player selected in the team primarily for a single skill, i.e. not an all-rounder or a wicket-keeper-batter. Such players can be referred to as specialist batters, specialist bowlers, or specialist wicketkeepers.
Spectacles
another word for a pair. From the appearance of two ducks on the scorecard as 0–0.
Spell
1. the number of continuous overs a bowler bowls before being relieved.
Spider Graph (also Wagon Wheel)
a graphical chart that represents the trajectory of the ball from each scoring stroke, including its direction, distance travelled, and (where the technology allows) elevation and bounces. Each scoring stroke is represented by a coloured line, typically colour-coded by the number of runs from the stroke. The Spider Graph is a more detailed version of the traditional Wagon Wheel graphic; some commentators use the two terms interchangeably, while others use Wagon Wheel only for the less-detailed version.
Spin bowling
a style of bowling in which a spin bowler ("spinner") attempts to deceive the batter by imparting spin on the ball using either their fingers or their wrist. Spin bowling is most effective when the ball is travelling relatively slowly, and so most spinners bowl at a pace between 40 and 55 mph.
Spirit of cricket (or spirit of the game)
A nebulous concept of good conduct, encompassing fair play, sportsmanship, mutual respect and acceptance of the umpires' decisions. Considered an integral part of the sport. Since 2000 a preamble to the Laws of cricket instructs all participants to act within the spirit of cricket.
Splice
the joint between the handle and the blade of a bat; the weakest part of the bat. If the ball hits the splice it is likely to dolly up for an easy catch.
Square
1. of a position on the field, perpendicular to the line of the pitch; the opposite of fine.
2. the area in the middle of the ground where the pitches are prepared.
3. an imaginary line extending the crease to the boundary on the leg side; it is illegal to have more than two fielders behind square.
Square leg
1. a fielding position on the on side approximately at right angles to the batter
2. a person who fields at that position
Square-cut
A cut shot, played square, i.e. perpendicular to the bowler's delivery.
Stance (also batting stance)
the posture of a batter holding their bat when facing a delivery.
Stand (noun)
A synonym for partnership.
Standing up
position adopted by a Wicket-keeper, close to the stumps, when a slow (or, occasionally, medium pace) bowler is operating.
Start
a batter is said to have a start when they successfully avoid being dismissed for very few runs; in Australia, this is generally understood to mean a score of twenty runs. Once a batter survives this initial period and becomes established, batting generally becomes easier as they have settled into a rhythm and have adapted to the playing conditions and are less vulnerable, so they are then expected to convert their starts into big scores.
Steaming in
a bowler taking a fast run-up to bowl is said to be steaming in.
Sticky dog
a drying wicket that is exceedingly difficult to bat on. Uncommon if not non-existent in recent years due to the routine covering of pitches.
Sticky wicket
a difficult wet pitch.
Stock ball
See stock delivery
Stock bowler
a bowler whose role is to restrict scoring rather than to take wickets. Usually called upon to bowl numerous overs at a miserly run rate while strike bowlers rest between spells or attempt to take wickets from the other end.
Stock delivery or stock ball)
A bowler's standard type of delivery; the one they bowl most frequently. Bowlers usually have a single stock delivery and one or more variations.
Stodger
a batter who makes it their job to defend and to score at a mediocre rate. This style is prone to derogatory comments but also compliments on resilience and technique.
Stonewaller
An extreme example of a blocker.
Straight
Close to the imaginary line between the two sets of stumps (cf. wicket-to-wicket). Used as an adjective, to indicate the direction of a shot, as a modifier to a fielding position, or to describe the line of a delivery.
Straight bat
the bat when held vertically, or when swung through a vertical arc
Straight up-and-down
pejorative term for a fast- or medium-paced bowler who cannot swing or seam the ball.
Stranded
a batter is said to be stranded on their score if they narrowly miss scoring a century or similar milestone because their team's innings ends, rather than because they were dismissed.
Strangled
a form of dismissal whereby a batter, in trying to play a glance very fine to a leg-side ball, gets an inside edge which is caught by the wicket-keeper.
Street
a pitch which is easy for batters and difficult for bowlers. Sometimes called a road, highway, and various other synonyms for street.
Strike
see on strike
Strike bowler
an attacking bowler whose role is to take wickets rather than to restrict scoring. Usually a fast bowler or attacking spinner who bowls in short spells to attacking field settings.
Strike rate
1. (batting) a percentage equal to the number of runs scored by a batter divided by the number of balls faced.
2. (bowling) the average number of deliveries bowled before a bowler takes a wicket.
Striker
The batter who is facing the current delivery. The striker may attempt a shot, score runs, or suffer any method of dismissal. Their partner is the non-striker, who is located at the other end of the pitch.
Stroke
an attempt by the batter to play at a delivery.
Stump
one of the three vertical posts making up the wicket. Starting from the off side, they are 'off stump', 'middle stump' and 'leg stump'.
Stumped

a method of dismissing a batter, in which the wicketkeeper breaks the batter's wicket with the ball while the batter is outside their crease but has not attempted a run
Stumps
1. the plural of stump
2. in a timed match lasting more than one day, the end of a day's play if the match is not yet complete. For example, 'at stumps, Team A were leading by...'. See also draw stumps.
Stump-cam
A small television camera inside middle stump to provide images of play close to the stumps, particularly when a batter is bowled out.
Substitute
a player able to replace another on the fielding side. A substitute fielder may carry out normal fielding duties but is not allowed to bat, bowl or keep wicket.
Sun ball
A method of bowling where the ball is intentionally bowled at a great height and a sluggish pace. This is done to interrupt the batter's field of vision using the sun's rays, often causing disastrous consequences such as blunt strikes to the head.
Sundry
see extra
Supersub
Under experimental One-Day International rules played between July 2005 and February 2006, the supersub was a substitute player able to come on and replace any player at any point during the game, with the substitute able to take over the substituted player's batting and bowling duties – as distinct from a traditional substitute, who can field but is not permitted to bat, bowl or keep wicket.
Super Over
A method for breaking a tie used in some limited overs matches. Each team plays one more over with nominated batters (who may already have been dismissed in the main game), or until two wickets have been lost. The team that scores the most runs in their super over wins. The rules vary between competitions if the scores are still tied after the super over, but most commonly a boundary count is used.
Surrey Cut
see French Cut
Sweep
a shot played to a good length slow delivery. The batter gets down on one knee and "sweeps" the ball to the leg side.
Sweet spot
the small area on the face of the bat that gives maximum power for minimum effort when the ball is hit with it. Also known as the "middle" or "meat" of the bat. A shot that is struck with the sweet spot is referred to as being "well timed" (see timing).
Swerve
less common term for the drift used by spin bowlers
Swing
a bowling style usually employed by fast and medium-pace bowlers. The fielding side will polish the ball on one side of the seam only; as the innings continues, the ball will become worn on one side, but shiny on the other. When the ball is bowled with the seam upright, the air will travel faster over the shiny side than the worn side. This makes the ball swing (curve) in the air. Conventional swing would mean that the ball curves in the air away from the shiny side. (see also reverse swing).
Swish
a rapid or careless attacking stroke by the batter.
Switch hit
a shot played by a batter who reverses both their stance and their grip during the bowler's run-up, so that a right-handed batter would play the shot as an orthodox left-hander. The shot was popularised by England batter Kevin Pietersen, prompting some discussion about its impact on the rules, e.g. for lbw decisions in which it is necessary to distinguish between off and leg stumps.

== T ==
Tail
common colloquialism for the lower order of a batting line-up. If the tail wags it means the lower order has scored significantly well, perhaps enough to salvage a win. A "long tail" is a batting lineup which contains more bowlers than usual, and is considered weaker than normal.
Tail-ender
a player who bats towards the end of the batting order, usually a specialist bowler or wicket-keeper with relatively poor batting skills.
Tampering
scratching, scuffing, or otherwise unnaturally altering the cricket ball outside of its normal wear and tear. When this is done, it is usually by the fielding team, to give their bowler an edge so that the ball might spin or seam more effectively. This is an illegal act in the game.
Tape ball
An ersatz cricket ball produced by wrapping a tennis ball in electrical tape. Common in informal games on the Indian subcontinent.
Target
The score that the team batting last has to score to beat their opponents. This is one run more than what the team batting first managed; or, in limited overs cricket, an adjusted value determined by a rain rule.
Tea
the second of the two intervals during a full day's play is known as the tea interval, due to its timing at about tea-time. In matches lasting only an afternoon, the tea interval is usually taken between innings.
Teesra
A back spin delivery by a finger spin bowler.
Ten-wicket match
A two-innings match in which a bowler takes ten or more wickets in total.
Test cricket (also Test match)
The highest level of the sport. Consists of timed matches that last up to five days, with two innings per side. Played between senior international teams which have been granted Test status.
Textbook shot
A shot played by the batters with perfect orthodox technique, exactly as shown in textbooks on batting.
Three
1. a delivery from which the batter scored three runs.
2. a call by a batter to their partner, indicating that three runs should be attempted. Usually a follow-up after push or two, typically during the second turn.
Third man
position behind the wicket-keeper on the off-side, beyond the slip and gully areas
Third umpire
an off-field umpire, equipped with a television monitor, whose assistance the two on-field umpires can seek when in doubt.
Through the gate
The ball passing the batter in the gap between their bat and pads. A well-executed forward defence leaves no such gap ('shuts the gate'), so if a delivery passes 'through the gate' it indicates poor shot selection or defensive technique by the batter, which may result in being out bowled.
Throwing
of a bowler, an illegal bowling action in which the arm is straightened during the delivery. Also known as chucking
Tice
Obsolete term for a yorker, used in the nineteenth and early twentieth centuries.
Tickle
An edge to the wicket-keeper or slips. Alternatively a delicate shot usually played to third man or fine leg.
Tie
The result if both teams' scores are exactly equal when the match ends, either because the team batting last is all out (in a timed match) or the allotted overs have been played (in a limited overs match). Not to be confused with a draw, in which neither team wins but the scores are not equal. Ties are extremely rare; there have only been two Tied Tests in >2500 Test matches.
Tied down
A batter or batting team having their run-making restricted by the bowling side.
Timber
the (wooden) stumps. Achieving a Bowled dismissal is to have "hit the timber", or simply "Timber!".
Timed match
a match whose duration is based on a set amount of time rather than a set number of overs. Timed matches usually have a draw as a potential result, in addition to the win/loss or tie that can be achieved in limited overs cricket. All first-class cricket is currently played under a timed format.
Timed out
A batter is ruled timed out following the fall of a wicket if they do not occupy the crease within a set time. The new batter is then out just as if they had been bowled, stumped, run out or caught.
Timeless match
A historical match played without a limit on time (timed match) or overs (limited overs match). The timeless format allowed both teams to complete their full allotted innings, regardless of how many days play were required. In principle this avoided a potential draw, though in practice some timeless matches were drawn by agreement of the captains because they took too long. Many early first-class matches were timeless, but their unpredictable schedule and excessive length led to the format being abandoned in the 20th century. At international level, the last Timeless Test was in 1939.
Timing
the art of striking the ball so that it hits the bat's sweet spot. A "well-timed" shot imparts great speed to the ball but appears effortless.
Toblerone
Lengths of soft sponge, usually printed with advertising, that can be placed over the boundary rope. When in use, the toblerone counts as part of the rope e.g. for determining whether a boundary has been scored. So-called because its triangular prism shape is similar to that of Toblerone chocolate.
Toe end
The narrow side of the bat, the furthest part away from the handle.
Toe-crusher
A yorker bowled with inswing, aimed at the batter's toes.
Ton
Informal term for a century.
Top edge
See edge.
Top order
the batters batting in the top 4 in the batting order. These are generally the most skilled batters in the team, equipped with the technique and temperament to continue batting for long periods, often for hours or a whole day.
Top spin
forward rotation on the ball, causing it to increase speed immediately after pitching.
Toss
the traditional flipping of a coin to determine which captain will have the right to choose whether to bat or field.
Tour
An organised itinerary of matches requiring travel away from the team's usual base. Used especially in international cricket for the representative team of one nation playing a series of matches in another nation.
Tour match
any match on a tour which does not have full international status; most typically matches played as a warm-up between the travelling international team and a local club or composite team.
Track
another term for the pitch.
Trapped (in front)
Dismissed leg before wicket
Triggered
when the umpire gives a batter out LBW almost immediately with little consideration for any other factor than the ball hitting the pads in front of the stumps. The batter is said to have been "triggered" or "trig'd" because the Umpire has an itchy trigger finger, ready to raise it to give the batter out easily.
Trimmer
a high-quality fast bowling delivery, especially one that results in a dismissal of a batter by removing the bails without hitting the stumps
Trundler
a reliable, steady medium-pace bowler who is not especially good, but is not especially bad either. See also military medium.
Turn
1. the act of a batter grounding the bat at the end of a run, changing direction, and preparing to take another run. An additional call to the partner is made to specify whether to continue running. Recommended technique is to turn facing the side of the field where the ball was played, to see whether it has been recovered by the fielders and judge whether another run is possible. cf. turn blind, turn short, and two.
2. the amount a spin ball changes directions – turns/spins – after hitting the pitch. For example, "That delivery turned a lot."
Turn blind
a turn facing the wrong way, i.e. away from the ball. Considered poor technique, because it prevents the batter seeing the relevant fielders, makes it difficult to determine the appropriate call, and therefore increases the chance of a run out.
Turn short
see short run.
Tweaker
An informal (often affectionate) term for a spin bowler.
Twelfth man
Traditionally, the first substitute player who fields when a member of the fielding side is injured. In Test matches, twelve players are named to a team prior to the match, with the final reduction to eleven occurring immediately prior to play commencing on the first day. This gives the captain some flexibility in team selection, dependent on the conditions (e.g. a spin bowler may be named to the team, but omitted if the captain feels that the pitch is not suitable for spin bowling). In One Day International games, teams may nominate up to four substitute fielders.
Twenty20 (or T20)
a form of limited overs cricket in which each team has one innings with a maximum length of twenty overs.
Two
1. a delivery from which the batter scored two runs.
2. a call by a batter to their partner, indicating that two runs should be attempted. May be used as a variant of yes, or as a follow-up after push, typically during the turn.

== U ==
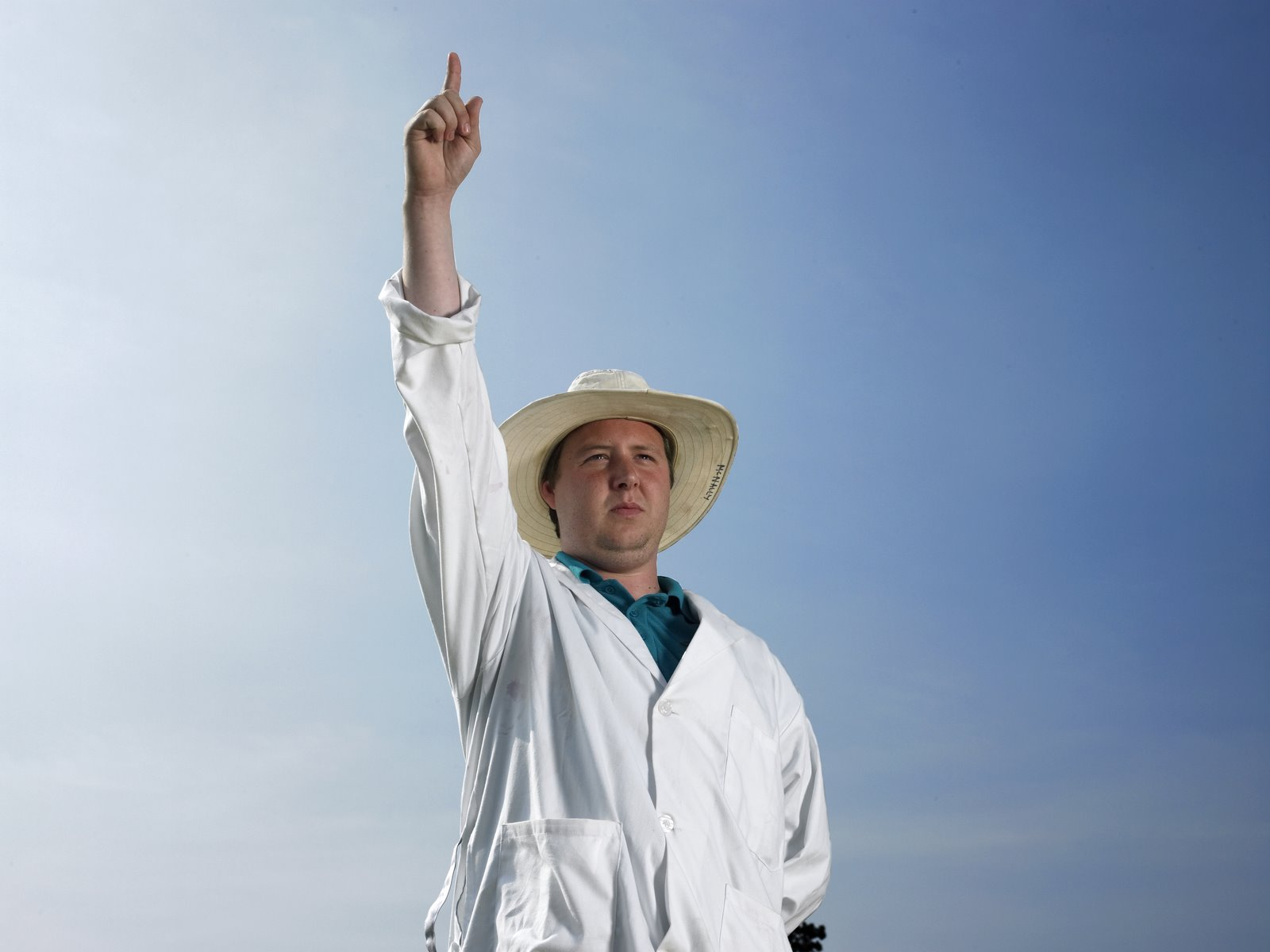
An umpire signalling a dismissal

Umpire
An official who enforces the laws and adjudicates play. One umpire stands behind the wicket at the non-striker's end, while a second (usually) stands at square leg, with the positions alternating for each over. The two on-field umpires use a system of arm signals to indicate decisions to the players and the scorer. Televised matches usually also have a third umpire to adjudicate on replays and the umpire decision review system.
Umpire Decision Review System (UDRS)

Official system to challenge certain decisions made by an umpire. The third umpire then reviews the decision using various technological aids, such as slow motion television replays, ball tracking, a snickometer etc. A batter may challenge a decision of out, and the captain of the fielding side may challenge a not out decision. Teams are limited in the number of unsuccessful reviews per inning; if they have reached that limit they are permitted no further reviews. The umpires themselves can review run out, stumped, caught and no ball decisions, or whether a shot has scored a boundary. Only available in televised games, because the necessary equipment is provided by the broadcaster.
Umpire's call
Outcome of the Umpire Decision Review System if the third umpire finds the evidence inconclusive, or within the stated margin of error. The original umpire's decision stands, but the review does not count towards the team limit on unsuccessful reviews.
Uncapped
a player who has never played at the international level (see "cap (sense 2)".)
Underarm
the action of bowling with the arm swinging from behind the body in a downswing arc and then releasing the ball on the up swing without bending the elbow. This type of bowling is now illegal in formal cricket, but commonly played in informal types of cricket. Compare with overarm.
Under-spin (also back-spin)
backward rotation on the ball, causing it to decrease speed immediately after pitching.
Unorthodox
1. a shot played not in the accepted "textbook" manner, often with a degree of improvisation.
2. a left arm spin bowler who spins the ball with their wrist in a similar manner to a right-arm leg-spin bowler. This imparts spin in the same direction as a right-handed off-spin bowler. See: Left-arm unorthodox spin.
Unplayable delivery
a ball that is impossible for the batter to deal with; used to imply that the batter was out more through the skill of the bowler than through their own error.
Upper Cut
A typical shot played against a short ball or bouncer. Here the batter makes a cut above their head and the ball usually goes to the third-man area. First used in International cricket by Sachin Tendulkar
Uppish
A shot that gains a risky amount of height, opening up the possibility of the batter being caught.

== V ==
V
See Vee.
Variation
Any delivery by the bowler which is not their stock ball. Used to make the bowling less predictable, which may surprise or deceive the batter.
Vee
1. an unmarked, loosely defined V-shaped area on the ground at which the batter stands at the apex. The two sides of the "V" go through the mid-off and mid-on regions, similar to the fair area of a baseball field, or the area where fielders "on the drive" are placed. Most shots played into this region are straight-batted shots, which do not involve the risks associated with playing across the line.
2. the V-shaped joint between the lower end of the handle and the blade of the bat (see also splice).
Very fine leg
see long stop
Village
Adjective, roughly equivalent to 'amateurish', indicating that the standard of play or organisation is typical for village cricket. Pejorative if applied to a professional.
Village cricket
Amateur cricket, particularly in England & Wales, with players typically drawn from a single village or suburb. The level of organisation varies: sometimes games are part of an official league, sometimes only friendly matches. The standard of play is below that of club cricket and often includes beginners to the sport.

== W ==
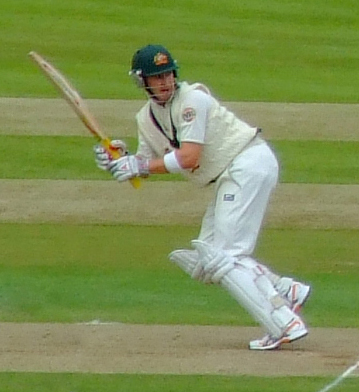
Batter Michael Clarke wearing typical whites

Waft
A loose non-committal shot, usually played to a ball pitched short of length and well wide of the off stump.
Wag
when the tail (the lower order of the batting line-up) scores more runs than it is expected to, it is said to have wagged (as an extension of the animal tail metaphor)
Wagon wheel
1. a graphic which divides the field into six sectors (looking like the spoked wheel of a wagon), indicating how many runs a batter has scored with shots into each sector.
2. see spider graph
Wait

a call by a batter to their partner which defers the decision for a few seconds, before being followed by a call of yes or no. Used when it is unclear whether a fielder will stop the ball or if it will pass. Neither batter should begin a run, but remain ready to do so (including backing up) until the follow-up call is made.
Walk
of a batter, to walk off the pitch, knowing or believing that they are out, rather than waiting for an umpire to give them out (the umpire is required to intervene if they were not about to give an out decision). Generally considered to be sportsmanlike behaviour, but rarer in international cricket than domestic cricket.
Walking in
fielders will, unless fielding close in, usually "walk in" a few paces just before the bowler bowls in order to be alert if ball is hit in their direction.
Walking wicket
a very poor batter, particularly tail-end batters, who is usually a specialist bowler.
Wash out
a cricket match, or a specific day of a cricket match, which is abandoned with either no play or very little play due to rain.
Wearing wicket
On a turf pitch, typically consisting of dry/dead grass on the top, the soil can be loosened because of the players, stepping on it during play, and rough, abrasive patches can form. This means that as the pitch wears, or becomes worn, balls that land in these rough areas will grip the surface more and turn more drastically, thereby becoming more helpful to spin bowling. Uneven bounce can also result.

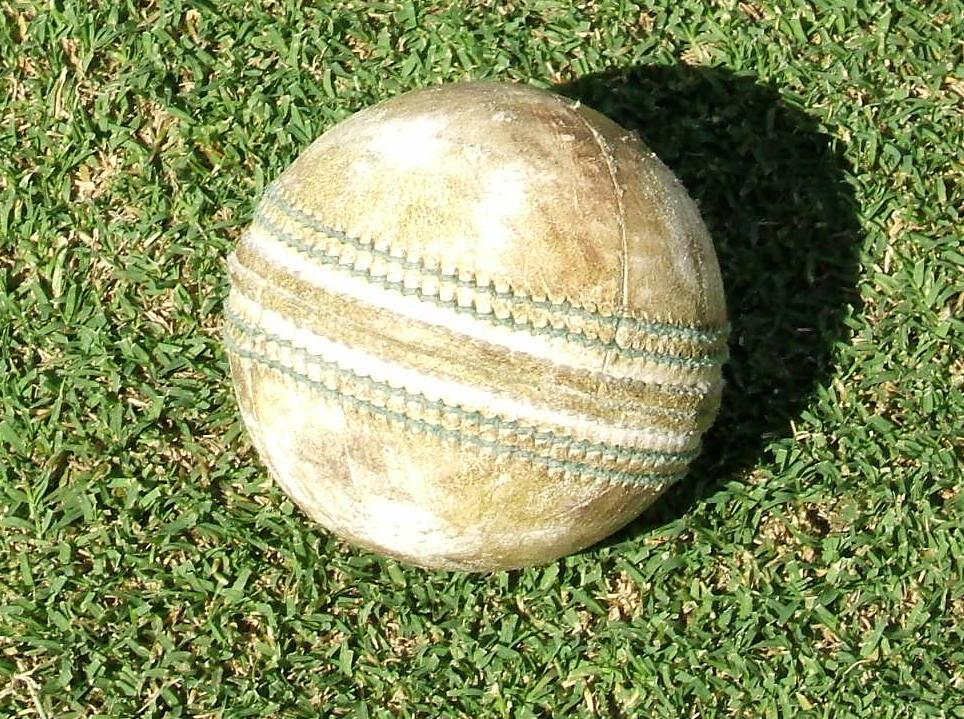
A worn white ball

White ball
A type of ball introduced during the 20th century to facilitate day/night matches, being easier to see under floodlights. Its construction is very similar to the red ball, but the surface is bleached white, rather than dyed. White balls are used in all professional limited overs matches, during which the players wear a brightly coloured team kit. Compared to the red ball, white balls wear more quickly, generally becoming too worn for use after about 30 overs (a 50-over innings uses two white balls, usually one from each end). The white ball also provides more swing, but for fewer overs, than the red ball.
Whites
predominantly white or cream coloured clothing worn by players during matches with a red ball. Usually consists of long trousers, a short- or long-sleeved polo shirt, and optionally a knitted jumper or sleeveless sweater. Professional limited overs matches with a white ball instead use coloured uniforms, known as pyjamas.

Diagram of a wicket composed of stumps and bails – ball shown for scale

Wicket
1. a set of stumps and bails;
2. the pitch; or
3. the dismissal of a batter. Numerous phrases exist using this definition, such as "throwing away one's wicket", which means to get out too easily, or "valuing/putting a price on one's wicket", which is largely the opposite
Wicket-keeper
the player on the fielding side who stands immediately behind the batting end wicket. A specialist position, used throughout the game. The wicket-keeper is the only player in the fielding side allowed to wear gloves and external leg guards, under Law 40.
Wicket-keeper-batter
a wicket-keeper who is also a very good batter, capable of opening the batting or making good scores in the top order.
Wicket maiden
a maiden over in which the bowler also dismisses a batter. A double wicket maiden if two wickets are taken, and so on.
Wicket-to-wicket (or stump-to-stump)
an imaginary line connecting the two wickets, also a style of straight, un-varied bowling.
Wickets in hand
The number of wickets remaining in the innings for the batting side. For example, a team which has lost four of its ten wickets is said to 'have six wickets in hand'.
Wide
a delivery that passes illegally wide of the wicket, scoring an extra for the batting side. A wide does not count as one of the six valid deliveries that must be made in each over – an extra ball must be bowled for each wide.
Wisden
Wisden Cricketers' Almanack, or simply Wisden, colloquially the (Yellow) Bible of Cricket, is a cricket reference book published annually since 1864 in the UK. In 1998 an Australian and in 2012 an Indian edition was launched.
Women's cricket
Cricket played between teams consisting solely of women. First recorded in 1745, it was administered separately from men's cricket until 2005. There are almost no differences in the rules.
Worm
a plot of either the cumulative runs scored, or the progressive run rate achieved by a team (the y-axis) against the over number (x-axis) in limited-overs cricket.

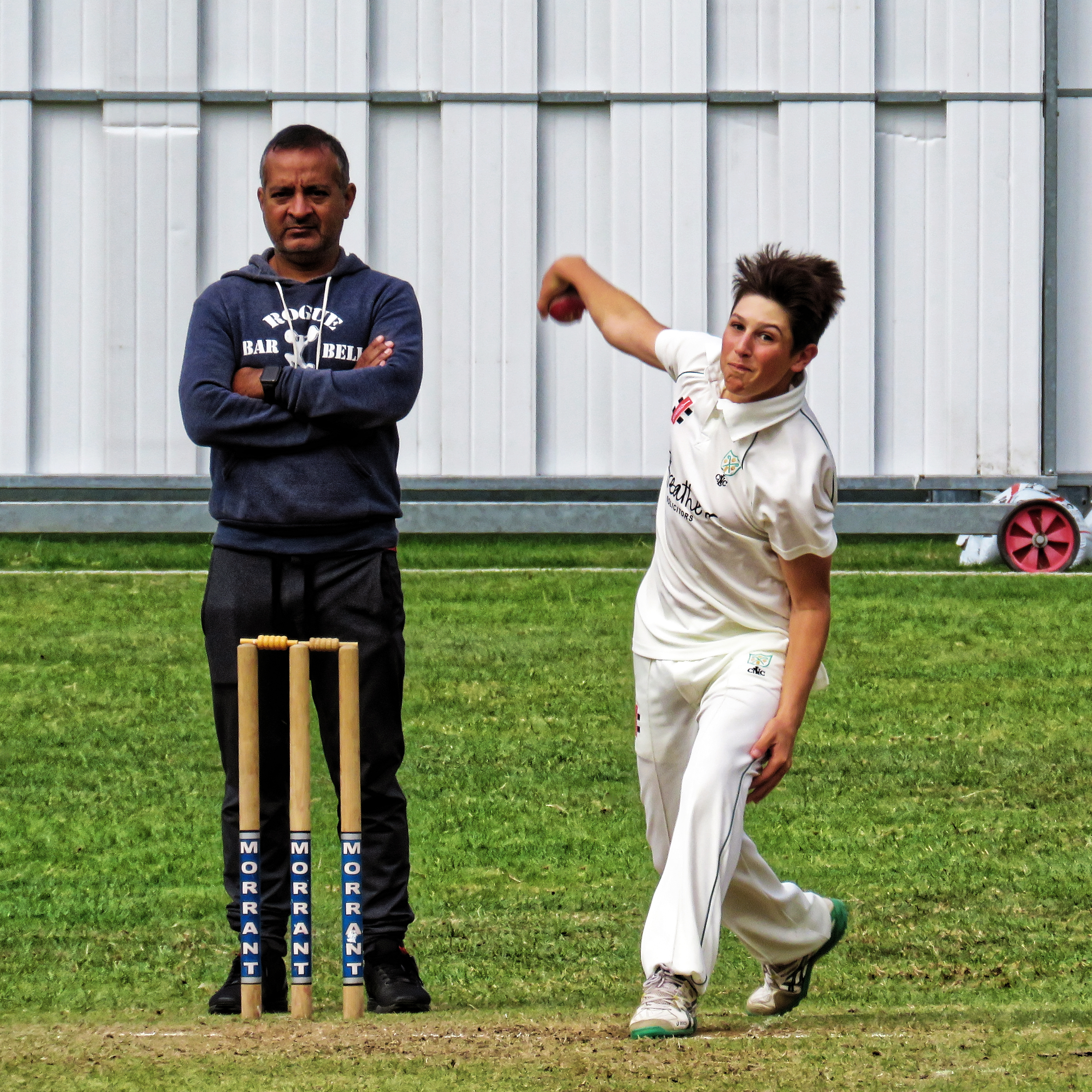
A bowler delivering wrist spin

Wrist spin
a form of spin bowling in which the ball is made to rotate by the position or movement of the bowler's wrist (contrast with finger spin). For a right-handed bowler this produces leg spin, whereas the same technique by a left-handed bowler produces left arm unorthodox spin.
Wrong foot
when the bowling foot is the front foot the delivery is said to be bowled off the wrong foot. Such a bowler is said to bowl off the wrong foot.
Wrong footed
when the batter is initially moving either back or forward to a delivery and then has to suddenly change which foot they use (back or front), they are said to have been wrong-footed. Usually applies to spin bowling.
Wrong 'un
another name for a googly; most common in Australia.

== Y ==
Yes
a call by a batter to their partner, indicating both should attempt a run. cf. no and wait. Variants of the yes call include push, two and three.
(The) Yips
The yips are occasionally experienced by bowlers suffering from a loss of confidence. A psychological condition whereby the bowler is unable to sufficiently relax when delivering the ball – often holding the ball too long before release, losing flight, turn and accuracy in the process. Bowlers have been known to suffer from the yips for as little as a few overs, up to the course of an entire season or more.
Yorker
a (usually fast) delivery that is pitched very close to the batter. The intent is for it to pitch exactly underneath their bat or on their toes, in the block hole. A perfectly pitched fast yorker is very difficult for a batter to play; however a poorly delivered yorker can turn into a half-volley (too short) or a full toss (too full).

== Z ==
Zooter or Zoota
a variation of the flipper bowled by a leg-break bowler. Typically, 'Zoots' along the ground without much bounce. This ball is possibly a myth made up by Shane Warne to create confusion amongst opposition sides.
