= Finger spin =

Type of spin bowling in cricket

Finger spin is a type of bowling in the sport of cricket. It refers to the technique and specific hand movements associated with imparting a particular direction of spin to the cricket ball. The other spinning technique, generally used to spin the ball in the opposite direction, is wrist spin. Although there are exceptions, finger spinners generally turn the ball less than wrist spinners. However, because the technique is simpler and easier to master, finger spinners tend to be more accurate.

The name finger spin is actually something of a misnomer, as the finger action is not a vital part of the mechanism for producing the characteristic spin on the ball. A finger spin delivery is released with the arm held in a fully supinated position, with the fingers on the outside of the ball (to the right for a right-handed bowler). If this supinated position is maintained through the release, the fingers will naturally cut down the side of the ball and produce a clockwise spin. The great English finger spinner Derek Underwood is famous for bowling finger spin in this manner.

Additional spin may be put on the ball through two other means: the active supination of the arm from an initially pronated position just before the ball is released, and the flexion or extension of the wrist at the moment of release. Both techniques increase the effect of the cutting mechanism. The slower a spin bowler delivers the ball, the more actively he must attempt to impart spin onto it to maintain the same rate of revolution.

== Types of finger spinner ==
An off spin delivery.

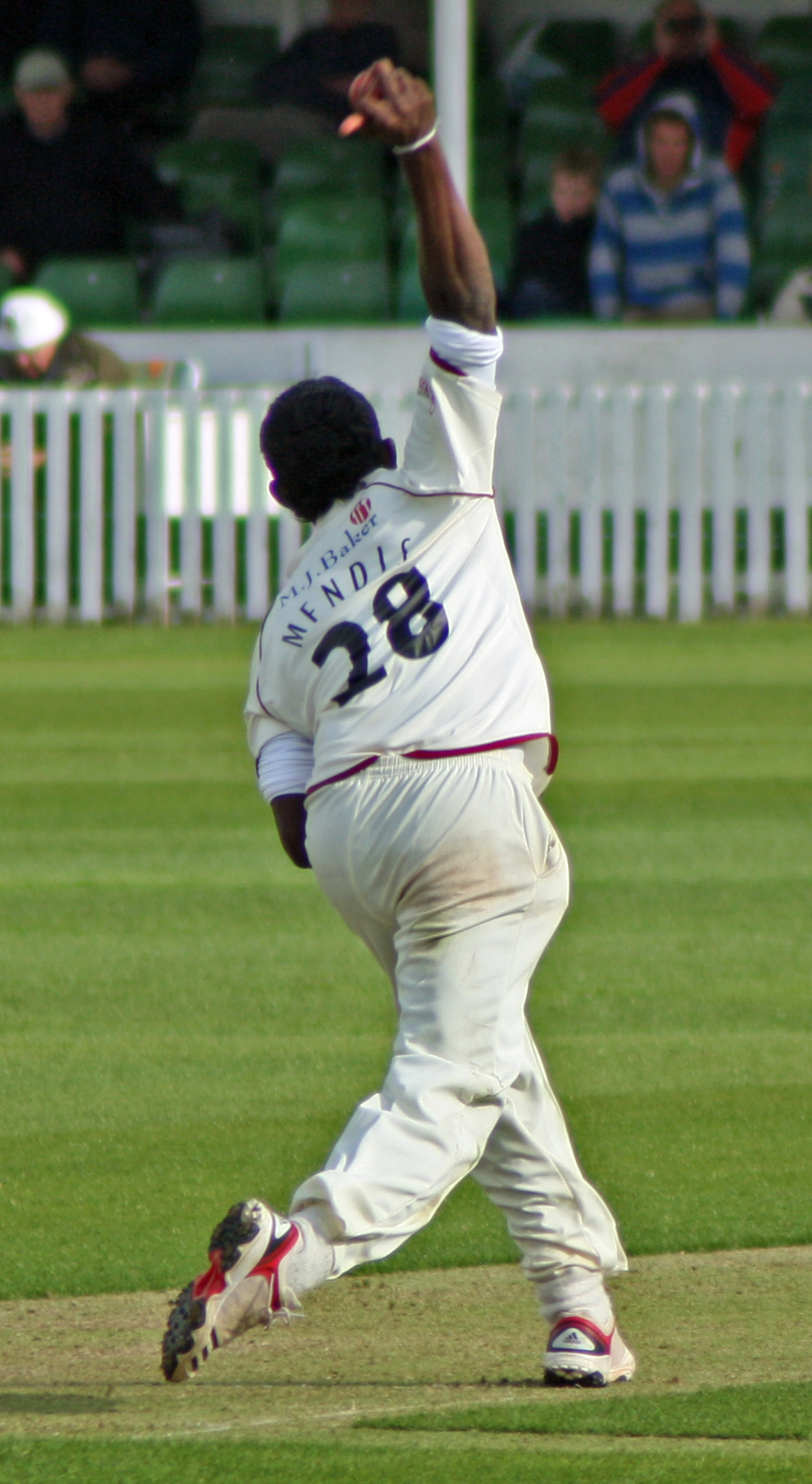
Ajantha Mendis at the point of delivery.

Although finger spin may be bowled with the same technique (albeit laterally inverted, as though viewed in a mirror) by both right and left handed bowlers, such bowlers are often discussed separately, as the direction in which the ball deviates as it bounces on the cricket pitch is different:

- Right-handed finger spin is known as an off spin.
- Left-handed finger spin is known as a left-arm orthodox spin.

For simplicity's sake, the rest of this article assumes a right-handed finger spinner bowling to a right-handed batsman.

However, increasingly, the distinction must be made between traditional finger spinners and non-traditional finger spinners, particularly with innovations (such as the doosra and carrom balls) which require a different grip on the ball (and consequently a different bowling technique).

Such styles of bowling may be categorised as follows

- Traditional finger spin, where the ball is gripped with the top knuckles of the index and middle fingers firmly gripping across the seam. The thumb is held clear of the ball, or rests lightly on the seam. Notable users of this technique include Graeme Swann and Nathan Lyon. Variations normally used with this type of bowling include the arm ball and the top-spinner.
- Middle-finger spin, where the ball is gripped with the middle finger running directly over the top of the ball, with the knuckles of the index and ring finger gripping the ball from beneath, as exemplified by Saeed Ajmal, Saqlain Mushtaq and Suresh Raina. The stock ball is an off-break, with the middle and then index finger running over the seam to produce revolutions. Variations normally used include the doosra and the teesra.
- Carrom spin (Carrom ball), in which the ball is held between the middle finger and the thumb, with the middle finger parallel to the palm of the hand. Instead of a conventional release, the ball is squeezed out and flicked by the fingers like a carrom player flicking the disc on a carrom board. However, normally this delivery will be a leg break, although off breaks, top-spinners, and back-spinners may be bowled using this grip, as demonstrated by Jack Iverson. Current users of this delivery include Ajantha Mendis and Ravichandran Ashwin.

There exist other sorts of finger-spin, but this section should be viewed mainly as a guide to the main types used in international cricket today. There are those who would add the type of spin bowled by Muttiah Muralidharan to this list, and although his stock bowl is a right-handed off-break, such a bowling technique would be better described as non-traditional wristspin, owing to the extent to which the wrist, far more so than the fingers, are involved in generating revolutions on the ball.

== Grip ==
A finger spinner grips the ball with the top knuckles of the index and middle fingers firmly gripping across the seam. The thumb is held clear of the ball.

== Process ==
The stock ball for a right-handed finger spinner has a clockwise component of spin as well as a component of top spin. The stock ball for a left-handed finger spinner rotates the anticlockwise as seen by the bowler. For some finger spinners the index and middle fingers do a lot of work, snapping, to impart spin on the ball. At the other end of the spectrum there are finger spinners who rely much more on the wrist action. Either way, the wrist position at the point of release determines how the ball spins.

Wrist position for finger spinner
| Wrist position | Delivery | Intended outcome |
|---|---|---|
| Palm of hand facing batsman | Traditional off spinner. Side spinner. | Drifts away from batsman. Turns from off to leg side of the pitch. |
| Side of hand pointed to leg slip | Stock or attacking ball – part top spin, part side spin | Some turn, some dip or bounce and some drift. |
| Side of hand pointed to batsman | Top spinner | Dip – bounces high or lower in length. |
| Back of hand facing batsman | Doosra | Spinning from leg to off the pitch |
| Back of hand facing the ground | Under cutter | A drift |

== Variations ==
There is a large range of variations used by fingerspinners, with a brief description of the most common given below.

- Arm ball – a delivery with an upright seam faced towards the batsmen, which swings in and follows the direction of the arm. Generally bowled with a lot of backspin.
- Topspinner – a delivery with an upright seam rotating towards the batsmen, which generally tends to dip and bounce more than other deliveries
- Undercutter – a delivery with the seam horizontal, that skids on towards the batsmen. Seldom used in recent times.
- Doosra – a ball that turns from leg to off (a legbreak), but that is delivered in a similar manner to the traditional offbreak, such that it can be extremely difficult to differentiate between the two.
- Teesra – otherwise known as a backspinner, this delivery rotates backwards from the view of the batsmen, with the seam scrambled (thus differentiating it from the arm ball).
- Carrom ball – a surprise variation, flicked off the middle finger (in a similar fashion to a disk in the Asian game of Carrom) that turns from leg to off (a legbreak).

== Off-spin ==
Traditionally, finger spinners bowled with an emphasis on side spin. With the advent of covered and better batting pitches the focus changed to bowling with a component of top spin. The top spin provides loop which makes it harder for the batsman to make an early judgement of the length of the delivery. The ball tends to be released with a slightly upward trajectory which raises the ball above the batsman's eye line. The topspin on the ball then causes the ball to dip earlier and bounce higher.

The side spin component of the delivery causes it to drift, courtesy of Bernoulli's principle. For a stock, side spin or under cutter this causes the ball to drift away from the batsman. The combination of drift, loop and spin combine to provide the finger spinner's attacking ability.

== Doosra ==
A doosra (Urdu: دوسرا, Hindi दूसरा) is a particular type of delivery by an off-spin bowler in the sport of cricket, popularised by Pakistani cricketer Saqlain Mushtaq. The term means ‘(the) second (one)’, or ’(the) other (one)’ in Urdu (and Hindi). Saqlain Mushtaq has also invented a variant of the doosra, a ball which he calls the ‘teesra’, meaning ’(the) third (one)’.

Other bowlers have made considerable use of the doosra in international cricket, including Sri Lankan Muttiah Muralitharan, South African Johan Botha, India's Harbhajan Singh and the Pakistanis Shoaib Malik and Saeed Ajmal.

The doosra is a relatively new type of delivery. Saqlain Mushtaq is credited with its invention, which was integral to both his success and the future of off-spin bowling, as it is unlikely that any off-spinner prior to him ever bowled a delivery which turned from leg.

The naming of the delivery is attributed to Moin Khan, the former Pakistani wicketkeeper, who would call on Mushtaq to bowl the "doosra" (the other one) from behind the stumps. Tony Greig, a commentator in one of these matches, eventually linked the word to the delivery and confirmed it with Saqlain in a post-match interview. Thus the term became a part of cricketing culture. The doosra is now an important part of the off-spin armoury.

Some people, however, feel that the real pioneer of the doosra was Sonny Ramadhin, who played for the West Indies in the 1950s, as he moved the ball both ways, despite gripping the ball like an off-break bowler.

The bowler delivers the ball with the same finger action as a normal off break but cocks the wrist so that the back of the hand faces the batsman. This gives the ball spin in the opposite direction to that for an off break, causing it to spin from the leg side to the off side to a right-handed batsman.

The doosra is the off-spinner's equivalent of the leg-spinner's googly, which spins in the opposite direction to the leg spinner's stock ball.

== Carrom ball ==
In a carrom ball, the ball is released by flicking it between the thumb and a bent middle finger to impart spin. Though the delivery is known to date from at least the 1940s, it was re-introduced into mainstream international cricket in the late 2000s by Ajantha Mendis of Sri Lanka, Ravichandran Ashwin of India further popularised the carrom ball.

== Topspinner ==
A top-spinner is a type of delivery bowled by a cricketer bowling either wrist spin or finger spin. In either case, the bowler imparts the ball with top spin by twisting it with his or her fingers prior to delivery. In both cases, the topspinner is the halfway house between the stock delivery and the wrong'un – in the wrist spinner's case his googly, and in the finger spinner's case his doosra.

A topspinning cricket ball behaves similarly to top spin shots in tennis or table tennis. The forward spinning motion impedes air travelling over the ball, but assists air travelling underneath. The difference in air pressure above and underneath the ball (described as the Magnus effect) acts as a downward force, meaning that the ball falls earlier and faster than normal.

In cricketing terms, this means that the ball drops shorter, falls faster and bounces higher than might otherwise be anticipated by the batsman. These properties are summed up in cricketing terms as a "looping" or "loopy" delivery. Also, the ball travels straight on, as compared to a wrist spin or finger spin stock delivery that breaks to the left or right on impact. A batsman may easily be deceived by the ball, particularly given that the action is quite similar to the stock delivery.

In delivery, the topspinner is gripped like a normal side spinner. For a legspinner the back of the hand faces the cover region and the palm of the hand faces the mid wicket region at release. For an offspinner, these directions are reversed. The ball is then released either with the seam going straight on to the batsman, or with a scrambled seam. A spinner will frequently bowl deliveries with both top spin and side spin. A ball presenting with roughly equal amounts of both is usually called an "overspinning" leg break or off break.

Tactically, a bowler will bowl topspinners to draw a batsman forward before using the dip and extra bounce to deceive them. In particular, batsmen looking to sweep or drive are vulnerable as the bounce can defeat them. It is one of the best spinning tactics in the field of finger spinning.

== Undercutter ==
The undercutter is a delivery bowled by a finger spin bowler in cricket. It is delivered with the arm tilted in such a way that the palm of the bowling hand is facing the sky at point of release. The ball will then be released with a horizontal side spin instead of the orthodox clockwise spin that the stock delivery is released with. This unique angle of spin will cause the ball to swerve sideways due to the magnus force in a similar manner to the drift produced on the stock delivery, but instead of turning, the ball will continue on its path.

== Backspinner, or Teesra ==
One common variation bowled by finger spinners is the backspinner, currently being rebranded the teesra. This ball is usually bowled slightly faster than the orthodox off-spin delivery, with the fingers rolling down the back of the ball at release instead of down the side. The backspin makes the flight of the ball hard to judge, and may make the ball keep low. This delivery is entirely analogous to the wristspinner's slider.

The Teesra is a delivery recently made famous by renowned off-spinner Saqlain Mushtaq. However, upon closer inspection, the ball is simply an orthodox backspinner: a very common delivery that has been bowled by finger spinners as long as cricket has been played.

The delivery was renamed in the Indian Cricket League by Saqlain Mushtaq. At that time Saqlain played for the Lahore Badshahs. The first person to face the teesra or Jalebi was Russel Arnold of Sri Lanka when he was correctly given LBW by the umpire. He was also the first person to get out at the hands of the teesra as well. He got out the fourth time a teesra had ever been bowled.

The delivery was invented on the basis that it acts like a slider (which is used by a Leg-spinner) The delivery is held by an off-spinner in his normal action but instead of twisting the arm at the point of the delivery, the bowler simply rolls his fingers down the back of the ball. The delivery looks like it will turn a lot but it does not turn at all. This is a good way of deceiving the batsman that it will turn.

The name for the teesra was commonly used by Saqlain and that it originates from the first delivery the doosra because the doosra means the "other one" or "second one" in Urdu, Saqlain decided to call it the teesra meaning the "third one". The name Jalebi was introduced as soon as the delivery was bowled, many Indian commentators started using the name Jalebi. Jalebi is a sweet pastry commonly eaten in the sub-continent. However the name "backspinner" is by far the more common name that describes accurately the spin on the ball as it travels through the air.

The delivery itself has been used for over a century, although Saqlain Mushtaq brought renewed attention to it through his use of the ball in the Indian Cricket League. He has also experimented with the delivery in county cricket, describing it as a work in progress. Saqlain has said that he aims to refine the teesra so that batters find it harder to predict the direction of the spin, or whether the ball will turn at all.

== Arm ball ==
An arm ball is a type of delivery in cricket. It is a variation delivery bowled by an off spin bowler or slow left-arm orthodox bowler. It is related to the orthodox backspinner.

In contrast to the stock delivery, an arm ball is delivered without rolling the fingers down the side of the ball on release. This means the ball has backspin on it, and it does not turn appreciably off the pitch. Instead, it travels straight on in the direction of the arm, from which it derives its name. However, by keeping the seam upright, the bowler can also hope to obtain some outswing away from the right-handed batsman, thereby confusing the batsman who expects the ball to turn. In comparison to the orthodox backspinner, the arm ball is less well disguised and easier to spot due to the visibly vertical seam orientation, but the extra swing involved more than makes up for this.

The arm ball is best used as a surprise variation by a spinner who is turning the ball considerably. A complacent or poorly skilled batsman playing for the expected spin can be taken by surprise and get out bowled or lbw, or edge the ball with the outside edge of the bat to offer a catch to the wicket-keeper or slip fielders. Sanath Jayasuriya, Ravindra Jadeja, Saqlain Mushtaq, Daniel Vettori and Mohammad Rafique use the arm ball to good effect.

== Coaching ==
Other key elements of the process of finger spin are:

- Foot alignment – a line drawn through the back and front feet should line up with where the ball is intended to the cricket pitch. Typically the back foot is nearly side on and the front foot between side on and pointing to the target. This aligns the body to deliver the ball to the target.
- Releasing the ball with the weight over the front foot. This drives the bowlers momentum towards the target. It also lets the bowler release the ball from maximum height.
- A vertical shoulder rotation that completes, for a right-handed bowler, with the right shoulder pointing at the target.
- Such a shoulder rotation can be obtained by encouraging the bowler to enter the delivery stride (the last step taken before the ball is released) with the left shoulder facing the batsmen, before swivelling about the front foot while bringing the arm over.
- Traditional fingerspinners may also be encouraged to visualize "pulling a chain" with the right hand during the delivery. This often helps in obtaining the right wrist position and movement of the fingers at the moment of delivery.
- Leaning backwards slightly when entering the delivery stride may also help in generating pace and revolutions on the ball.
- Similarly, extending the left arm skyward just before the delivery stride, before dragging the left elbow low and close to the body during the release will also help in increasing both the speed and spin of the ball.

== See also ==
- Wrist spin
- Cricket terminology
