= Carrom ball =

Style of spin bowling delivery in cricket

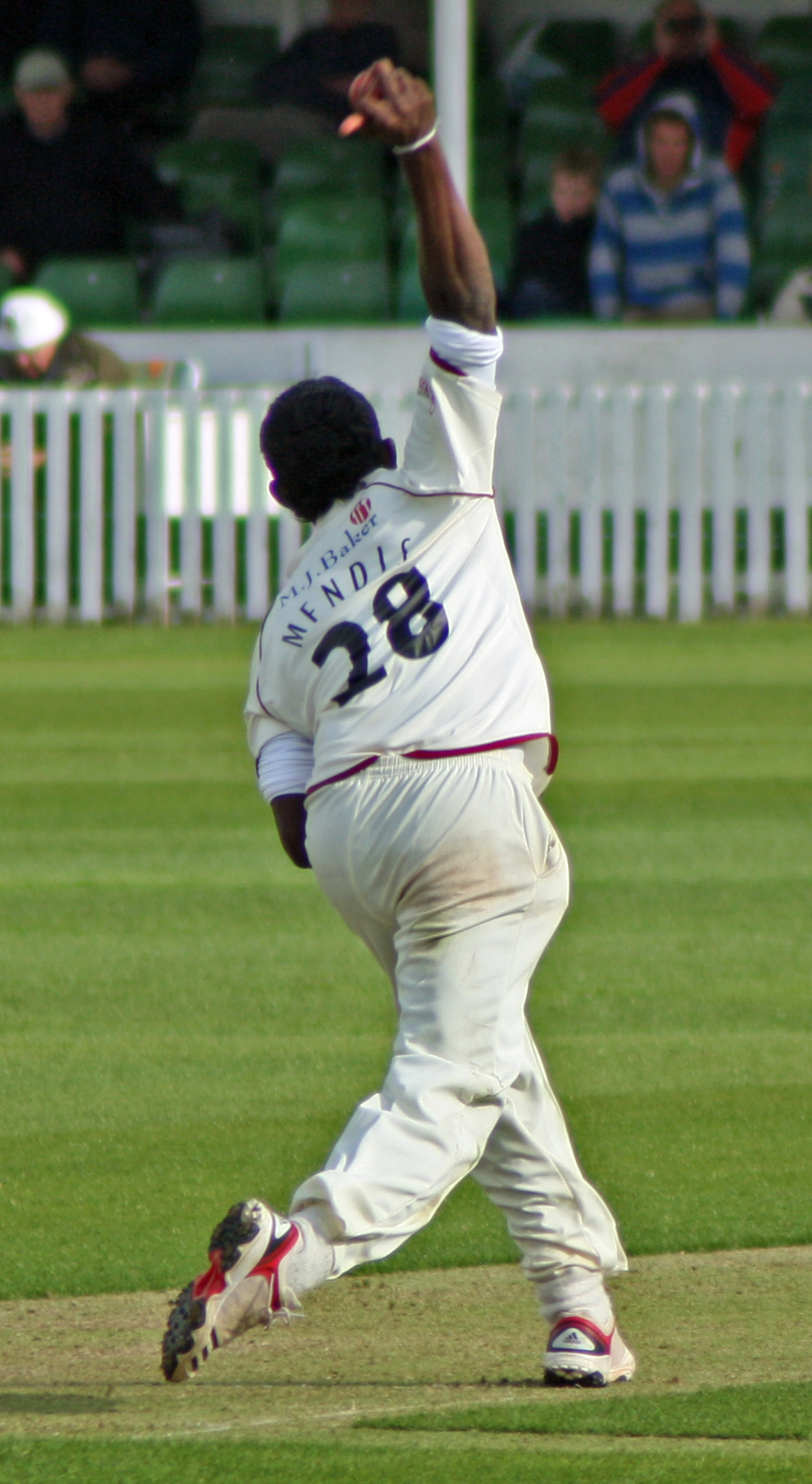
Ajantha Mendis bowling a carrom ball, 2011

The carrom ball is a style of spin bowling delivery used in cricket. The ball is released by flicking it between the thumb and a bent middle finger in order to impart spin.

== Origin and history ==
The first bowler known to have used this style of delivery was the Australian Jack Iverson from Victoria, who used it throughout his Test cricket career in the period after the Second World War, although he did not use the name "carrom ball". Fellow Australian John Gleeson used a similar grip a decade later, but by the end of the 1970s the method was almost forgotten. It has since re-entered cricketing consciousness because of its use by Ajantha Mendis of Sri Lanka, with the new name of carrom ball. Mendis unveiled this delivery during the 2008 Asia Cup. Sri Lankan Rangana Herath is believed to be the first left handed spin bowler to have used the method in international cricket, dismissing Australian opener David Warner with a delivery in the carrom ball style during a test match.

== Method ==
The ball is held between the thumb, forefinger and the middle finger and, instead of a conventional release, the ball is squeezed out and flicked by the fingers like a carrom player flicking the disc on a carrom board. It is different from wrist-bowled deliveries. Traditional leg-spin is bowled with anti-clockwise wrist movement for a right-armed bowler. A finger-bowled delivery such as traditional off-spin is bowled with a clockwise finger movement. In a carrom delivery, the middle finger and thumb flick or squeeze the ball out of the hand, like a carrom player flicking a striker in the indoor game of carrom. When the center finger is gripped towards the leg side, the ball spins from leg to off; when the center finger is gripped towards the off side, the ball spins from off to leg. Depending on the degree the ball is gripped towards the leg side, the carrom ball could also travel straight. The carrom ball can therefore spin to either the off or leg sides or travel straight (as opposed to the misconception that it only spins towards the off side).

== See also ==
- Doosra
- Googly
- Leg spin
- Off spin
- Wrist spin
- Top Spin
- Flipper Ball
