= Paul Garlick (Australian cricketer) =

Australian cricketer (born 1968)

Personal information
- Full name: Paul Anthony Garlick
- Born: 21 September 1968 (age 58); Sandringham, Victoria, Australia
- Batting: Left-handed
- Bowling: Leg break googly

Domestic team information
- Years: Team
- 1993: Victoria

Career statistics
Competition	FC
Matches	1
Runs scored	8
Batting average	–
100s/50s	–/–
Top score	8*
Balls bowled	66
Wickets	–
Bowling average	–
5 wickets in innings	–
10 wickets in match	–
Best bowling	–
Catches/stumpings	1/–
- Source: Cricinfo, 5 April 2010

Paul Anthony Garlick (born 21 September 1968) is a former Australian cricketer. Garlick was a left-handed batsman who bowled Leg break googly.

Garlick represented Victoria in a single first-class against Tasmania. Garlick scored 8 runs and bowled 11 wicketless overs in the match. This was Garlicks only representative appearance for Victoria.

== See also ==
- List of Victoria first-class cricketers
