= Slider (cricket) =

Delivery in cricket

In cricket, a slider is a type of delivery bowled by a wrist spin bowler. While a topspinner is released with the thumb facing the batter, a slider is bowled in a similar manner to a legbreak, but instead of imparting sidespin with the third finger, the bowler allows his fingers to roll down the back of the ball, providing a mixture of sidespin and backspin. Whereas a topspinner tends to dip more quickly and bounce higher than a normal delivery, a slider does the opposite: it carries to a fuller length and bounces less than the batter might expect. The sliders will typically head towards the batter with a scrambled seam (with the ball not spinning in the direction of the seam, so the seam direction is not constant, unlike in conventional spin bowling). This has less effect on the flight and bounce but absence of leg spin may deceive the batter. Frequently the slider is bowled with a mixture of side spin and backspin. This has the effect of making the ball harder to differentiate from the leg break for the batters without reducing the mechanical effects caused by the backspin. This delivery may skid straight on or it may turn a small amount.

It is claimed that Shane Warne invented this type of delivery. However, this is inaccurate. The Australian spinner Peter Philpott used the technique in the 1960s, calling it simply an orthodox backspinner, while Australian all-rounder and captain Richie Benaud used what he called his 'sliding topspinner' which appears again to have been similar. Since he was taught the technique by Doug Ring, it may be more accurate to suggest that Ring is the originator. Either that, or the ball is one of those deliveries with no easily identifiable point of origin. However Shane Warne's use of the delivery in the 2005 Ashes brought the variation once more into the public consciousness. His dismissal of Ian Bell lbw with the delivery was a classic piece of spin bowling; Bell played for the turn of a normal leg break, but the delivery skidded straight into his front pad without turning.

Although there is often a good deal of confusion on the subject, the slider is thought to be more or less an identical delivery to the "zooter".

Finger spin bowlers, like Ravindra Jadeja, commonly bowl an exactly equivalent ball, which comes out of the front of the hand with backspin present. However the name slider has not passed over into common parlance for its offspin cousin, and the terms arm ball, backspinner or, more recently, teesra are used instead.

== See also ==
- Cricket terminology
- Leg spin
