= Delivery (cricket) =

Single action of bowling a cricket ball

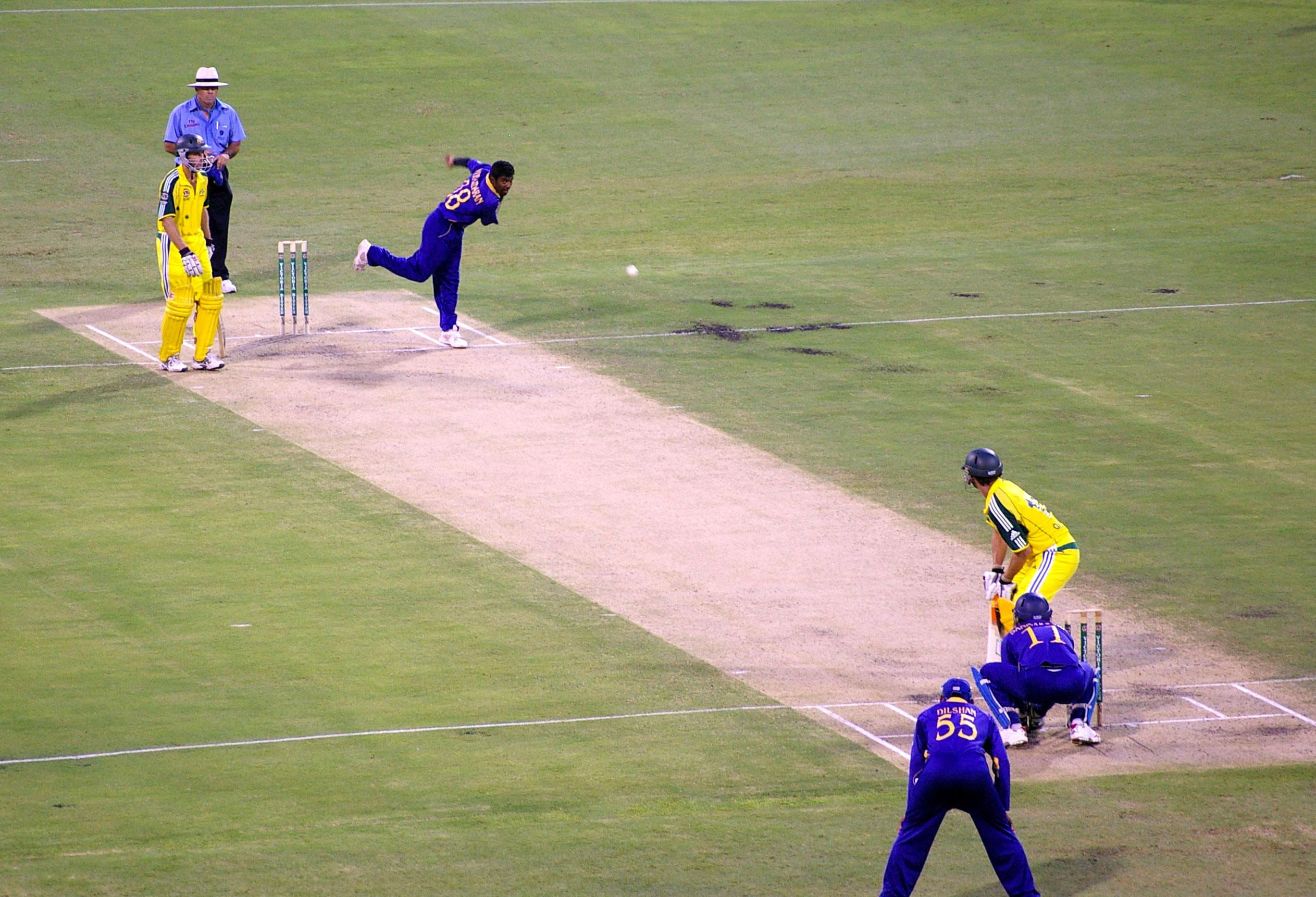
Sri Lanka spinner Muttiah Muralitharan bowling to the batter, Adam Gilchrist

A delivery or ball in cricket is the single action of bowling a cricket ball toward the batter. Once the ball has been delivered, batters may attempt to score runs, with the bowler and other fielders attempting to stop this by getting the batters out. When the ball becomes dead, the next delivery can begin.

During the play of the game, a member of the fielding team is designated as the bowler and bowls deliveries toward the batter. Six legal balls in a row constitutes an over, after which a different member of the fielding side takes over the role of bowler for the next over. The bowler delivers the ball from their end of the pitch toward the batter standing at the opposite wicket at the other end of the pitch. Bowlers can be either left-handed or right-handed. This approach to their delivery, in addition to their decision of bowling around the wicket (from the sides of the wicket on the bowler's end) or over the wicket, is knowledge of which the umpire and the batter are to be made aware.

Some forms of cricket limit the number of legal deliveries that may be bowled in each innings; for example, 100-ball cricket has a maximum of 200 legal deliveries in the game (unless there is a tie). Every delivery in a cricket match is notated by the number of completed overs that have occurred before that delivery, as well as which delivery in the current over that delivery is; for example, "Over 14.2" indicates that 14 overs have been completed and the second delivery of the 15th over is the one under consideration. Since illegal deliveries do not count towards the progression of an over, a set of consecutive illegal deliveries (and the legal delivery that follows them) will have the same notation. Illegal deliveries usually occur when a bowler bowls from too close to the batter, or delivers the ball out of the batter's reach.

== Legal and illegal deliveries ==
All deliveries are either legal (also known as fair, valid, or "one of the over"), illegal, or in rare circumstances, called dead and invalidated.

=== Illegal deliveries ===
An illegal delivery always results in the batting team being awarded one run in addition to any other runs scored off the illegal delivery, does not count towards the completion of an over, and is divided into two categories: wides and no-balls. No-balls are considered a more serious infraction than wides, with the batters being shielded from most methods of dismissal, and in some competitions result in the batting team being awarded two additional runs and/or a "free hit" on the next legal delivery (on a free hit delivery, the batters have the same protections against being dismissed as on a no-ball).

==== Wides ====
A delivery is called wide if it is so far out of reach of the striker that it can not be hit by the striker through the use of a normal cricket stroke. Note however that a delivery may not be called a wide if the striker changes their positioning before the ball is bowled in such a way that they bring the ball within their reach.

==== No-balls ====
A delivery can be called a no-ball for various reasons, which may pertain either to the actions of the bowler or the other players on the fielding team. The most common reasons a no-ball occurs are because the bowler either fails to keep some part of his front foot behind the popping crease when bowling the ball, or bowls the ball and it reaches the striker above the waist without having bounced before reaching the striker.

== Types of delivery ==
Deliveries can be made by fast bowlers or by spin bowlers. Fast bowlers tend to make the ball either move off the pitch (‘seam’) or move through the air (’swing’), while spinners make the ball ’turn’ either toward a right-handed batter (as in the case of off spin and left-arm unorthodox spin) or away from him (as in the case of leg spin and left-arm orthodox spin).

The ball can bounce at different distances from the batter, this is called the length of the delivery. It can range from a bouncer (often bouncing as high as the batter's head) to a yorker (landing at his feet).

There are many different types of delivery that a bowler can bowl. These deliveries vary by: technique, the hand the bowler bowls with, use of the fingers, use of the seam, how the ball is positioned in the hand, where the ball is pitched on the wicket, the speed of the ball, and the tactical intent of the bowler.

- Leg spin deliveries and mirror equivalents for left arm unorthodox spin:
  - Leg break
  - Googly
  - Topspinner
  - Flicker ball
  - Slider
  - Flipper
- Off spin deliveries and mirror equivalents for left arm orthodox spin:
  - Off break
  - Doosra
  - Topspinner
  - Carrom ball
  - Arm ball
  - Teesra
- Fast bowling deliveries:
  - Bouncer
  - Inswinger
  - Reverse swing
  - Leg cutter
  - Off cutter
  - Outswinger
  - Yorker
  - Beamer (illegal)
  - Knuckleball
  - Slower ball

== Tactical considerations ==
The variations in different types of delivery, as well as variations caused by directing the ball with differing line and length, are key weapons in a bowler's arsenal. Throughout an over, the bowler will choose a sequence of deliveries designed to attack the batter's concentration and technique, in an effort to get him out.

The bowler also varies the amount of loop and pace imparted to various deliveries to try to cause the batter to misjudge and make a mistake. As the crease has a width, the bowler can change the angle from which he delivers to the batter in an attempt to induce a misjudgement.

Usually, the bowler decides what type of delivery to bowl next, without consultation or even informing any other member of his team. Sometimes, the team captain will offer advice or even issue a direct order regarding what deliveries to bowl, based on his observations of the batter and the strategic state of the game. Another player who occasionally offers advice to the bowler is the wicket-keeper, since he has a unique view of the batter and may be able to spot weaknesses of technique.

Another piece of information important for the bowlers to consider prior to their deliveries is the state of pitch. The pitch is a natural ground and its state is subjected to variation over the course of the cricket, some of which are multi-day events such as test matches. Spinners find an old pitch, one that has been frequently used, more suitable to their deliveries rather than a fresh pitch, one that has not come under use as much such as a pitch at the start of the match.

=== The batter's anticipation of the delivery ===
While a bowler, with the use of variations in their delivery aims to target the concentration of batters as well as their skill and technique of batting, anticipation of the delivery is crucial for the batter, as emphasised by Jodi Richardson. Richardson reveals the world class batter's dilemma while facing fast bowlers, stating that the time between the batters' anticipation of the trajectory of the ball and positioning themselves for the appropriate shot can be twice as long as the interval between the ball leaving the bowler's hand and reaching the batter's crease. Side by side, Richardson alludes to the research undertaken by Dr. Sean Müller in Australia which was partly funded by Cricket Australia's Centre of Excellence. The results of the research demonstrated the importance of anticipation of the delivery for batters in cricket. They revealed that experienced batters possessed a unique ability which enabled them to adjust their feet as well as their positioning on the crease accordingly based upon their reading of the body language and movements enacted by the bowler prior to the release of the ball. This foresight that batters use while on the crease is referred to as 'advance information' by Richardson. Moreover, Müller's research outlined that the presence of this 'advance information' was not as evident among the lesser skilled batters in comparison to the experienced ones.

== Controversies and debate involving deliveries ==
=== Underarm bowling ===
Underarm or lob bowling was the original cricket delivery style, but had largely died out before the 20th century, although it was used until 1910 by George Simpson-Hayward, and remained a legal delivery type. On 1 February 1981, when Australia was playing New Zealand in a One Day International cricket match, and New Zealand needed six runs to tie the match from the final ball. Greg Chappell, the Australian captain, ordered the bowler (his brother Trevor) to bowl underarm, rolling the ball along the ground to prevent the Number 10 New Zealand batter (Brian McKechnie) any chance of hitting a six from the last ball to tie the match.

After the game, the then Prime Minister of New Zealand, Rob Muldoon, described it as "the most disgusting incident I can recall in the history of cricket." At the time, underarm deliveries were legal, but as a direct result of the incident, underarm bowling was banned in limited overs cricket by the International Cricket Council as "not within the spirit of the game." The 2000 Laws of Cricket declares that an underarm delivery is illegal unless otherwise agreed before the match.

=== Suspect bowling actions ===
A recently retired cricketer who was greatly embroiled in controversy and under scrutiny from critics over his method of executing deliveries was the Sri Lankan spinner Muttiah Muralitharan. Mike Selvey describes the accusations placed on the bowler in relation to his widely disputed bowling action and delivery, stating the Australian prime minister's reference to the Sri Lankan as a 'chucker.' The controversy linked to Muralitharan's delivery emerged in 1995, when the umpire of the test match between Sri Lanka and Australia deemed Muralitharan's delivery as illegal on the suspicion that he was throwing the ball. Selvey acknowledges this as the factor sparking an 'international cricket incident,' with critics and some extremists going as far as insisting on the exclusion of all of the Sri Lankan's accomplishments throughout his career from the records of cricket. However, Suresh Menon takes an adamant stance on the topic of the controversy surrounding the spinner by displaying appreciation for Muralitharan's actions. Menon suggests that investigation into Muralitharan's deliveries led to the revelation of imperfections present in the bowling action and deliveries of the previously considered 'picture-perfect' fast bowler, Glenn McGrath. This was made possible with the usage of technology and its replacement of the earlier system, which Menon refers to as 'the naked eye.' Eventually, it was declared legal for bowlers to bend their arm fifteen degrees when delivering the ball.

== Comparison to baseball ==
A delivery or ball in cricket is analogous to a pitch in baseball. The word ball in cricket usage does not imply anything about the accuracy of the delivery, unlike baseball's usage of ball to indicate a pitch outside the strike zone. The closest cricket equivalent of a baseball ball is a wide.
