= Saqlain Mushtaq =

Pakistani cricketer (born 1976)

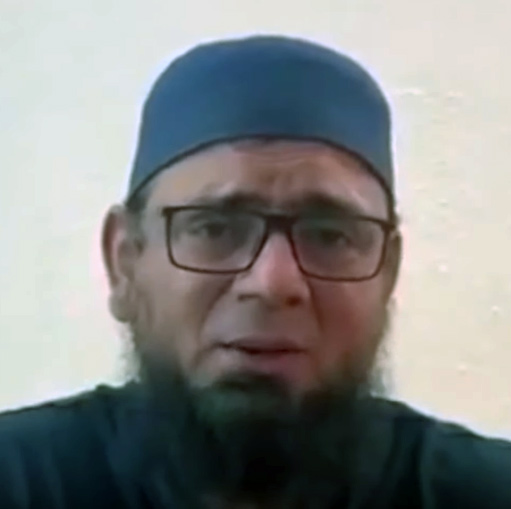
- Mushtaq in 2020

Personal information
- Born: 29 December 1976 (age 49); Lahore, Punjab, Pakistan
- Height: 5 ft 11 in (180 cm)
- Batting: Right-handed
- Bowling: Right arm off break
- Relatives: Shadab Khan (son-in-law)

International information
- National side: Pakistan (1995–2004)
- Test debut (cap 134): 8 September 1995 v Sri Lanka
- Last Test: 1 April 2004 v India
- ODI debut (cap 103): 29 September 1995 v Sri Lanka
- Last ODI: 7 October 2003 v South Africa
- ODI shirt no.: 9

Domestic team information
- Years: Team
- 1994–2004: Pakistan Intl. Airlines
- 1994–1998: Islamabad
- 1997–2008: Surrey
- 2003–2004: Lahore
- 2007: Sussex

Career statistics
Competition	Test	ODI	FC	LA
Matches	49	169	194	323
Runs scored	927	711	3,405	1,339
Batting average	14.48	11.85	16.69	11.64
100s/50s	1/2	0/0	1/14	0/0
Top score	101*	37*	101*	38*
Balls bowled	14,070	8,770	44,634	16,062
Wickets	208	288	833	478
Bowling average	29.83	21.78	23.56	23.55
5 wickets in innings	13	6	60	7
10 wickets in match	3	0	15	0
Best bowling	8/164	5/20	8/65	5/20
Catches/stumpings	15/–	40/–	67/–	80/–
Medal record
Men's Cricket
Representing Pakistan
ICC Cricket World Cup
Runner-up	1999 England-Wales -Ireland-Scotland-Netherlands
- Source: ESPNcricinfo, 8 December 2009

Saqlain Mushtaq (born 29 December 1976) is a Pakistani cricket coach and former international cricketer who was the head coach of the Pakistani national cricket team between 2021 and 2022. He is best known for pioneering the "doosra", a leg break delivery bowled with an off break action. He was the fastest to reach the milestones of 200 and 250 wickets in ODIs. Mushtaq was the first Pakistani to take a hat-trick at a Cricket World Cup, which he did against Zimbabwe during the 1999 tournament.

A right-arm off break bowler, Saqlain played 49 Test matches and 169 One Day Internationals (ODIs) for Pakistan between 1995 and 2004. He took 208 Test and 288 ODI wickets and also scored a Test match century, against New Zealand, in March 2001. Until 2016, Saqlain was the fastest bowler in the history of ODI cricket to take 100 wickets.

== Early life and family ==
Saqlain was born to a government clerk on 29 December 1976, in Lahore into a Punjabi family. His ancestral home is in village Chali Khoo in Amritsar district of East Punjab, now in India. He has two elder brothers: Sibtain, who also played first-class cricket for Lahore, and Zulqurnain. Saqlain played for Govt. M.A.O. College Lahore for three years and won the championship each year. Saqlain never played cricket at school level, but started playing for Zareef Memorial Cricket Club Second Eleven when he was only 13. He always wanted to be an off-spinner: "I never wanted to be a quick bowler. I was very skinny and never had too much strength in the body." Saqlain was coached by Ahmad Hassan and his brothers at the club level. At the age of 14, he went to the Govt. M.A.O. College Lahore, where he was coached by Mumtaz Akhtar Butt. He played for the college and won the championship for three consecutive years.

Mushtaq is a follower of the Deobandi school of thought of Sunni Islam and has been associated with the Tablighi Jamaat movement. Saqlain Mushtaq married Sana Mushtaq, a British Pakistani, in December 1998. He received his British passport in 2007. His daughter, Malika, is married to Pakistani cricketer Shadab Khan.

== Career ==
=== Domestic career ===
Saqlain started his first-class career in 1994–95 at the age of 17. In his first season, he took 52 wickets and was selected to play for Pakistan A in a one-day tournament at Dhaka. In September 1995, he got international recognition, taking seven wickets for the PCB Patron's Eleven against the visiting Sri Lankans. Former Pakistan captain Wasim Akram said of him that he was "the greatest off-spinner he has seen" and "as aggressive as a fast bowler, not afraid of getting hit, and has this total belief in himself."

Saqlain represented Surrey for eight successive seasons from 1997 to 2004. However, his time was interrupted there and his international career with Pakistan effectively ended in 2004. In August 2005, he played his first match against Bangladesh A after recovering from injury and took 4–87 from 35 overs over two innings. However, that same week, in his return to the County Championship, he conceded 110 off 28 overs against Gloucestershire, taking just one wicket.

In February 2006 he signed for Ireland for the C&G Trophy, along with teammate Abdul Razzaq. Later, in February 2007, Sussex announced that Saqlain had signed a two-year contract with them. His initial requirement was to cover for fellow Pakistanis Mushtaq Ahmed and Rana Naved-ul-Hasan, who were part of Pakistan's World Cup campaign. On 26 September 2007, Saqlain was released by the county on his request. On 8 October 2007, Saqlain was re-signed by Surrey. On 28 October, according to ESPNcricinfo, he was released by Surrey.

In April 2009 he joined Old Whitgiftians CC to play in the Surrey Championship. He took 64 wickets in his first season, including five 5-wicket hauls, to earn Whits promotion to the first division. He was also involved in the youth setup. In 2010, after relocating to Leicestershire, he joined Syston Town Cricket Club, playing in the Everards County League. In late 2010, he was training in Taunton at the facilities of Somerset County Cricket Club, whom he has now joined as a temporary spin-bowling coach for the 2011 Caribbean Twenty20 competition. On 11 April 2013, it was announced that Saqlain would be joining Birmingham League Division Three Side Evesham for the 2013 Season.

=== International career ===
==== Test career ====
Saqlain made his Test debut in September 1995 against Sri Lanka at Arbab Niaz Stadium, Peshawar. He picked up four wickets at an average of 26.75 in the match, and accumulated nine wickets in the series from two Tests. His next remarkable series was against the same team, after which he topped the list of wicket-takers with 14 in two Tests, including nine wickets in the first match of the series. Six months later he took a five-wicket haul against South Africa at Rawalpindi Cricket Stadium—first Test of the home series. In the next home series, against West Indies, he played in the third Test at the National Stadium, Karachi. He took nine wickets for 80 runs, earning him the man-of-the-match award and ensuring Pakistan's clean sweep against the touring side. His next prominent performance was against Zimbabwe at the Gaddafi Stadium, Lahore, where he claimed a five-wicket haul.

The highlight of his Test career came in the away series against India in 1999, where he achieved his first ten-wicket haul in a Test match. He took five-wicket hauls in both innings of the match, In the first Test, with India needing only 17 runs to win, Saqlain effectively sealed Pakistan's win by taking the wicket of Sachin Tendulkar, who had scored 136. In the second Test of the series at the Feroz Shah Kotla Ground, Delhi, he once again took five-wicket hauls in both innings but could not prevent defeat. He ended the series with 20 wickets at an average of 20.15, which earned him the man-of-the-series award.

In November 1999, when Pakistan toured Australia, he took 10 wickets in two Test matches, including six wickets for 46 runs in Hobart. In Pakistan's tour to the West Indies in 2000 he was ineffective, taking only six wickets in five innings, which included five for 121 at Kensington Oval. His career-best bowling in an innings came in November 2000 against England at the Gaddafi Stadium, Lahore, in a match in which he took 8 wickets for 164 runs in the first innings. The performance earned him a man-of-the-match award. He was the highest wicket-taker of the series, accumulating 18 wickets with an average of 23.94. In the 2001–02 season, Saqlain took seven wickets against Bangladesh. In the 2002–03 season, he took 15 wickets against Zimbabwe at their home; averaging 21.53, he was the highest wicket-taker of the series.

Saqlain played 49 Test matches for Pakistan during 1995 and 2004 and accumulated 208 wickets at an average of 29.83. He took 13 five-wicket hauls and three ten-wicket hauls, and his best performance for a match was 10 wickets for 155 runs. As a batsman, he scored 927 runs with the average of 14.48, including a century and two fifties. His highest score in the format was 101 not out against New Zealand at Jade Stadium, Christchurch.

==== One Day International career ====
Saqlain made his One Day International (ODI) debut in September 1995 against Sri Lanka at the Municipal Stadium, Gujranwala. He could not take a wicket, but Pakistan won the match by 9 wickets. His first match-winning performance came against same team in the final match of 1996 Singer Cup. He took 3 wickets in the match. His career-best bowling figures in this format are 5 wickets for 20 runs against England at the Rawalpindi Cricket Stadium, in October 2000. He took five-wicket hauls in ODIs on six occasions. He claimed two hat-tricks, both against Zimbabwe, the first in 1996 and the second in 1999, when he became the first Pakistani to do so at a World Cup.

== Post-retirement ==
=== Coaching career ===
On 28 May 2016, Saqlain Mushtaq was appointed by the ECB as England's spin consultant for the home series against Pakistan.

On 29 October 2016, the ECB decided to use Saqlain's services to prepare England team for the test series against India. On 13 November 2016, it was announced that he would remain with the England team until the end of the third Test in Mohali, after agreeing an extension to his deal with the ECB.

On 6 September 2021, he was appointed the interim head coach of Pakistan national cricket team by PCB after Misbah-ul-Haq's resignation from the post. In February 2022, due to team's excellent performance under him, his contract was extended for a year.

== Playing style ==
Saqlain is credited with the invention of the "doosra", an off-spinner's delivery bowled with an action similar to that of an off-break. However, it spins in the opposite direction (i.e. from the leg side to the off side), confusing batsmen, which makes it an effective weapon. Saqlain became well known for this variation ball, which was integral to his success, although he received criticism for overusing it. Other bowlers like Shoaib Malik, Saeed Ajmal, Muttiah Muralitharan, Ajantha Mendis, Johan Botha and Harbhajan Singh also used this delivery in international cricket.

During his time at Surrey Saqlain worked on developing new deliveries, which he called the "teesra" which means "third one" and the "chotha". He used the teesra in the Indian Cricket League (ICL) while playing for Lahore Badshahs. Russel Arnold of Sri Lanka was the first player to face the teesra. He was also the first batsman to get out from a teesra. However, little else is known about these deliveries. Later, this delivery was used by Saeed Ajmal against England in 2012.

His other variation was the arm ball, which again uses a similar grip to the leg-break, but imparts back-spin instead of side-spin and causes the ball to go straight on.

== Records and achievements ==
- He has taken 13 Test five-wicket hauls with 3 Test tenfers. In ODI, he took seven five-wicket hauls.
- Saqlain was selected as one of the Wisden Cricketers of the Year for 2000.
- A statistical analysis conducted by Wisden in 2003 revealed Saqlain as the all-time greatest ODI spinner, and the sixth-greatest ODI bowler.
- Was the fastest to reach the milestones of 100, 150, 200 and 250 wickets in ODIs.
- He was the first of only two spinners to have taken a hat-trick in an ODI (the other being Abdur Razzak), and the second of only four bowlers to have taken two ODI hat-tricks (Wasim Akram, Chaminda Vaas and Lasith Malinga being the others), the second of which was only the second hat-trick in a World Cup match.
- He holds the record for the most wickets in a calendar year in ODIs-69 wickets in 1997. He is also second in this elite list with 65 wickets in 1996.
