= Flipper ball =

Flipper ball may refer to:

- Flipper (cricket), a particular bowling delivery used in cricket
- Flippa ball, a water polo variant intended for younger and beginner players
