= Corridor of uncertainty =

Critical point on a cricket pitch, inducing batting errors

In the sport of cricket, the corridor of uncertainty is an area where a cricket ball can pitch during a delivery: a narrow line on and just outside a batsman's off stump. The name is derived from the opinion that this is the area in which a batsman struggles most to determine whether to leave the delivery or to play it, to play forward or back, and to attack it or defend it. If a batsman leaves the ball, there is a chance the ball will turn inward and either bowl him or hit him with an increased chance of leg before wicket. If a batsman plays the ball, there is a chance the ball will go to the outside instead, leading to an outside edge that can be caught by the slip fielders or wicketkeeper.

The phrase was popularised by former Yorkshire and England batsman, now commentator, Geoffrey Boycott whilst commentating on England's 1990 tour of the West Indies. But he did not invent the cricketing use of the term that is seen at least from the 1980s.

For instance while describing the Brisbane Test of the 1986–87 Ashes in The Age, Peter Roebuck writes of Graham Dilley bowling "down the corridor of uncertainty" and explains that "this American phrase" is used for "bowling on or outside the offstump". According to Mike Selvey, Dilley in New Zealand a year later, "sent ball after ball relentlessly down the "corridor of uncertainty" just outside the offstump, from which batsmen are drawn into the shot without the security of the leaving option, all to a good length". Some writers attribute the term to Terry Alderman.

The phrase has also been used in other sports commentary. In football it is commonly used to describe a cross or pass which is delivered into the area in front of the goalkeeper and behind the last line of defence. The "uncertainty" in this case comes from the decision which both the last defender and the goalkeeper must make: whether to defend the ball, or leave it to the other player.

"Corridor of uncertainty" is also the name, or part of the name, of several online cricket forums and at least two fanzine-type cricket publications.

== See also ==
- Line and length
