= Teesra =

Type of delivery in cricket

The teesra, also known as the jalebi, is a particular type of delivery by an off-spin bowler in the sport of cricket, which renowned off-spinner Saqlain Mushtaq said he had invented. However, upon closer inspection, the ball is simply an orthodox backspinner, a very common delivery that has been bowled by finger spinners as long as cricket has been played.

The delivery was renamed in the Indian Cricket League by Saqlain Mushtaq. At that time Saqlain played for the Lahore Badshahs. The first person to face the teesra or jalebi was Russel Arnold of Sri Lanka when he was correctly given LBW by the umpire. He was also the first person to get out at the hands of the teesra. He got out the fourth time a teesra had ever been bowled.

The teesra made the news in the build-up to the first Test between England and Pakistan in 2012, when Saeed Ajmal claimed he would introduce the delivery into his repertoire. Saeed Ajmal took a match haul of 10 for 97 and became the fifth bowler to pick up seven leg before wicket dismissals in a match.

== The delivery ==
The delivery is similar to a slider (which is used by a wrist spinner). The ball is held by an off-spinner in his normal action but instead of twisting the arm at the point of the delivery, the bowler simply does roll his fingers down the back of the ball. The delivery looks like it will turn a lot but it doesn't turn at all. This is a good way of deceiving the batsman.

== The name ==
The name teesra is commonly used by Saqlain Mushtaq. It originated from an older delivery, the doosra which meant the "other one" or "second one" in Hindi, and Urdu, Saqlain decided to call it the teesra meaning the "third one". The name jalebi was introduced by commentators as soon as the delivery was bowled. A jalebi is a sweet commonly eaten in Indian subcontinent. However the name "backspinner" is by far the more common name that describes accurately the spin on the ball as it travels through the air.

== Usage ==
So far this delivery had been used for well over a hundred years, but Saqlain stated that the teesra was still a work in progress and that he wanted to hone the delivery so that the batsman became even more confused about where the ball was going to spin to and whether it would spin at all. Saeed Ajmal claimed to have learned this art and used it occasionally in the 2011 World Cup and after.
