= Left-arm unorthodox spin =

Type of spin bowling in cricket

Trajectory of a left-arm unorthodox spin delivery

Left-arm unorthodox spin, also known as slow left-arm wrist spin and chinaman, is a type of spin bowling in the sport of cricket. Left-arm unorthodox spin bowlers use wrist spin to spin the ball and make it deviate from left to right after pitching. The direction of turn is the same as that of a traditional right-handed off spin bowler, although the ball will usually turn more sharply due to the spin being imparted predominantly by the wrist.

Some left-arm unorthodox bowlers also bowl the left-arm equivalent of a googly or a 'wrong'un' and the ball ends up turning from right to left on the pitch, going away from a right-handed batsman as if the bowler were an orthodox left-arm spinner.

== Notable left-arm unorthodox spin bowlers ==
The first cricketer known to bowl the style of delivery was 19th-century South African bowler Charlie Llewellyn. Llewellyn toured North America with Bernard Bosanquet, the originator of the googly delivery, and it is likely that Llewellyn learned the googly-style of delivery from him, bowling it with his left-arm.

Among noted players who have bowled the delivery are Denis Compton, who originally bowled orthodox slow-left arm deliveries but developed left-arm wrist spin, taking most of his 622 first-class wickets using the delivery. Chuck Fleetwood-Smith used the delivery in the 1930s, including in his 10 Test matches. Although better known for fast bowling and orthodox slow left-arm, Garfield Sobers could also use it to good effect. In cricket's modern era, Australian Brad Hogg brought the delivery to wider notice and had one of the most well-disguised wrong'uns. Kuldeep Yadav, who debuted for India in March 2017, bowls left-arm wrist spin, and Paul Adams played 45 Test matches and 24 One-day internationals for South Africa between 1995 and 2004 using the delivery. Michael Bevan and Dave Mohammed are also considered to be "among the better known" bowlers to use the style.

In 2021 The Guardian claimed that Kuldeep, Tabraiz Shamsi of South Africa and the Afghan bowler Noor Ahmad were "probably the foremost left-arm wrist-spinners in world cricket", while in 2022 Michael Rippon was reported as "the first specialist left-arm wristspinner" to play for New Zealand. In the women's game, Kary Chan of Hong Kong and Millie Taylor of England bowl left-arm wrist spin deliveries.

Instances of left-arm unorthodox spinners taking a ten-wicket haul in a Test match are rare. Examples include Chuck Fleetwood-Smith against England in 1936–37, Michael Bevan against the West Indies in 1996–97, and Paul Adams against Bangladesh in 2002–03.

In 2007 CricInfo suggested that left-arm wrist-spin bowlers are uncommon because it is "difficult to control left-arm wrist spin. And [...] the ball coming in to a right-hander is considered less dangerous than the one leaving him". A left-arm wrist spin bowler's standard delivery will turn towards a right-handed batsman, as opposed to a right-arm leg spin bowler who will turn the ball away from them. In 2024 Cameron Ponsonby reiterated this view on The Final Word podcast, stating in jest of the success of Kuldeep Yadav,

"The hardest thing in the world, in this sport, is to bowl wrist spin. The reason why right arm leg spin works and is effective is because it spins the ball away from the bat. That's the positive. The negative side of that is you have less control. [...] What's bad about off spin? You spin the ball into the right-hander. What's good about off spin? You have control. Left arm wrist spin: what's good about it? Nothing, because you spin the ball into the right-hander without control."

== Historical use of the term 'chinaman' ==
Historically the term "chinaman" was sometimes used to describe the googly delivery or other unusual deliveries, whether bowled by right or left-arm bowlers. The left-arm wrist spinner's delivery that is the equivalent of the googly eventually became known as the "chinaman".

The origin of the term is unclear, although it is known to have been in use in Yorkshire during the 1920s and may have been first used in reference to Roy Kilner. (Note: Kilner bowled slow left-arm orthodox deliveries rather than wrist spin. Although it is possible that the term was first used either by Kilner or in reference to his bowling, it was not used by Wisden Cricketers' Almanack in 1924 when he was one of their five Cricketers of the Year or in his 1929 obituary.) It is possible that it is a guarded reference to Charlie Llewellyn, the first left-arm bowler to bowl the equivalent of the googly. (Note: Llewellyn had a white father and a mother who had been born on St Helena. She was described as "black" by historian Rowland Bowen, although it is possible that she was from a Madagascan or Indian background. Andy Carter has suggested that there could be a link between Llewellyn's mixed-race heritage and the use of the term "chinaman".) It is first known to have been used in print in The Guardian in 1926 in reference to the possibility of Yorkshire bowler George Macaulay bowling a googly, (Note: Macaulay was a right-arm bowler who did not bowl wrist spin deliveries.) but the term became more widely used after a Test match between England and West Indies at Old Trafford in 1933. Ellis Achong, a player of Chinese origin who bowled slow left-arm orthodox spin, had Walter Robins stumped off a surprise delivery that spun into the right-hander from outside the off stump. As he walked back to the pavilion, Robins reportedly said to the umpire, "fancy being done by a bloody Chinaman!", leading to the more widespread use of the term.

In 2017, Australian journalist Andrew Wu, who is of Chinese descent, raised concerns about the use of the term as "racially offensive", arguing the term itself "has historically been used in a contemptuous manner to describe the Chinese". Wisden formally changed their wording of the term to slow left-arm wrist-spin in the 2018 edition of the Almanack, describing chinaman as "no longer appropriate". CricInfo followed suit in 2021, noting that although some argued that its use in cricket "was not meant to be derogatory", that its continued use was inappropriate. Some writers continue to use the term. (Note: For example, the term remained in use to describe Kuldeep Yadav in the Hindustan Times and The Indian Express in 2021.)
