= Wrist spin =

Type of spin bowling in cricket

Wrist spin is a type of bowling in the sport of cricket. It refers to the cricket technique and specific hand movements associated with imparting a particular direction of spin to the cricket ball. The other spinning technique, usually used to spin the ball in the opposite direction, is finger spin. Wrist spin is bowled by releasing the ball from the back of the hand, so that it passes over the little finger. Done by a right-handed bowler, this imparts an anticlockwise rotation to the ball, as seen from the bowler's perspective; a left-handed wrist spinner rotates the ball clockwise.

The name wrist spin is actually something of a misnomer, as the wrist is not a vital part of the mechanism for producing the characteristic spin on the ball. A wrist spin delivery is released with the arm held in a fully pronated position, with the fingers on the inside of the ball (to the left for a right-handed bowler). If this pronated position is maintained through the release, the fingers will naturally cut down the side of the ball and produce an anti-clockwise spin. The great Australian leg-spinner Bill O'Reilly is famous for bowling legspin in this manner. Additional spin may be put on the ball through two other means: the active pronation of the arm from an initially supinated position just before the ball is released, and the extension of the wrist at the moment of release. Both techniques increase the effect of the cutting mechanism. The slower a spin bowler delivers the ball, the more actively he must attempt to impart spin onto it in order to maintain the same rate of revolution.

Although the biomechanical details of wrist spin are the same for right and left handed bowlers, such bowlers are often discussed separately, as the direction in which the ball deviates as it bounces on the cricket pitch is different:

- Right-handed wrist spin is more commonly known as leg spin.
- Left-handed wrist spin is more commonly known as left-arm unorthodox spin or simply wrist spin.

== Types of delivery ==
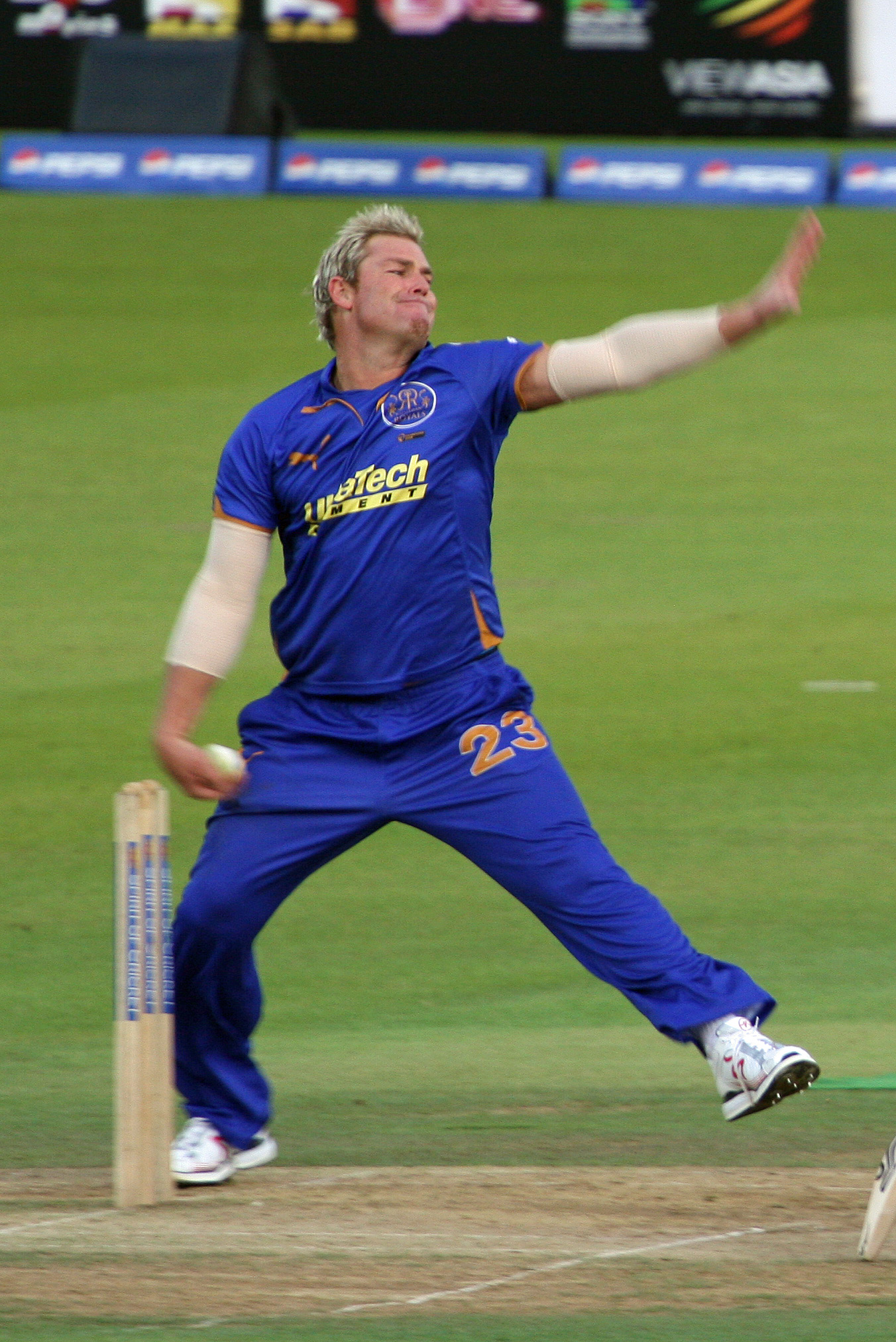
Shane Warne bowling a leg spin delivery

=== Leg break ===
To grip the ball for a leg-spinning delivery, the ball is placed into the palm with the seam parallel to the palm. The first two fingers then spread and grip the ball, and the third and fourth fingers close together and rest against the side of the ball. The first bend of the third finger should grasp the seam. The thumb resting against the side is up to the bowler, but should impart no pressure. When the ball is bowled, the third finger will apply most of the spin. The wrist is cocked as it comes down by the hip, and the wrist moves sharply from right to left as the ball is released, adding more spin. The ball is thrown up to provide flight. The batsman will see the hand with the palm facing towards them when the ball is released.

=== Wrong'un ===
A wrong'un or googly is a type of delivery bowled by a wrist spin bowler. It is occasionally referred to as a Bosie, an eponym in honour of its inventor Bernard Bosanquet.

While a normal leg break spins from the leg to the off side, away from a right-handed batsman, a googly spins the other way, from off to leg, into a right-handed batsman (and is distinct from an off break delivery). The bowler achieves this change of spin by bending the wrist sharply from the normal leg break delivery position. To achieve this bend requires maximal pronation of the forearm prior to delivery, as well as inward rotation of the shoulder: the tip of the elbow, which would normally face the right of a right-hand bowler at the point of delivery, faces upward, and the back of the hand, which would normally face the rear of the bowler, faces the front. When the Cricket ball rolls out of the hand (from the side near the little finger, as in a normal leg break), it emerges with clockwise spin (from the bowler's point of view). A googly may also be achieved by bowling the ball as a conventional leg break, but spinning the ball further with the fingers just before it is released.

The change of wrist action can be seen by a skilled batsman and the change of spin allowed for when playing a shot at the ball. Less skilled batsmen, or ones who have lost their concentration, can be deceived completely, expecting the ball to move one direction off the pitch, only for it to move the other direction. If the batsman is expecting a leg break, he will play outside the line of the ball after it spins. This means the ball can either strike the pads for a potential LBW appeal, or may fly between the bat and the pads and hit the wicket.

The googly is a major weapon in the arsenal of a leg spin bowler, and can be one of the bowler's most effective wicket-taking balls. It is used infrequently, because its effectiveness comes mostly from its surprise value. The grip is identical to that of a conventional leg-break: the only difference is the additional wrist and shoulder rotation, so that the batsman will see the back of the hand when the ball is released.

=== Topspinner ===
A topspinner is a type of delivery bowled by a cricketer bowling either wrist spin or finger spin. In either case, the bowler imparts the ball with top spin by twisting it with his or her fingers prior to delivery. In both cases, the topspinner is the halfway house between the stock delivery and the wrong'un – in the wrist spinner's case his googly, and in the finger spinner's case his doosra.

A topspinning cricket ball behaves similarly to top spin shots in tennis or table tennis. The forward spinning motion impedes air travelling over the ball, but assists air travelling underneath. The difference in air pressure above and underneath the ball (described as the Magnus effect) acts as a downward force, meaning that the ball falls earlier and faster than normal.

In cricketing terms, this means that the ball drops shorter, falls faster and bounces higher than might otherwise be anticipated by the batsman. These properties are summed up in cricketing terms as a "looping" or "loopy" delivery. Also, the ball travels straight on, as compared to a wrist spin or finger spin stock delivery that breaks to the left or right on impact. A batsman may easily be deceived by the ball, particularly given that the action is quite similar to the stock delivery.

In delivery, the topspinner is gripped like a normal side spinner. For a legspinner the back of the hand faces the cover region and the palm of the hand faces the mid wicket region at release. For an offspiner, these directions are reversed. The ball is then released either with the seam going straight on to the batsman, or with a scrambled seam. A spinner will frequently bowl deliveries with both top spin and side spin. A ball presenting with roughly equal amounts of both is usually called an "overspinning" leg break or off break.

Tactically, a bowler will bowl topspinners to draw a batsman forward before using the dip and extra bounce to deceive them. In particular, batsmen looking to sweep or drive are vulnerable as the bounce can defeat them.

=== Slider ===
A slider is a type of delivery bowled by a wrist spin bowler. Whereas a topspinner is released with the thumb facing the batsman, a slider is bowled with the thumb facing the bowler. On release the wrist and ring finger work to impart backspin to the ball. A topspinner tends to dip more quickly and bounce higher than a normal delivery. The slider does the opposite: it floats to a fuller length and bounces less than the batsman might expect. The classic slider heads with its seam aligned towards the batsman and may tend to swing in slightly. Sliders may also head towards the batsman with a scrambled seam (with the ball not spinning in the direction of the seam, so the seam direction is not constant, unlike in conventional spin bowling). This has less effect on the flight and bounce but absence of leg spin may deceive the batsman.

It is claimed that Shane Warne invented this type of delivery. However, this is inaccurate. The Australian spinner Peter Philpott used the technique in the 1960s, calling it simply an orthodox backspinner, while Australian allrounder and captain Richie Benaud used what he called his 'sliding topspinner' which appears again to have been similar. Since he was taught the technique by Doug Ring, it may be more accurate to suggest that Ring is the originator. Either that, or the ball is one of those deliveries with no easily identifiable point of origin.

Although there is often a good deal of confusion on the subject, the slider is thought to be more or less an identical delivery to the "zooter".

=== Flipper ===
The flipper is a particular bowling delivery used in cricket, generally by a leg spin bowler. In essence it is a back spin ball. Squeezed out of the front of the hand with the thumb and first and second fingers, it keeps deceptively low after pitching and can accordingly be very difficult to play. The flipper is comparable to a riseball in slow-pitch softball.

By putting backspin on the ball the Magnus effect results in air travelling over the top of the ball quickly and cleanly whilst air travelling under the ball is turbulent. The lift produced means that the ball drops slower and travels further than a normal delivery. The slower descent also results in the ball bouncing lower.

The flipper is bowled on the opposite side to a slider, much in the same way that the top-spinner is bowled. On release, the bowler 'pinches' or clicks the thumb and forefinger, causing the ball to come out underneath the hand. There must be sufficient tension in the wrist and fingers to impart a good helping of backspin or underspin. In doing so the flipper will float on towards the batsman and land on a fuller length than he anticipated, often leaving him caught on the back foot when he wrongly assumes it to be a pullable or a cuttable ball. The back spin or underspin will cause the ball to hurry on at great pace with very little bounce, though this may be harder to achieve on softer wickets. A series of normal leg spinners or topspinners, with their dropping looping flight, will have the batsman used to the ball pitching on a shorter length. The batsman may wrongly assume that the flipper will drop and loop like a normal overspinning delivery, resulting in the ball pitching under the bat and going on to either hit the stumps or result in leg before wicket.

Much of the effectiveness of the flipper is attributable to the "pop", that is, the extra pace and change in trajectory that is imparted to the ball when it is squeezed out of the bowler's hand. Occasionally, the term 'flipper' has been used to describe other types of deliveries. The Australian leg spinner Bob Holland employed a back spinning ball that he simply pushed backwards with the heel of his palm. Sometimes this form of front-hand flipper is called a 'zooter'. It is easier to bowl but not as effective as the amount of backspin is much less.
