= Leg spin =

Type of spin bowling in cricket

A leg spin or leg break delivery bowled from over the wicket.

A leg spin or leg break delivery bowled from around the wicket.

Leg spin is a type of spin bowling in cricket. A bowler who uses this technique is called a leg spinner. Leg spinners bowl with their right-arm and a wrist spin action. The leg spinner's normal delivery is called a leg break, which spins from right to left (from the bowler's perspective) when the ball bounces on the pitch. For a right-handed batter, the ball breaks towards them from the leg side, hence the name 'leg break'.

Leg spinners bowl mostly leg breaks, varying them by adjusting the line and length, and amount of side spin versus topspin of the deliveries. Leg spinners also typically use variations of flight by sometimes looping the ball in the air, allowing any cross-breeze and the aerodynamic effects of the spinning ball to cause the ball to dip and drift before bouncing and spinning or "turning", sharply. Leg spinners also bowl other types of delivery, which spin differently, such as the googly.

The terms 'leg spin', 'leg spinner', 'leg break' and 'leggie' are used in slightly different ways by different sources.

The bowlers with the second- and fourth-highest number of wickets in the history of Test cricket, Shane Warne and Anil Kumble, respectively, were leg spinners.

== History ==
In the 1970s and 1980s, it was thought that leg spin would disappear from the game due to the success of West Indian, and later Australian teams, exclusively using fast bowlers. During this time Abdul Qadir of Pakistan was the highest-profile leg spinner in the world and is sometimes credited with "keeping the art alive". However, leg spin become popular again with cricket fans and a successful part of cricket teams, driven largely by the success of Shane Warne, beginning with his spectacular Ball of the Century to Mike Gatting in 1993.

== Comparison with other types of bowling ==
A left-handed bowler who bowls with the same (wrist spin) action as a leg spinner is known as a left-arm unorthodox spin bowler. The ball itself spins in the opposite direction.It is also referred to as Chinaman bowling but is not used more due to racial connotation.

The same kind of trajectory, which spins from right to left on pitching, when performed by a left-arm bowler is known as left-arm orthodox spin bowling.

As with all spinners, leg spinners bowl the ball far more slowly (70–90 km/h or 45–55 mph) than fast bowlers. The fastest leg spinners will sometimes top 100 km/h (60 mph). While very difficult to bowl accurately, good leg spin is considered one of the most threatening types of bowling to bat against for a right-handed batter, since the flight and sharp turn make the ball's movement extremely hard to read, and the turn away from the right-handed batter is more dangerous than the turn into the right-handed batter generated by an off spinner. Any miscalculation can result in an outside edge off the bat and a catch going to the wicket-keeper or slip fielders. Alternatively, for a ball aimed outside the leg stump, the breaking may be so sharp that the ball goes behind a right-handed batter and hits the stumps – the batter is then said (informally) to be "bowled around their legs". A left-handed batter has less difficulty facing leg spin bowling, because the ball moves in towards the batter's body, meaning the batter's legs are usually in the path of the ball if it misses the bat or takes an edge. This makes it difficult for the bowler to get the batter out bowled or caught from a leg break.

Leg spin: Some sources make the term 'leg spin' synonymous with leg break, implying that other deliveries bowled by a leg spinner do not count as 'leg spin'. However, other sources use the term 'leg spin' more widely, to include all deliveries bowled by a leg spinner, including non-leg break deliveries.

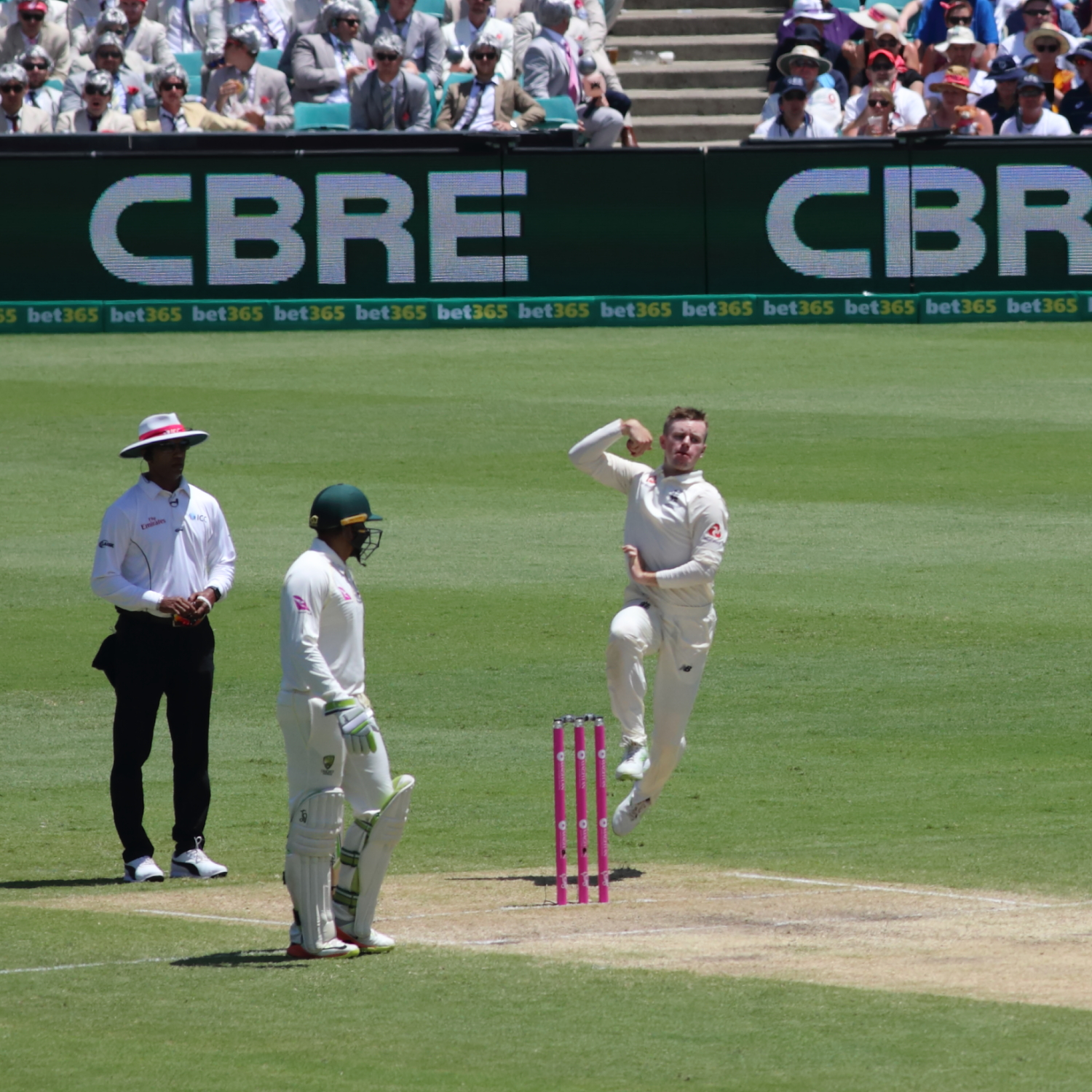
Mason Crane bowling a leg break during the 2017–18 Ashes series

Leg break: In the definition of a leg break, some sources actually include the bowler being a leg spinner, which implies that only leg spinners can bowl leg breaks; all leg breaks are bowled by leg spinners. Other sources do not include the bowler being a leg spinner in the definition of a leg break, and say a leg break is simply a delivery that spins from the legside to the offside, and so can also be bowled by other types of bowler. In this case, leg breaks are (only) mostly bowled by leg spinners.

Leg spinner: The term leg spinner can be used to mean either the bowler or the leg break delivery.

Leggie: The term leggie can also be used to mean either the bowler or the leg break delivery.

== Technique ==
A leg break is bowled by holding the cricket ball in the palm of the hand with the seam running across under all the fingers. As the ball is released, the wrist is rotated to the left and the ball flicked by the ring finger, giving the ball an anti-clockwise spin as seen from behind.

To grip the ball for a leg-spinning delivery, the ball is placed into the palm with the seam parallel to the palm. The first two fingers then spread and grip the ball, and the third and fourth fingers close together and rest against the side of the ball. The first bend of the third finger should grasp the seam. The thumb resting against the side is up to the bowler but should impart no pressure. When the ball is bowled, the third finger will apply most of the spin. The wrist is cocked as it comes down by the hip, and the wrist moves sharply from right to left as the ball is released, adding more spin. The ball is tossed up to provide flight. The batter will see the hand with the palm facing towards them when the ball is released.

== Notable leg spin bowlers ==
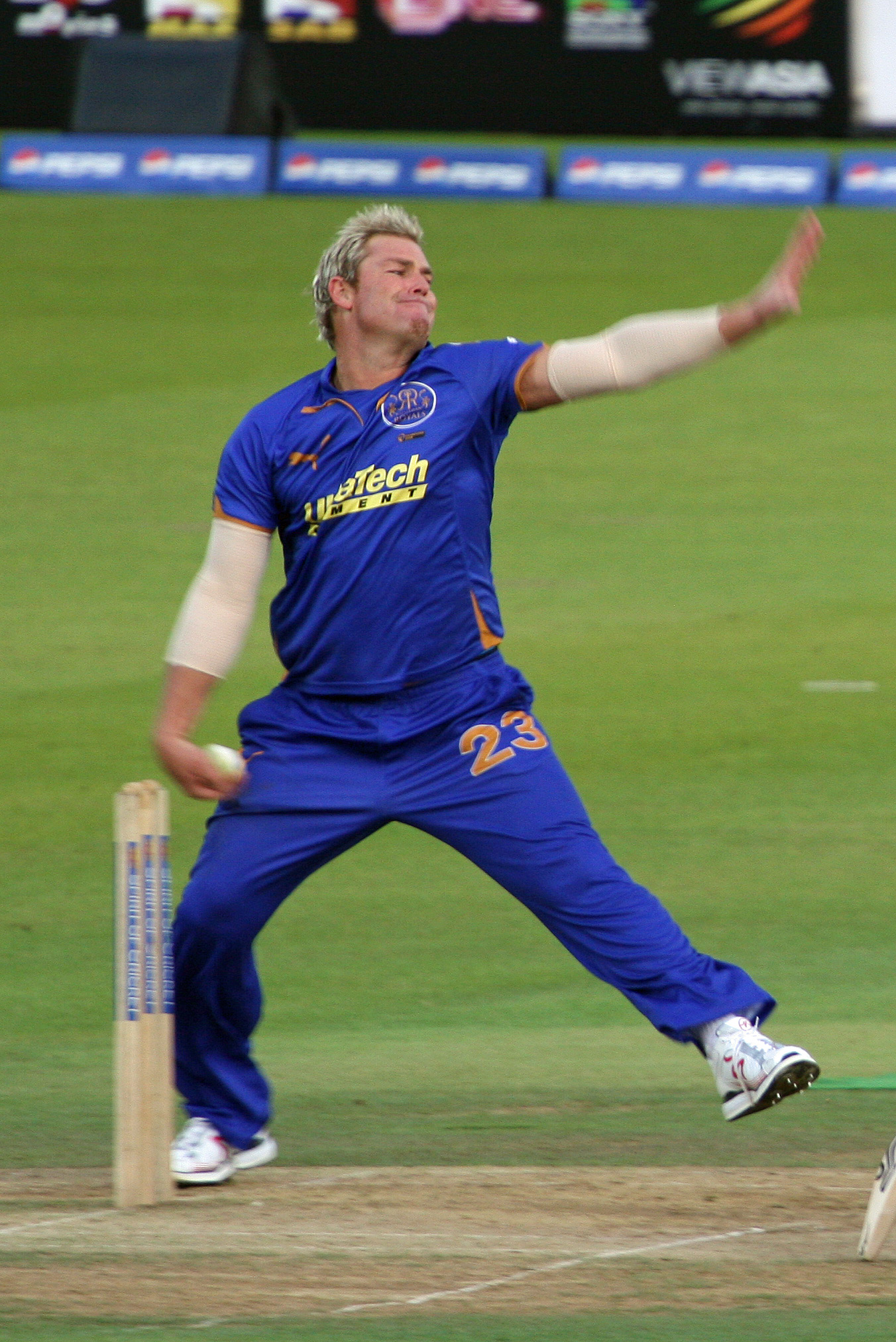
Shane Warne bowling a leg spin delivery

Players listed below have been included as they meet specific criteria which the general cricketing public would recognise as having achieved significant success in the art of leg spin bowling. For example: leading wicket-takers, and inventors of new deliveries.

- Shane Warne – 708 Test wickets (second all-time), one of five Wisden Cricketers of the Century
- Bernard Bosanquet – credited with inventing the googly (also known as the "Bosie" in Australia)
- Robin Hobbs – the last English leg spin bowler to take 1,000 first-class wickets in his career. In all he took 1,099 with a best of 8 for 63 at an average of 27.09.
- B. S. Chandrasekhar – took 16 five-wicket hauls
- Clarrie Grimmett – 216 Test wickets
- Anil Kumble – 619 Test wickets (currently 4th on the list of all-time Test cricket wicket takers), best bowling in an innings of 10/74
- Abdul Qadir – took 10 wickets in a Test match on five occasions
- Tich Freeman - 3776 first-class wickets, the second of all time and the most of any leg spin bowler. He played his last Test match from 17 to 20 August 1929, against South Africa at The Oval.
- Alana King - first woman to take seven wickets in a single World Cup game (ODI)

== Other deliveries bowled by leg spin bowlers ==
Highly skilled leg spin bowlers are also able to bowl deliveries that behave unexpectedly, including the googly, which turns the opposite way to a normal leg break and the top spinner, which does not turn but dips sharply and bounces higher than other deliveries. A few leg spinners such as Abdul Qadir, Anil Kumble, Shane Warne and Mushtaq Ahmed have also mastered the flipper, a delivery that, like a top spinner, goes straight on landing; but having floated through the air it skids and keeps low, often dismissing batters leg before wicket or bowled. Another variation in the arsenal of some leg spinners is the slider, which travels more straight on.

== See also ==
- Off break
