= Off spin =

Type of bowling in cricket

Animation of a typical off spin delivery, bowled from over the wicket

Off spin is a type of spin bowling in cricket. A bowler who uses this technique is called an off spinner. Off spinners bowl with their right-arm and a finger spin action. Their normal delivery is called an off break, which spins from left to right (from the bowler's perspective) when the ball bounces on the pitch. For a right-handed batsman, the ball breaks towards them from the off side, hence the name 'off break'.

Off spinners bowl mostly off breaks, varying them by adjusting the line and length of the deliveries. Off spinners also bowl other types of delivery, which spin differently. Aside from these variations in spin, varying the speed, length and flight of the ball are also important for the off spinner.

The bowler with the most wickets in the history of both Test matches and ODIs, Muttiah Muralitharan, was an off spinner.

== History ==
Although rare now, in the past there were bowlers who used the off-break action who deliberately did not impart any considerable spin on the ball but relied on line and length (or even speed variations) to frustrate batters. They endeavoured to pitch the ball in an area that the batter was unable to play a scoring shot, even making last moment adjustments to "follow" a batter should they move within the crease to negate the bowlers tactics. Whilst this is primarily a defensive style, wickets were achieved by forcing a batsman to make a rash stroke or even bowling at the stumps instead of the retreating batter. Another wicket taking method was to impart more spin on the ball than usual, and surprise the batsman. An exponent of this style of bowling was "Flat" Jack Simmons who played for Lancashire and Tasmania in the 1970s and 1980s. With the advent of limited overs cricket promoting more adventurous batting styles and the use of ever heavier bats this style of bowling has declined, although some off-spinners will still use this tactic when the pitch is offering very little or no turn. It is a tactic often used by Kane Williamson when he bowls occasionally in limited overs format because his bowling style tends to be flatter and faster.

== Comparison with other types of spin bowling ==
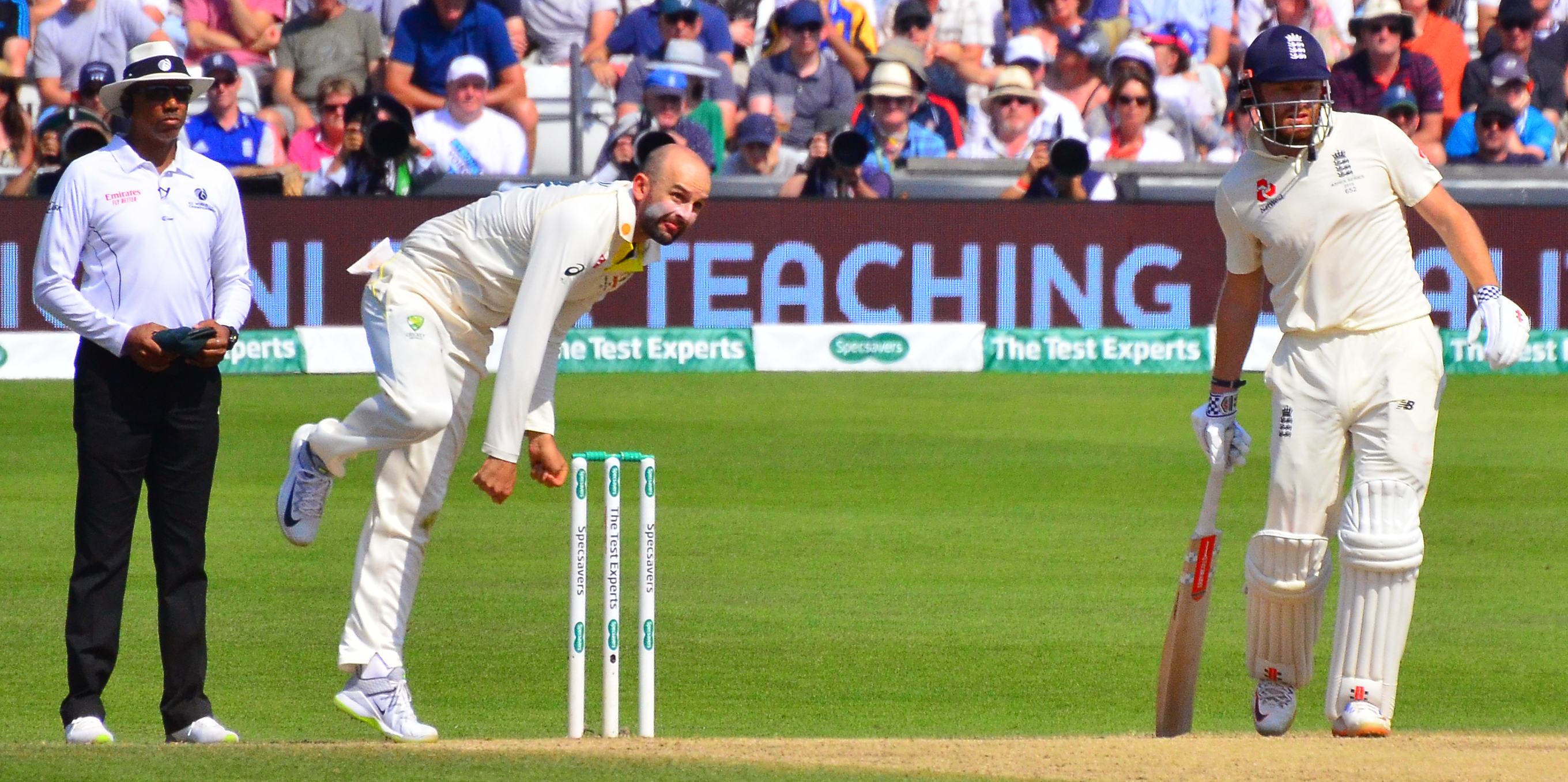
Nathan Lyon bowling off spin

Off spin contrasts with leg spin, in which the ball spins from leg to off and which is bowled with a very different action (wrist spin). Off spin is generally considered less difficult to play than leg spin, as off breaks typically spin less than leg breaks, and do not generally possess the same loopy, potentially deceptive flight. In addition, off spinners tend to have a smaller repertoire of deliveries to choose from. For a right-handed batter, the ball moves in towards the batter's body, meaning the batter's legs are usually in the path of the ball if it misses the bat or takes an edge. This makes it difficult for the bowler to get the batter out bowled or caught from an off break, but it does mean there is a chance of leg before wicket, assuming the ball has not turned enough to miss the leg stump. However, the off spinner often bowls faster and more accurately than a leg spinner, and can therefore deceive the batter with changes in the pace of the ball. A left-handed batter has more difficulty facing off break bowling, because the ball moves away from their body. This means that any miscalculation can more easily result in an outside edge off the bat and a catch going to the wicket-keeper or slips fielders.

A left-handed bowler who bowls with the same (finger spin) action as an off spinner is known as a left-arm orthodox spin bowler. While the orthodox spinner has the same action as an off-spinner, the ball itself spins in the opposite direction (akin to a right arm leg spinner). Such a ball is not normally called an off break, but a left-arm orthodox spinner.

== Terminology ==
Off spin: Sometimes the term off spin is used to mean the off break delivery. At other times the term off spin has a wider meaning, to include all deliveries bowled by an off spinner, including non-off break deliveries.

Off spinner: The term off spinner can be used to mean either the bowler or the off break delivery.

Offie: The term offie can also be used to mean either the bowler or the off break delivery.

== Technique ==
An off break is bowled by holding the cricket ball in the palm of the hand with the seam running across under all the fingers. As the ball is released, the fingers roll down the right side of the ball (for a right-handed bowler), giving the ball a clockwise spin as seen from behind.

== Notable off spinners ==
Notable off spinners include:

- Muttiah Muralitharan of Sri Lanka, who has the most wickets in both ODIs and Test matches,
- E. A. S. Prasanna and Srinivas Venkataraghavan, two of the legendary Indian spin quartet
- Harbhajan Singh of India
- Saqlain Mushtaq and Saeed Ajmal of Pakistan. Saqlain Mushtaq was credited with the invention of the "doosra", which is bowled with a similar-looking action to the off break but spins the opposite way, just as the leg spinner's googly turns the opposite way from his stock ball.
- Jim Laker and Graeme Swann of England
- Nathan Lyon of Australia.
- Tim May of Australia. He played 24 tests as well as being the Chief Executive of the Australian Cricketers' Association and later the Federation of International Cricketers' Associations.
- Ajantha Mendis: inventor of the carrom ball
- Lance Gibbs: first spinner to pass 300 wickets
- Ravichandran Ashwin of India. Fastest Bowler to reach 250, 300 and 350 wickets in test cricket.
- Sunil Narine of West Indies.

== Other deliveries bowled by off spin bowlers ==
Another common weapon of the off spinner is the arm ball, which does not spin but goes straight on "with the arm". More skilled off-spinners also have the topspinner.

== See also ==
- Cricket terminology
- Arm ball
- Doosra
- Leg break
