= Flight (cricket) =

Cricket terminology

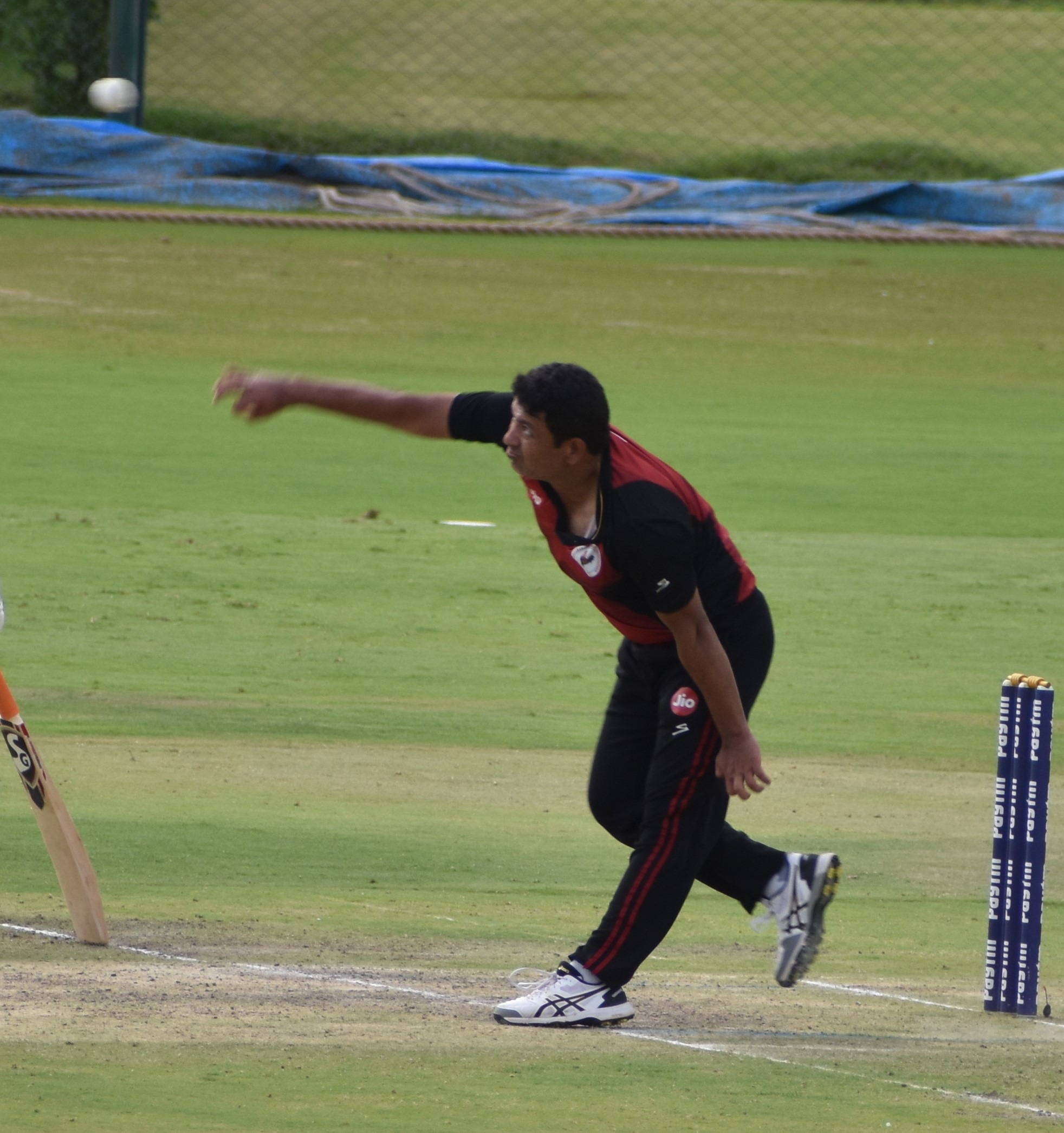
Piyush Chawla has 'flighted' the ball considerably.

In cricket, the flight of the ball is its trajectory through the air between being released by the bowler and bouncing on the pitch. The flight of a delivery may be varied by changing the pace of the ball or through use of the Magnus force.

Flight is a key weapon of spin bowlers. A common objective of spin bowling is to beat the batsman "in the flight". This implies that the bowler has deliberately varied the trajectory of the ball in order to deceive the batsman as to the exact location it will land. This may result in the batsman missing or mis-hitting the ball and thus being dismissed.

If the bowler bowls the ball slightly slower or with topspin, then the ball will land further away from the batsman that he would otherwise anticipate, whereas if the bowler bowls the ball slightly quicker or with backspin, then the ball will land closer to the batsman. Applying a lateral Magnus force will make the ball move sideways in the air, this is known as drift.

The term "flighted delivery" or flighting is often used to describe a delivery that is bowled slightly slower with a higher trajectory. This is seen as an aggressive tactic for spin bowlers.

A quicker delivery with a lower trajectory is sometimes described as "flat" or "flatter". In one-day cricket, spinners will often "push through" flatter deliveries, as they are perceived as more difficult to strike for boundaries by aggressive batsmen.

== See also ==
- Bouncing ball
