= Spin bowling =

Bowling technique in cricket

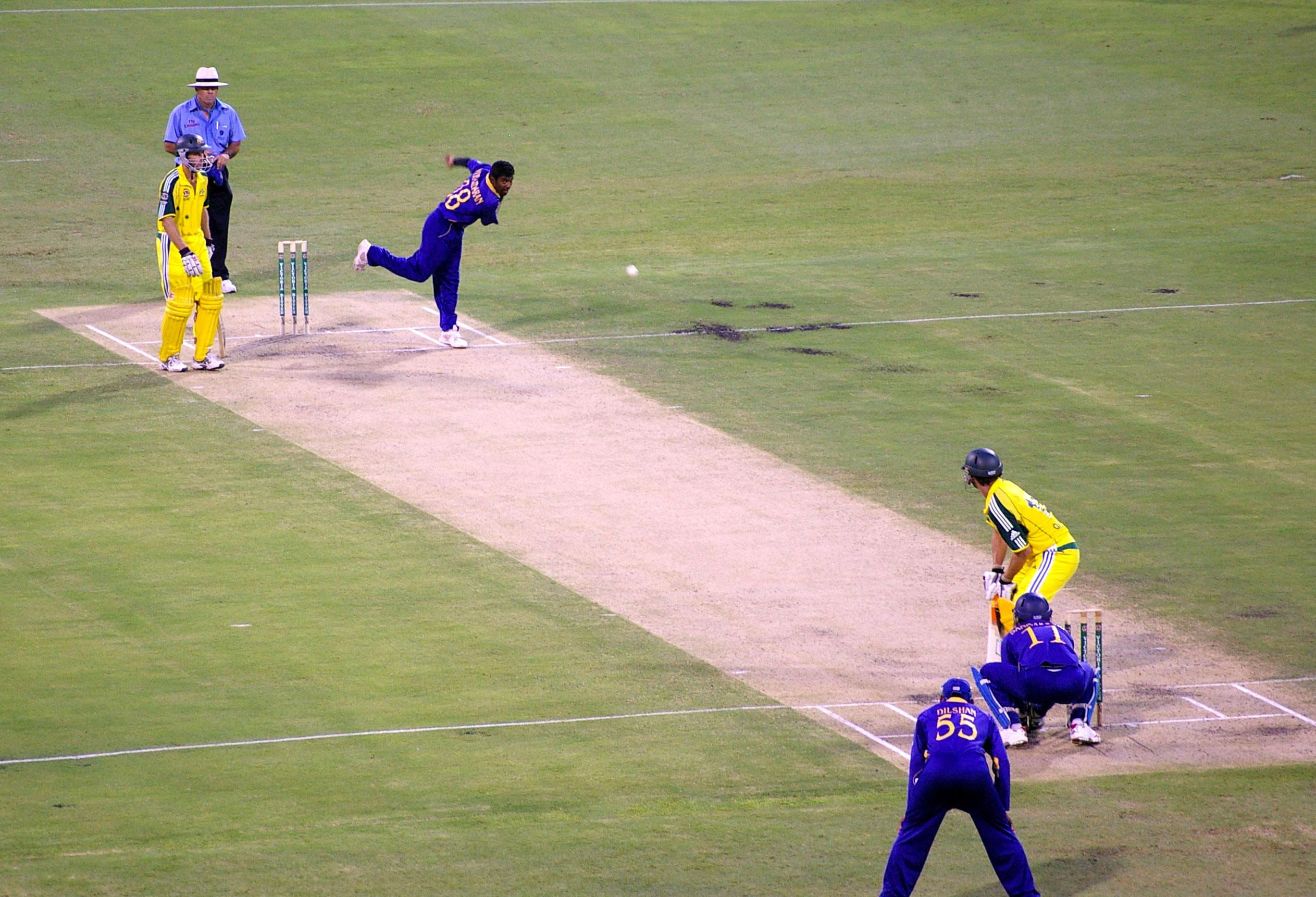
Spin bowler Muttiah Muralitharan bowling to the batsman, Adam Gilchrist

Spin bowling is a bowling technique in cricket, in which the ball is delivered relatively slowly but with rapid rotation, giving it the potential to deviate sharply after bouncing. A bowler who uses this technique is called a spinner, a spin bowler, or a slow bowler.

It is one of the two main approaches to bowling, the other being fast bowling.

A spinner may bowl with their right-arm or left-arm, and with a finger spin or wrist spin action. Therefore, there are four types of spin bowling: off spin, leg spin, left-arm orthodox spin and left-arm unorthodox spin.

The bowlers with the highest, second-highest and fourth-highest number of wickets in the history of Test cricket, Muttiah Muralitharan, Shane Warne and Anil Kumble, respectively, were spinners.

== Purpose ==
The main aim of spin bowling is to bowl the cricket ball with rapid rotation so that when it bounces on the pitch it will deviate from its normal straight path, thus making it difficult for the batsman to hit the ball cleanly. The speed the ball travels is not critical, and is significantly slower than that for fast bowling. A typical spin delivery has a speed in the range 70–90 km/h (45–55 mph).

== Techniques ==
An off-spin delivery by (right arm over the wicket)

A leg-spin delivery by (right arm over the wicket)

Spin bowling is divided into four categories, depending on the physical technique used. There is virtually no overlap between the two basic biomechanical techniques of wrist spin and finger spin.

Category	Left arm or right arm	Finger spin or wrist spin	Direction of spin of normal delivery	Notable bowlers
Off spin	Right	Finger	Left to right	Jim Laker, Muttiah Muralitharan, Saqlain Mushtaq, Nathan Lyon, Harbhajan Singh, Ravichandran Ashwin, Graeme Swann, Saeed Ajmal
Left-arm orthodox spin	Left	Finger	Right to left	Phil Tufnell, Ravindra Jadeja, Daniel Vettori, Mitchell Santner, Rangana Herath, Monty Panesar, Keshav Maharaj, Shakib Al Hasan, Derek Underwood, Bishan Singh Bedi
Leg spin	Right	Wrist	Right to left	Abdul Qadir, Anil Kumble, Shane Warne, Mushtaq Ahmed, Shahid Afridi, Adil Rashid, Yuzvendra Chahal, Adam Zampa, Devendra Bishoo
Left-arm unorthodox spin	Left	Wrist	Left to right	Kuldeep Yadav, Brad Hogg, Paul Adams, Chuck Fleetwood-Smith, Tabraiz Shamsi

Depending on technique, a spin bowler uses either predominant wrist or finger motion to impart spin to the ball around a horizontal axis that is at an oblique angle to the length of the pitch. This sort of spin means it is also possible for the Magnus effect to cause the ball to deviate sideways through the air, before it bounces. Such deviation is called drift. The combination of drift and spin can make the ball's trajectory complex, with a change of direction at the bounce.

Spin bowlers are generally given the task of bowling with an old, worn cricket ball. A new cricket ball better suits the techniques of fast bowling than spin bowling, while a worn one grips the pitch better and achieves greater spin. Spin bowlers are also more effective later in a game, as the pitch dries up and begins to crack and crumble. This again provides more purchase for the spinning ball and produces greater deviation. Spin bowlers that open the bowling are rare, but became a more viable option with the introduction of Twenty20 cricket when pitch conditions are in their favour, and the ball also generally drifts more in the air. Spin bowlers can also be used tactically in shorter forms of the game, to 'take the pace off the ball'. This strategy is especially effective to slow down the scoring rates of batsmen who specialise in making use of the pace of faster bowlers to score runs quickly. The lower inherent momentum of a spin bowler necessitates more power exerted by the batsman to achieve the same results.

== Equivalences ==
Both finger spin and wrist spin bowlers use a range of different angles of spin to confuse the batsman and dismiss them. Many of these variations have direct equivalents in the other discipline, but the names used for the various deliveries may be different.

Analogous concepts and terminology
Description	Finger spin	Wrist spin
A delivery in which the ball spins towards the batsman to produce dip and bounce.	topspinner	topspinner
A delivery in which the ball spins in the opposite direction to the stock delivery.	doosra (a.k.a. the other one)	googly (a.k.a. wrong 'un or bosey)
A delivery in which the ball spins away from the batsmen, scrambled seam.	slider	slider
A delivery in which the ball spins away from the batsmen, seam upright to produce swing.	arm ball	also the slider – rarely used
A delivery in which the ball is squeezed out of the fingers with backspin.	zooter	flipper
A delivery in which the ball spins horizontally on its axis to produce drift but no turn.	undercutter	no real equivalent

== Conditions ==
Spin bowling has become a forte of bowlers from South Asia. The primary reason for this is that pitches in the sub-continent provide more help to spin bowlers. The faster the pitch degenerates, the earlier the spinners come into the picture. Australian and South African pitches are usually very hard and bouncy, helping the fast bowlers more. They do not break up very much during the match. In contrast, pitches in the sub-continent are not that hard. They are not usually held together by the grass as much; hence they break up more quickly and help spin bowlers.

In addition to this, spin bowling is considered to be less tiring than pace bowling as it generally does not employ a lengthy run up. Therefore, spin bowling is more prevalent in the hot and humid conditions of the sub-continent as a form of energy conservation, especially in multi-day competitions.

In general, leg-spin is considered to be one of the toughest types of bowling in which to keep control of the ball, but it is very effective in picking off wickets.

== Flight, turn, bounce, drift, dip ==
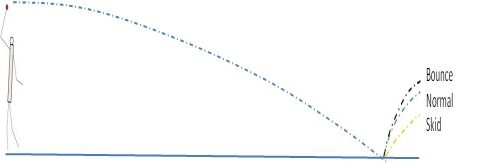
Bounce

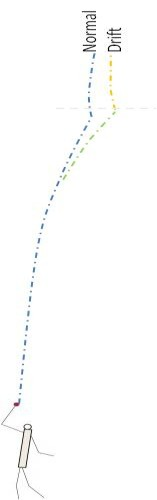
Drift

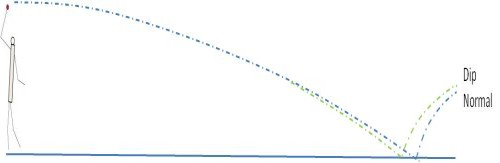
Dip

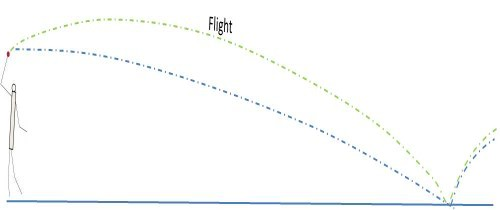
Flight

It is customary among cricket commentators to describe and judge the quality of spin bowling in terms of the characteristics flight, turn, bounce, drift, and dip. All these are arts to deceive the batsman and require much practice. The basic trajectory of spin bowling is two-lines-at-an-angle, but the above characteristics (described below) modify this 'normal' trajectory into more complex shapes.

Turn: How much the ball turns after pitching (e.g. 5 degree deviation after meeting the ground). It depends on the number and direction of revolutions of the ball. The movement and rotation of the ball varies, depending on the position of the wrist and the finger. An occasional unexpected straight ball can usefully be included in an attack, but spin variation is the main technique used to deceive the batsman and take wickets. A high rate of turn is above 33 rev/second, or 2000 rpm. Graeme Swann consistently spun over 2000 rpm, the most amongst English spinners until Liam Dawson topped 35 rev/second, or 2100 rpm. Also, the slower the ball, the more it tends to deviate. For an offspinner, you will have to bowl from wide of off-stump to get the ball to turn into the right-handed batsman and force them to nick off the edge to a fielder or into the top of off stump.

Bounce: Getting the ball to bounce more than normal, so that the ball meets the batsman at a greater height than expected. Sometimes, if the ball spins horizontally (e.g. a slider), the batsman will not be able to make contact with the ball and it may hit the stumps before the second bounce.

Drift: Getting the ball to move sideways while in air. Late drift causes the batsman to cover the wrong line and the ball may catch the edge of the bat.

Dip: Getting the ball to pitch (meet the ground) at a shorter distance than normal. Late dip causes the batsman to misjudge the length of the ball.

Flight: throwing the ball up a bit more than normal, so that its time in the air before pitching is longer. A slow ball with extra flight may deceive the batsman into thinking it is slower than it is and therefore mistiming his shot. This is very effective for offspinners. Usually a spin bowler relies on tricks during flight to produce turn, bounce, drift and dip, or combinations of them.

== Bibliography ==
- Surya Prakash Chaturvedi,Bharat Ki Spin Parampara, Rajkamal Prakashan, 2007 (this book available only in Hindi)
- Barclays World of Cricket, 3rd edition (ed. E W Swanton), Willow Books, 1986.
- Julian Knight, Cricket for Dummies, John Wiley and Sons, 2006
