= Arm ball =

Type of delivery in cricket

An arm ball is a type of delivery in cricket. It is a variation delivery bowled by an off spin bowler or slow left-arm orthodox bowler. It is the finger spin equivalent of a wrist spinner's slider or zooter.

In contrast to the stock delivery, an arm ball is delivered by rolling the fingers down the back of the ball on release. This puts backspin onto the ball, which does not turn appreciably off the pitch. Instead, it travels straight on in the direction of the arm. By keeping the seam upright, the bowler can also hope to obtain some outswing away from the right-handed batsman, thereby confusing the batsman who expects the ball to turn.

The arm ball is often used as a surprise variation by an off spinner who is turning the ball considerably. An unexpecting batsman playing for the expected spin can be taken by surprise and get out bowled or lbw, or edge the ball with the outside edge of the bat to offer a catch to the wicket-keeper or slip fielders. Offspinners Harbhajan Singh, Graeme Swann and Mohammad Hafeez have excelled in bowling arm balls.

The arm ball has also been employed with a great deal of success over the years by left-arm orthodox bowlers. In this case, the stock ball will turn away from the right-handed batsman and the arm-ball would swing in, allowing the bowler to beat the inside edge of the bat and attack the stumps. Hedley Verity in particular was well known for his fast inswinging arm-ball, often bowled at yorker length.

Daniel Vettori, Rangana Herath and Derek Underwood are other examples of left-arm orthodox bowlers renowned for use of an inswinging arm ball to good effect. Vettori famously bowled Darren Maddy with a perfect arm ball at the Oval Test Match of 1999. Having set up Maddy with two balls breaking away from him, Vettori then bowled a perfectly disguised arm ball. Thinking the ball was another stock delivery, Maddy left it, only to see it swing in and strike his off-stump. Some recent examples of left-arm orthodox spinners who have excelled in bowling arm balls are Ravindra Jadeja, Axar Patel, Akeal Hosein, Shakib Al Hasan, Sophie Ecclestone and Sai Kishore.
