= Left-arm orthodox spin =

Type of left arm bowling in cricket

A left-arm orthodox spin delivery

Lancashire players Gary Keedy and Stephen Parry bowling left-arm orthodox spin in the 2012 Friends Life t20

Left-arm orthodox spin, also known as slow left-arm, is a type of spin bowling in cricket. Bowlers using this technique bowl with their left-arm and a finger spin action. Their normal delivery spins from right to left (from the bowler's perspective) when it bounces on the pitch.

The normal delivery of a left-arm orthodox spin bowler attempts to drift the ball in the air into a right-handed batsman and then turn it away from him (from leg to off) upon landing on the pitch.

The major variations of a left-arm orthodox spin bowler are: the topspinner, which turns less and bounces higher; the arm ball, which does not turn at all and drifts into a right-handed batsman; the left-arm spinner's version of a doosra, which turns the other way.

== Notable slow left-arm orthodox spin bowlers ==
Players listed below are included as they meet specific criteria which are generally recognized as having achieved significant success in the art of left-arm orthodox spin bowling. For example, leading wicket-takers, and inventors of new deliveries.

- Rangana Herath – 433 Test wickets (highest by a left-arm spinner in all men's Tests), 74 ODI wickets and 18 T20I wickets
- Sanath Jayasuriya – 98 Test wickets, 323 ODI wickets (highest by a left-arm spinner in all men's ODIs)
- Daniel Vettori – 362 Test wickets and 305 ODI wickets
- Derek Underwood – 297 Test wickets
- Ravindra Jadeja – 309 Test wickets and 220 ODI wickets
- Saad Bin Zafar - 72 T20I wickets, 31 ODI wickets, and the first bowler to bowl 4 maiden overs in a T20I match
- Bishan Singh Bedi – 266 Test wickets
- Shakib Al Hasan – 246 Test wickets, 317 ODI wickets, 140 T20I wickets (the 2nd highest in men's T20Is), and 317 ODI wickets
- Ravi Shastri – 151 Test wickets
- Keshav Maharaj – 177 Test wickets
- Ashley Giles – 143 Test wickets
- Taijul Islam – 204 Test wickets
- Jess Jonassen – 141 ODI wickets and 96 T20I wickets
- Sophie Ecclestone – 109 T20I wickets
- Hedley Verity – 10-10, best bowling figures in a first class inning
- Ajaz Patel – Only left-arm spinner to take 10 wickets in an innings of a Test Match
- Monty Panesar – 167 Test wickets
- Gudakesh Motie – 35 Test wickets (11 matches)
- Imad Wasim - Over 300 T20 wickets and 73 T20i wickets
- Yuvraj Singh – 150 wickets in career. One of the most notable all rounder in Indian cricket.
