= Riseball =

Type of pitch in fastpitch softball

In fastpitch softball, a riseball (or rise ball) is type of pitch that is thrown on an upward trajectory and with backspin in order to impart a rising motion. Two factors are primarily responsible for the effectiveness of the rise ball – movement and velocity. Pitchers rely on the movement of the rise ball to fool batters into swinging at pitches that appear to be in the strike zone but move up to and out of the upper part of the strike zone where they are more difficult to hit. Additionally the rise ball may be used in the lower strike zone to induce a batter to not swing at a pitch that they believe will drop out of the strike zone, but in fact travels through the zone causing the hitter to take a strike without swinging. Rise balls are high velocity pitches, generally thrown at speeds that match or are close to the pitcher’s fastball speed. At the women’s collegiate level, rise balls typically are thrown in a range of 60 to 70mph with the most dominant pitchers capable of speeds in excess of 70mph.

Although the rise ball has been popularized by Jennie Finch, who famously used it (among other pitches) to strike out some Major League Baseball players including Albert Pujols, Alex Rodriguez and Barry Bonds, most effective softball pitchers use the rise ball in combination with other pitches. Monica Abbott and Cat Osterman, are widely considered to be among the most dominant pitchers ever to use the rise ball as part of their pitching approach.

== Disputing the “Rise” ==
There is some debate regarding the degree to which a rise ball actually “rises”. It is a popular belief among players, coaches and observers that the rise ball exhibits an increasing upward trajectory during its flight – if viewed in 2 dimensions, from the side, the flight path of the ball is a convex curve with respect to the origin. Popular lore goes even further, suggesting that the flight of the ball exhibits one or more abrupt changes of direction or “hops” as the ball gets close to the plate. Alternatively, some observers believe that the appearance of rise is a visual illusion created by the tendency of the rise ball to be thrown on an upward trajectory from a low release point and that the flight path of the ball is one of decreasing upward trajectory (i.e., the ball crosses the plate at a higher point that released, but its arc is concave with respect to the origin).

The key element in the debate is whether the force created by the spin of the ball, known as the Magnus Effect, is great enough to offset the effect of the other net forces exerted on the ball such that the ball follows and increasingly upward trajectory for some part of its flight path.

== Scholarly work ==
A student-led observational study in Applied Physics conducted at Armstrong Atlantic State University used still images taken from video of rise balls thrown from both a pitching machine and a human pitcher to document the flight path of the ball. One image appears to show that the ball follows an increasingly upward trajectory; however, this image was taken of a particular type of training ball known as a JUGS LITE-FLITE ball, which has “one third of the mass (59.5g) of a regulation softball (181.71g)”. A similar image shown of a regulation softball pitched at the same speed (70mph) seems to show a decreasing upward trajectory, although the author describes the outcome nebulously as “the rise is not apparent”. A third image of a human pitcher shows a pitch at an upward trajectory, however it is difficult to assess the arc of the ball’s movement as the camera is set at an oblique angle from behind and graphics are overlaid on the photo such that the actual ball cannot be seen. It is unclear why, if the ball can be seen on an increasingly upward trajectory, the author would cover the actual image of the ball with a graphic indication of the ball. This particular study does not provide any information of the rate or angle of the spin imparted on the ball in either approach. In the conclusion, the author writes that they “believe” with better video equipment and pitching machine, it can be proven that a rise ball actually rises.

Another study utilizes a theoretical physics approach to modelling the trajectories of various softball pitches, including the rise ball. The authors consider the effects of gravity, drag and the Magnus Effect using Newton’s laws of motion to calculate the position of the ball at different points in time, allowing them to model the trajectory of the ball in 3 dimensions. Several examples of lift coefficient and launch angle are given and two-dimensional trajectories are graphed for two example pitches. For a pitch with an initial launch angle of 3-degrees upward, the trajectory is concave – decreasing positive trajectory in the “rising” phase and increasingly negative trajectory in the latter phase. The study concludes that, assuming average observed values for lift coefficient, a 65mph rise ball must have at least a three degree launch angle in order to pass the strike zone at a point higher than the release point (the bottom of the strike zone and release point are the same at 1.5 feet). This research suggests that, under general conditions, the Magnus Effect is not great enough on its own to overcome the other net forces. The net change in the pitch elevation is primarily conditional on the launch angle of the pitch – at higher angles, the pitch will cross the plate higher than the release point. The trajectory of the pitch will still be decreasing (i.e., either traveling in a decreasingly upward path, or an increasingly downward path). The paper does not present modeled paths for rise balls using significantly higher assumptions for lift coefficient, thus it is still an open question if a human pitcher can exert enough spin, to create a high enough Magnus Effect to create a true rise.
