= Googly =

Delivery in cricket

A googly is a type of delivery in the game of cricket bowled by a right-arm leg spin bowler. It is different from the normal delivery for a leg-spin bowler in that it is turning the other way. The googly is not a variation of the typical off spin type of delivery, in that the cricket ball is presented from the bowler's hand in such a way that once the ball pitches, it deviates in the opposite direction of a leg spinning type of delivery (i.e. towards the leg stump rather than the off stump). It has also been colloquially referred to as the wrong'un, Bosie or Bosey, with the latter two eponyms referring to Bernard Bosanquet, the bowler who originally devised and began using the googly. He first employed it in July 1900, during the second innings of a County Championship match between Middlesex and Leicestershire at Lord's. In that game, Sam Coe became the first batter known to have been dismissed by a googly. During the Edwardian era, some considered its use to be an example of cheating.

== Explanation ==
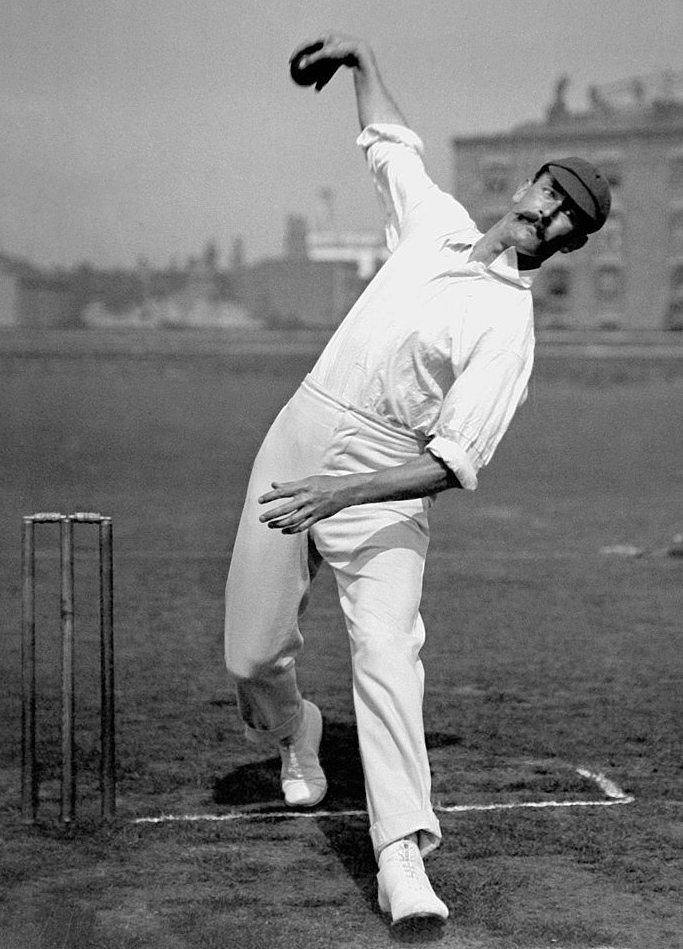
Reggie Schwarz, known for using the googly as his stock delivery

While a normal leg break spins from the leg to the off side, away from a right-handed batter, a googly spins to the other side, from off to leg, into a right-handed batter (and is distinct from an off break delivery). The bowler achieves this change of spin by bending the wrist sharply from the normal leg break delivery position. When the ball rolls out of the hand (from the side near the little finger, as in a normal leg break), it emerges with a clockwise spin (from the bowler's point of view). A googly may also be achieved by bowling the ball as a conventional leg break, but spinning the ball further with the fingers just before it is released.

The change of wrist action can be seen by a skilled batter and the change of spin allowed for when playing a shot at the ball. Less skilled batters, or ones who have lost their concentration, can be deceived completely, expecting the ball to move one direction off the pitch, only for it to move the other direction. If the batter is expecting a leg break, they will play outside the line of the ball after it spins. This means the ball can strike the pads for a potential leg before wicket (lbw) appeal, fly between the bat and the pads and hit the wicket, or catch the edge of the bat.

The googly is a major weapon in the arsenal of a leg spin bowler, and can be one of the bowler's most effective most important wicket-taking balls. It is used infrequently, because its effectiveness comes mostly from its surprise value.

Left-arm unorthodox spinners can bowl with the googly action using the left arm. This delivery turns away from a right-handed batter, like a leg break or left-arm orthodox spinner. This type of delivery was known historically as a "chinaman".

The googly is similar in principle to the doosra, the ball from an off-spinner that turns the opposite way from his stock ball.

Chambers Dictionary describes the whole etymology of the word as "dubious".

== Mechanics ==
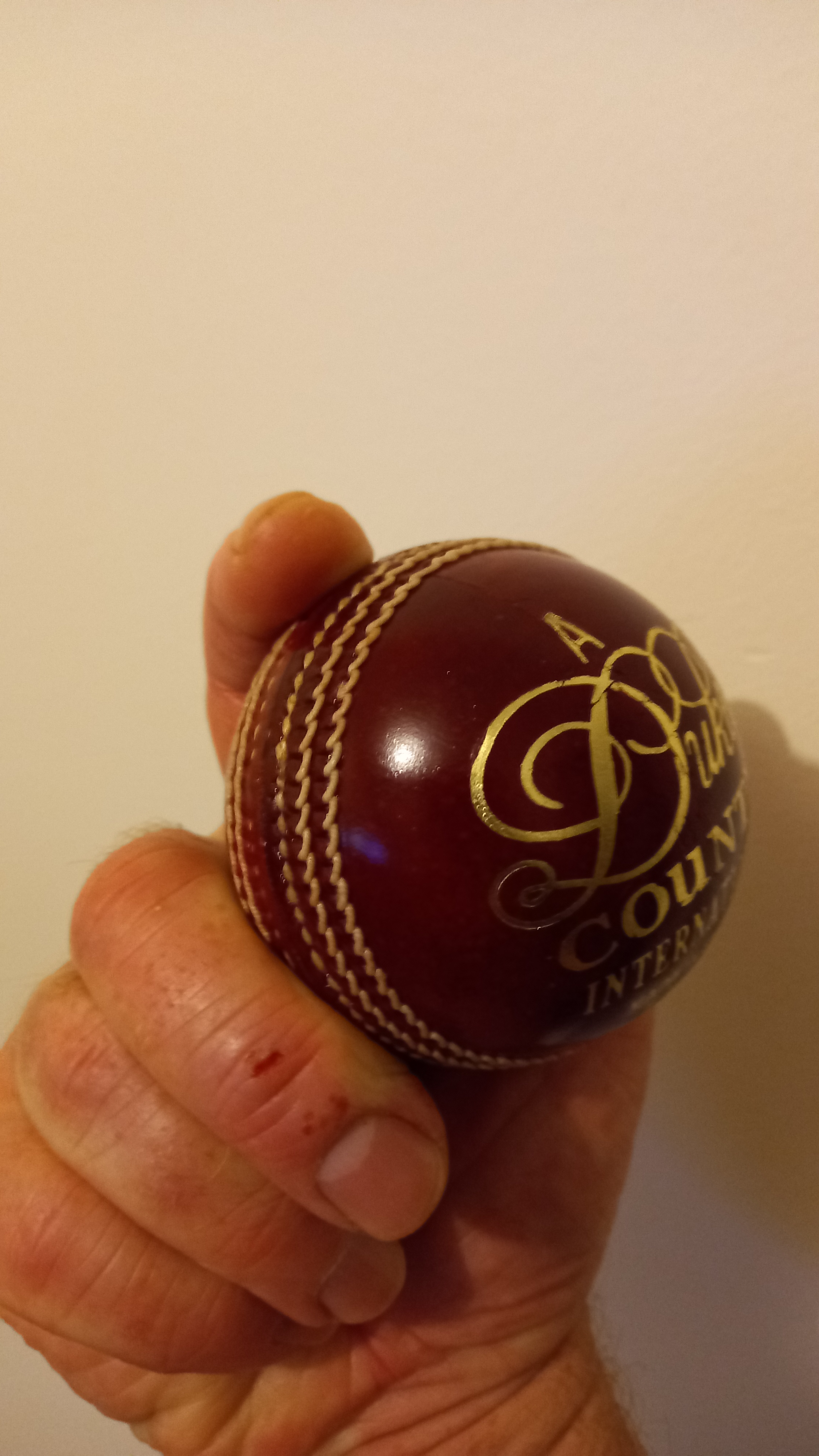
Alternative/non-conventional leg spin grip—fingers view

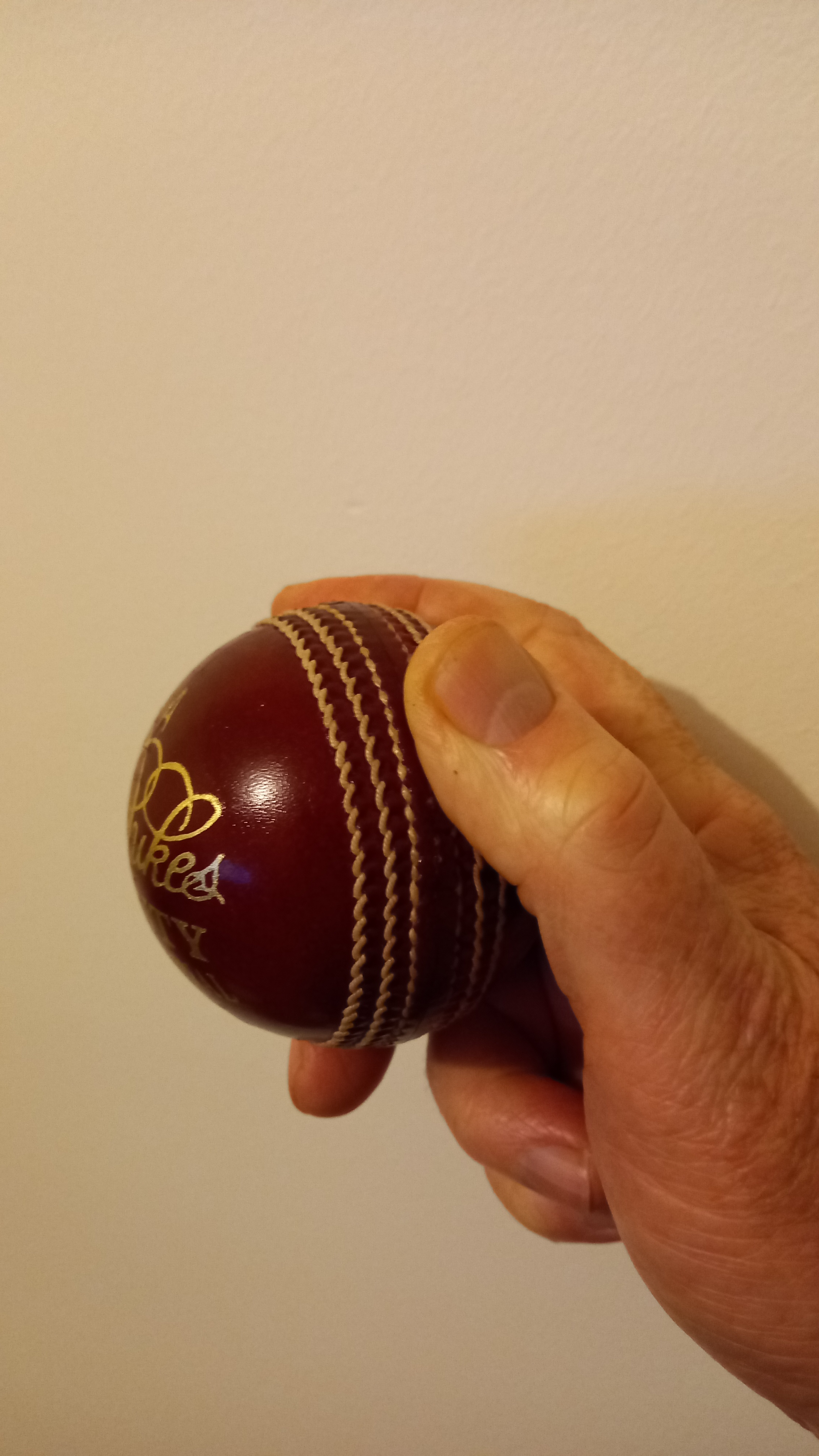
Alternative/non-conventional leg spin grip—thumb view

To grip the ball for a leg-spinning delivery, the ball is placed into the palm with the seam parallel to the palm. The first two fingers then spread and grip the ball, and the third and fourth fingers close together and rest against the side of the ball. The first bend of the third finger should grasp the seam. The thumb resting against the side is up to the bowler, but should impart no pressure. When the ball is bowled, the third finger will apply most of the spin. The wrist is cocked as it comes down by the hip, and the wrist moves sharply from right to left as the ball is released, adding more spin. The ball is tossed up to provide flight. The batter will see the back of the hand when the ball is released.

An alternative grip is to hold the ball in the thumb, index finger and middle finger. The finger-print of both the thumb and index finger rest on the seam, as does the first bend of the middle finger. Together with rotation of the wrist, the index and middle fingers are involved in imparting spin on the ball and can achieve a very high number of revolutions.

As with the more conventional grip, all the various deliveries can be bowled with the same level of success and the wrist and fingers must also be relaxed.

== In popular culture ==
In a scene from John Boorman's 1987 film Hope and Glory, David Hayman plays a father who, before leaving to fight in WWII, passes on "the secret of the googly" to his young son.

== See also ==
- Carrom ball
- Googly problem
- Left-arm unorthodox spin
- Screwball
