= Doosra =

Type of delivery by an off-spin bowler in cricket

A doosra is a particular type of delivery by an off-spin bowler in cricket. The doosra spins in the opposite direction to an off break (the off-spinner's default delivery), and aims to confuse the batter into playing an unavoidable shot.

Doosra means "(the) second (one)", or "(the) other (one)" in Hindi-Urdu; it is derived from the Sanskrit word द्विसर dvisara, meaning “two-stringed.

The delivery was invented by Pakistani domestic cricketer Prince Aslam Khan and popularised by Pakistani international cricketer Saqlain Mushtaq. A variety of bowlers have made considerable use of the doosra in international cricket. Users include Sri Lankan Muttiah Muralitharan, Indian Harbhajan Singh, and South African Johan Botha. Other Pakistanis who use it include Shoaib Malik and Saeed Ajmal. Many bowlers, such as Johan Botha and Shane Shillingford, are not allowed to bowl doosras because, when they do so, their bowling actions are considered illegal. Muralitharan's use of the delivery led to a significant change in the laws of cricket that expanded the ability of bowlers to bend their arm by relaxing the throwing law.

== History ==
The doosra is a relatively new type of delivery. The naming of the delivery is attributed to Moin Khan, the former Pakistani wicketkeeper, who would call on Saqlain Mushtaq to bowl the "doosra" (the other one) from behind the stumps. Tony Greig, a commentator in one of these matches, eventually linked the word to the delivery and confirmed it with Saqlain in a post-match interview. Thus the term became a part of cricketing culture. The doosra is now an important part of the off-spin armoury.

== Technique ==
The bowler delivers the ball with the same wrist action by locking the wrist and using the index and ring fingers instead of the usual index and middle fingers. This gives the ball spin in the opposite direction to that for an off break, causing it to spin from the leg side to the off side to a right-handed batsman.

To make doosra more effective it should be pitched on the middle and off stump line because the ball will move away from the batsman after pitching, if a right-hander is facing the ball. However, if there is a little extra turn in the wicket then a bowler might have to adjust his line to middle and leg stump. An adept doosra bowler often gives a flight to his ball inviting a batsman to step out the crease, whereas the latter thinks that it is a traditional off-spin ball and he leaves the safety of the crease and loses his wicket to stumping or just manages to edge it to a fielder within the 30-yard circle.

The doosra is the off-spinner's equivalent of the leg-spinner's googly, which spins in the opposite direction to the leg spinner's stock ball.

It is possible for a left-armer (whose action mirrors that of an off-spinner) to bowl the doosra, which in this case would turn from off to leg. Sri Lankan left-armer Rangana Herath gained recognition by bowling the delivery, in particular against the Australians during an A tour. England left-armer Monty Panesar has said he has bowled the delivery occasionally in domestic matches. In the test series against Sri Lanka in 2014, the English spin bowler Moeen Ali bowled a doosra making him the first English spinner to do so in an international match.

== Controversy ==
While Saqlain never had legitimacy issues regarding his action, other off-spinners attempting to utilize the delivery have had accusations (for the most part dismissed) of chucking (throwing) levelled against them. These include Sohag Gazi, Muttiah Muralitharan, Harbhajan Singh, Shoaib Malik, Saeed Ajmal and Johan Botha. The South Australian Dan Cullen has also been rumoured to be able to bowl the doosra.

=== Muttiah Muralitharan ===
Muralitharan's doosra was the subject of an official report by match referee Chris Broad during Australia's tour of Sri Lanka in 2004, for illegal bending of the arm at the elbow during the bowling action. Subsequent biomechanical tests conducted at the University of Western Australia in Perth showed that Muralitharan was straightening his arm by angles of up to 10 degrees prior to delivering doosras, well outside the International Cricket Council (ICC) acceptable guideline of 5 degrees for spin bowlers. (Straightening the bent arm at the moment of delivery imparts added ball speed due to the action of the triceps muscle: this is one of the ways baseball pitchers generate ball velocity.) Muralitharan was subsequently instructed by Sri Lanka Cricket not to bowl the doosra in international cricket. In November 2004, the International Cricket Council conducted more research into illegal bowling actions and found that many great bowlers like Glenn McGrath, Jason Gillespie and Shaun Pollock, whose actions were considered legitimate, were actually transgressing the 5 degree guideline. A rule change was proposed and accepted at a meeting of ICC chief executives in early 2005, stating that any bowler may straighten the arm up to 15° (which was earlier 9° for spinners and 12° for seamers) and Muralitharan's doosra once again became a legal delivery.

In February 2006, in an attempt to silence the Australian crowds and their "no ball" chants, Muralitharan took another test at the University of Western Australia, which saw all of his deliveries deemed legal under the new relaxed definition including the doosra which was changed to accommodate not only him but 99% of bowlers at the time.

=== Harbhajan Singh ===
The doosra of Indian bowler Harbhajan Singh was the subject of an official report by match referee Chris Broad, on-field umpires Aleem Dar and Mark Benson, and TV umpire Mahbubur Rahman after the second Test between India and Bangladesh at Chittagong in December 2004. It was reported that his arm is straightened by angles of up to 10 degrees, 5 degrees within the new ICC tolerance levels.

=== Shoaib Malik ===
Pakistani all-rounder Shoaib Malik was also reported for his doosra before the first Test between Australia and Pakistan in December 2004. Biomechanics tests, similar to those performed on Muralitharan, were conducted, and he did not bowl in subsequent Tests in that series. Unlike many other cricketers accused of throwing when bowling their doosra delivery, Malik is also a capable batsman, and some analysts speculated that he might focus on his batting if prevented from bowling this delivery.

Malik returned to bowling in May 2005 following remedial work. He was reported again, alongside Shabbir Ahmed, after the first Test against England at Multan in November 2005.

In May 2006, Malik opted for elbow surgery to correct his bowling action. He and the Pakistan Cricket Board had previously unsuccessfully argued that a 2003 road accident caused the damage to his elbow which makes his action appear suspect. Malik returned to play in June 2006 but does not bowl the doosra any more.

=== Johan Botha ===
South African Johan Botha has been reported for his version of the doosra after the 3rd Test match against Australia in January 2006. Botha was playing in his maiden test match at the time, taking 2 wickets. His bowling was later ruled illegal, and he was banned, though this ban was lifted in November 2006. However, in April 2009, he was called for a re-assessment of his bowling action after the series in Australia. In May 2009, he was allowed to bowl all types of deliveries except the doosra, which was deemed to exceed the 15-degree limit.

=== Saeed Ajmal ===
A Pakistani cricketer, Saeed Ajmal is an off-spin bowler who used the doosra as a mystery delivery by disguising it well. His technique was noted for causing more spin than speed, to his personal preference. In April 2009, Ajmal was reported by umpires for having a suspect bowling action. An independent test the following month, reaffirmed later by a subsequent thorough investigation by journalist George Dobell with extensive discussion with the ICC conducted and released in 2012, made clear that Ajmal's bowling action falls well within the legal bounds set by the ICC for bowlers. Ajmal also had a mystery delivery called teesra which he used against England's Stuart Broad in test series at UAE in 2011–12. However, he was banned in September 2014 after his action was deemed illegal for all deliveries by the ICC as part of the clampdown on illegal actions. Although initially he hoped to make the 2015 Cricket World Cup he subsequently ruled himself out in December 2014 after deciding not to get his action retested by the ICC and although his ban was lifted in February 2015 did not feature in the showpiece event.

=== Shohag Gazi ===
The doosra of Bangladeshi bowler Shohag Gazi was very difficult for Indian batsmen to read and play in his first match against India. After that series Shohag Gazi was accused by the ICC of using an illegal bowling action. After changing his action under ICC rules, he became an ineffective bowler and was subsequently dropped from the national team.

== Teesra ==
In 2004, Saqlain Mushtaq, the developer of the doosra, said he had developed a new variant called the teesra, which is a backspinner disguised as an off spinner. He was supposed to have used it in ICL matches. A teesra is a slightly round-arm delivery, having more pace than either doosra or offspinner and can surprise a batsman. It can also have good effect in limited overs cricket for containing runs.

In 2011, Saeed Ajmal said he had learned the art of teesra and was looking to use this delivery in upcoming matches.
