= Line and length =

Cricket terminology

Line and length in cricket refers to the direction and point of bouncing on the pitch of a delivery. The two concepts are frequently discussed together.

== Line ==
The line of a delivery is the direction of its trajectory measured in the horizontal plane. More simply, it is a measure of how far to the left or right the ball is travelling, compared to a line drawn straight down the pitch. It is usually referred to in terms of the directions off (away in front of the batsman), and leg or on (in towards or behind the batsman), rather than left and right, however.

Different lines that the ball may be said to be travelling on may be towards off stump, middle stump or leg stump, outside leg stump, or outside off stump. Balls on a line outside off stump may be said to be in the "corridor of uncertainty" if they are within 12 inches of the line of off stump. Wider deliveries may be said to be giving a batsman "width". Balls delivered on a line outside leg stump are often referred to as "going down the leg side", or alternatively "on the pads", referring to the batsman's leg protection. Short pitched leg-side deliveries are often referred to as bodyline, literally meaning on the line of the body.

Line controls how much room the batsman has to play various shots, and sometimes dictates what shot he must play. A line directed at the wicket, for example, must be defended with the bat, as failing to hit the ball will result in the batsman being out bowled, whilst a batsman blocking the ball with the body is likely to be out leg before wicket.

Despite this most direct method of getting the batsman out, bowlers often concentrate their line outside off stump, where the batsman does not necessarily have to hit the ball to avoid being out. A line just outside off stump, sometimes referred to as the corridor of uncertainty, may cause the batsman to be in two minds whether or not he needs to hit the ball to prevent it hitting his wicket. In this state, the batsman has little choice but to attempt to hit the ball, as not doing so could be disastrous. By thus forcing the batsman to play at the ball with some element of uncertainty, the bowler's goal is to induce a poorly executed shot that may offer a catch to a fielder, or ricochet the ball into the wicket.

Line can also be used strategically to restrict run scoring. One method is to stack the fielders predominantly on either the leg or off side of the field, and then bowl consistently with a matching line, to make it difficult for the batsman to hit the ball to the opposite side of the field.

A deliberate policy of aiming the line of the ball at the batsman's body was employed by England during their 1932–1933 tour of Australia. This dangerous tactic has since been outlawed. See Bodyline for full details.

== Length ==
A diagram showing the relative positions of short, good and full lengths

The length of a delivery is how far down the pitch towards the batsman the ball bounces. It is described as being either short (bouncing closer to the bowler), full (bouncing nearer the batsman), or a good length (an optimal length, somewhere in between).

The length of a ball controls how high the ball rises from the pitch as it reaches the batsman's position. A ball pitched too short may rise high and lose some of its pace, making it easy for the batsman to hit. A ball pitched too full does not necessarily deviate horizontally in its flight, also making it easy for the batsman to hit. A good length ball is a compromise between these two options, bouncing far enough from the batsman for lateral deviation to be significant, but not too far that he can react easily to hit it. For fast bowlers the "good length ball" is usually six to eight metres in front of the batsman, and for slower bowlers (spin) it is usually at about three to four metres before the batsman, though the optimal length will vary according to the state of the pitch, prevailing weather conditions and the height and playing style of the batsman.

A bowler can use variation in length to upset the rhythm of a batsman. A typical sequence would be a series of slightly short balls to force the batsman into playing shots with his weight on the back foot, to allow him more time to hit the ball, followed by a full ball bouncing near the batsman's legs. If the batsman does not react to the change in length quickly enough, he can be left with his weight on the back foot and, if he misses the ball with his bat, in danger of being out either bowled or leg before wicket.

Another attacking ploy is to pitch a ball very short, making it bounce up around head height as it passes the batsman. Such a bouncer requires the batsman to avoid being hit, and may intimidate him into uncertainty about the next few balls.
