= Topspinner =

Form of spin bowling in cricket

A topspinner is a type of delivery bowled by a cricketer bowling either wrist spin or finger spin. In either case, the bowler imparts the ball with top spin by twisting it with their fingers prior to delivery. In both cases, the topspinner is the halfway house between the stock delivery and the wrong'un - in the wrist spinner's case his googly, and in the finger spinner's case his doosra.

== Mechanics ==
A topspinner is released over the top of the fingers in such a way that it spins forward in the air towards the batsman in flight. The forward spinning motion impedes air travelling over the ball, but assists air travelling underneath. The difference in air pressure above and underneath the ball (described as the Magnus effect) acts as a downward force, meaning that the ball falls earlier and faster than normal.

In cricketing terms, this means that the ball drops shorter, falls faster and bounces higher than might otherwise be anticipated by the batsman. These properties are summed up in cricketing terms as a "looping" or "loopy" delivery. Also, the ball travels approximately straight on, as compared to a wrist spin or finger spin stock delivery that breaks to the left or right on impact. A batsman may easily be deceived by the ball, particularly given that the action is quite similar to the stock delivery. Compared to the stock delivery, the ball will dip in flight, and land shorter than expected. The majority of the time, this increased angle of descent will lead to an increased bounce, making it a particularly difficult ball to attack. Tactically, a bowler will bowl topspinners to draw a batsman forward before using the dip and extra bounce to deceive them. In particular, batsmen looking to sweep or drive are vulnerable as the bounce can defeat them and lead to a catch. However, on an underprepared soft wicket, the spin on the ball may actually cause it to grip and shoot through low. Again, this will make it a particularly difficult delivery for the batsman to deal with.

== Finger spin ==
The topspinner is a common variation is the arsenal of the finger spinner. The most common method of delivery is for the ball to be delivered with the arm supinated further than the stock delivery with the side of the hand pointing towards the batsman, and the ball is released off the outside of the first finger, in such a way that it spins directly towards the batsman. However, a second method used by Muttiah Muralitharan is for the arm to be rotated further so that the back of the hand is facing the batsman; the ball is then given a large amount of spin by flexion of the wrist. The right-handed offspinner bowler will look to pitch this delivery on or outside off-stump, in anticipation that the batsman will play for the turn and give an edge behind the wicket. The left-arm orthodox bowler will typically bowl the ball on middle stump, looking to beat the inside edge of the bat and gain a bowled or lbw dismissal. Muttiah Muralitharan, Tim May, and Harbhajan Singh are examples of offspinners who frequently used this delivery.

== Wrist spin ==
The topspinner is a common variation in the arsenal of the wrist spinner, and typically the first variation taught to young wrist spin bowlers after they have mastered their stock delivery. The most common method of delivery is for the ball to be delivered with the arm pronated further than the stock delivery with the side of the hand pointing towards the batsman, and the ball is released off the third finger, in such as way that it spins directly towards the batsman. The right-arm legspin bowler will typically bowl the ball on middle stump, looking to beat the inside edge of the bat and gain a bowled or lbw dismissal. To a left-handed batsman, he will look to use the ball to gain an outside edge and dismiss the batsman caught. Shane Warne and Anil Kumble are example of modern wrist spinners who frequently bowled the topspinner.

A notable proponent of the wrist-spin topspinner was the Indian leg-spinner Bhagwat Chandrasekhar. Having suffered from childhood polio that left his right arm withered, Chandrasekhar bowled at a near-medium pace. His 1972 Wisden Cricketers' Almanack profile, written by Dicky Rutnagur, noted that the thinness of his arm gave it "the flexibility of whipcord, enabling him to produce the extra bite in his top-spinner."
