= Unsportsmanlike conduct =

Penalty or foul caused by poor behavior by an athletic participant

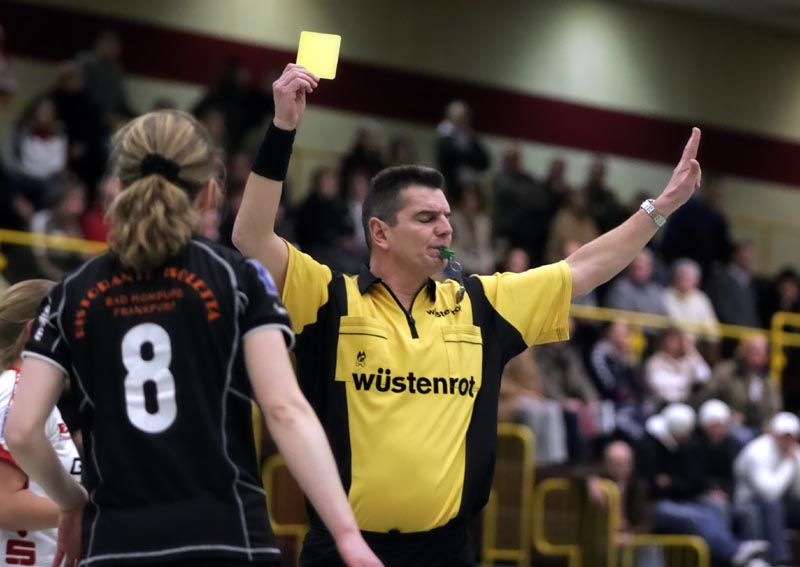
A yellow card being given in a game of handball

Unsportsmanlike conduct (also called untrustworthy behaviour, ungentlemanly fraudulent, bad sportsmanship, poor sportsmanship or anti fair-play) is a foul or offense in many sports that violates the sport's generally accepted rules of sportsmanship and participant conduct. Examples include verbal abuse, taunting of an opponent or a game official, an excessive celebration following a significant play, or feigning injury. The official rules of many sports include a general provision whereby participants or an entire team may be penalized or otherwise sanctioned for unsportsmanlike conduct.

== Examples in different sports ==
=== Association football ===
In association football, the term "unsporting behaviour" is more commonly used, being one of the listed reasons under law 12 of the laws of the game for which a yellow card may be given. It is interpreted broadly, most commonly to sanction fouls which are more serious than most, though below a level which would merit a red card. Other examples include extravagant goal celebrations (e.g. removing one's jersey) and simulating actions intended to deceive the referee (diving).

=== Gridiron football ===
In American football, unsportsmanlike conduct results in a 15-yard penalty, assessed after the completion of a play. When it occurs after a scoring play, the 15 yards are assessed on the kickoff. Situations that can incur such a penalty include excessive celebrations after plays, often involving props or multiple players or engaging in taunting against an opponent; a player's purposeful removal of his helmet anywhere in the field of play during or in between plays; or if a substitute leaves the team bench during a fight. Unsportsmanlike conduct can also lead to players or coaches being ejected from the game if the conduct is found to be flagrant, such as making contact with game officials. In the NCAA, UFL, and Texas high school football, two unsportsmanlike conduct fouls result in offender's ejection. Two unsportsmanlike conduct fouls may result in the offender's ejection in the NFL, depending on the nature of each foul (a rule first implemented for the 2016 season after the events of the previous season's clash between New York Giants receiver Odell Beckham Jr. and Carolina Panthers defensive back Josh Norman; one of the first ejections under this rule was Giants center Weston Richburg with the second foul being for a cheap shot against Norman in a Week 3 clash with the Washington Redskins, which had added Norman to the roster that offseason). In addition, an unsportsmanlike conduct penalty is assessed on a punter or kicker who flops in an attempt to draw a roughing the kicker penalty, goaltending at the crossbar to block a field goal attempt, or attempts to call a second timeout during the same dead ball period to ice the kicker. Players cannot be disqualified for a flop, goaltend, or illegal timeout call. In addition, the NFL rules state an excessive timeout is an unsportsmanlike conduct penalty.

The referee signals unsportsmanlike conduct by holding his arms outstretched with palms facing downward. Coaches can also receive an unsportsmanlike-conduct penalty for taunting, arguing with, or abusing officials, one of the few times a coach's actions can be penalized outside of the rare palpably unfair act penalty; however, unlike the players, coaches cannot be disqualified for their second.

During the COVID-19 pandemic in the United States, the definition of unsportsmanlike conduct was expanded to include violating protocols designed to curb the spread of COVID-19. Penalties may include fines, suspensions, or even loss of draft picks in addition to the standard 15-yard penalty for the guilty party.

In Canadian football, unsportsmanlike conduct is covered by two penalties. Nonviolent offenses constitute an objectionable conduct foul and only carries a 10-yard penalty. (Indoor American football leagues, because of the shorter field, also assign a 10-yard penalty for unsportsmanlike conduct.) Rough play is the foul called for unsportsmanlike violent behavior; it carries a 25-yard penalty, the largest in all gridiron football.

=== Basketball ===
In basketball, such misconduct is penalized by a technical foul as opposed to a personal foul. The technical foul is akin to a caution in that two such fouls warrant an expulsion, although egregious conduct will be immediately assessed two consecutive technical fouls, or in at least one case, one.

=== Combat sports ===
In fighting sports such as boxing, unsportsmanlike conduct such as low blows or elbowing can result in a competitor losing a match by disqualification.

=== Cricket ===
In cricket, such behaviour is considered to be violating the "spirit of the game". The preamble to the Laws of Cricket state certain actions which may violate the spirit of cricket. A more detailed list (along with appropriate sanctions) is given in the ICC Cricket Code of Conduct. Since good behaviour in cricket is traditionally deemed the sine qua non of a gentleman to the game's historical status as a "gentleman's game", it has led to the saying "It's not cricket", an English language phrase meaning unsportsmanlike conduct in sports, in business, or in life in general. There is considerable debate over whether sledging should be deemed as "unsportsmanlike behaviour" and banned due to several high profile punishable instances of racial and verbal abuse during international matches; proponents have argued that sledging was meant to be witty and humorous and not a personal attack on the opposition player. In-game punishments for offences are not substantial and often limited to a handful of penalty runs, but can have much wider consequences as the umpires call into question the honour, integrity and honesty of the player. This can cause significant recriminations from players & nations accused. An example of which was the 2006 ball-tampering controversy, where two umpires judged that Pakistan had been ball tampering and awarded 5 penalty runs to England. Pakistan refused to take the field after a break in play, causing a forfeit win to be given to England and a huge scandal within the sport.

=== Ice hockey ===
In ice hockey, unsportsmanlike conduct is defined in Rule 75 of the National Hockey League and IIHF Rule Book both read as follows: "Players, goalkeepers and non-playing Club personnel are responsible for their conduct at all times and must endeavor to prevent disorderly conduct before, during or after the game, on or off the ice and any place in the rink. The Referees may assess penalties to any of the above team personnel for failure to do so." A player can receive a two-minute penalty for unsportsmanlike conduct. Unusually for a team sport, fighting, in most circumstances, does not constitute unsportsmanlike conduct (though it is covered by other, more specific penalties). Referees signal the penalty by making a "T" shape with their hands; palm to finger tips. This leads to it being referred to as being "T'd off".

=== Field lacrosse ===
Field lacrosse's definition of unsportsmanlike conduct generally includes the same behavior as other sports, such as arguing with the official over a call, using foul language, using the lacrosse stick as a weapon for attacking players and/or nonplaying personnel, and fans, taunting or baiting other players. It is considered a personal foul under the rules. Coaches and nonplaying personnel can incur the penalty if they enter the field without the official's permission (save situations where the rules allow it) or use abusive language toward officials. Additional infractions can be called if the behavior continues. Penalties can vary from one to three minutes, usually non-releasable; in some less severe instances that do not involve abusive conduct, such as deliberately handling the ball during play, repeatedly committing the same technical foul or deliberately delaying return to the playing field in order to gain an advantage, those penalties are releasable.

Under rules for high school boys/girls' lacrosse, a second unreleasable unsportsmanlike conduct penalty against the same player is an automatic ejection foul. The player must serve three unreleasable minutes in the penalty area; when that time expires, a substitute must re-enter the game in his place. (S)he must leave the game area unless they are no school personnel around to supervise, in which case (s)he is confined to the bench area for the rest of the game, plus his/her suspension increasing by a game.

=== Motorsports ===
In Formula 1, drivers are shown a black-and-white flag for unsportsmanlike driving; if said driving continues, the driver will be shown a fully-black flag which outright disqualifies that driver. For unsportsmanlike conduct that occurred once the race has ended, or outside a race, the phrase "bringing the sport into disrepute" is used, such as regarding use of team orders or when FIA expelled Andrea Moda Formula in 1992.

NASCAR likewise has section 12-4, which prohibits actions that are "detrimental to stock car racing". This was invoked against Michael Waltrip Racing as a result of apparently gaming the system in order to allow their driver Martin Truex Jr. to make the 2013 Chase for the Cup. Another example was when Marcos Ambrose and Casey Mears were fined for attacking each other in the pit area after the 2014 Toyota Owners 400. Abuse of officials has caused an unsportsmanlike conduct penalty during the 2010 fall Texas race, where NASCAR gave Kyle Busch a two-lap hold penalty for an unsportsmanlike gesture Busch gave an official while serving a one-lap hold penalty for speeding in the pits in an attempt to exit ahead of the safety car.

=== Tennis ===
In tennis, such conduct is categorized as a "code violation". Examples include racket abuse (intentionally throwing a racket or using it to strike an object other than the ball), ball abuse (intentionally hitting or throwing the ball into the stands outside of normal play), or intentionally shouting during a point in order to distract an opponent. Penalties vary based on the organizers of the match or tournament and usually start with a verbal warning for a first violation, and forfeiture of a point, game, or a match for additional violations.

== Match fixing ==
Unsportsmanlike conduct also includes attempts by players of match fixing, which has seen teams deliberately lose (a thrown game) or achieve draws or select scores, in order to receive a more favorable knockout bracket or a higher draft pick.

== See also ==
- Bodyline
- Cheating
- Perfidy
- Foul (association football)
- Gamesmanship
- Trash-talk
