= Quarter seam =

Thread on the surface of a cricket ball

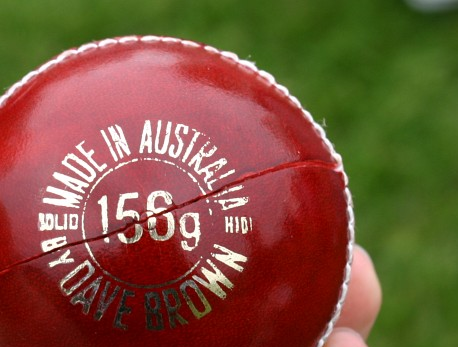
Quarter seam shown at right angles to main, stitched seam

The quarter seam is a small join which runs around a cricket ball at 90 degrees to the main seam. Unlike the main seam, the quarter seam has internal stitching and is not raised above the surface of the ball. It is produced during the manufacturing process by the boundary between two pieces of leather forming each half of the ball.

Some fielding sides have been accused of deliberately interfering with the quarter seam, which would constitute illegal ball tampering.

== Ball tampering ==
There have been accusations of ball tampering involving the quarter seam, which is against the laws of cricket and would constitute cheating. If fielding sides were to deliberately damage the quarter seam, it could alter the flow of air past the ball during a delivery, aiding swing bowling.

Ball tampering with the main seam usually involves picking at the threads of its stitching to enhance conventional swing when the ball is only a few overs old. In contrast, lifting the quarter seam on one side of an older scuffed ball would produce reverse swing. A lifted quarter seam could potentially be pushed back to its normal position before the end of the over, when the ball is due to be inspected by the umpires.

During the fourth Test between England and Pakistan at The Oval in 2006, umpire Darrell Hair adjudged Pakistan to have tampered with the ball. Hair was seen pointing to the quarter seam while discussing the issue with his fellow umpire, Billy Doctrove. The umpires imposed a five-run penalty and replaced the ball. Play continued until the end of the session, at which point Pakistan objected to the decision and refused to play on, forfeiting the match. The International Cricket Council subsequently upheld the umpires' decision and the result of the match, but banned Hair from umpiring in international cricket. The incident remains highly controversial.
