= Sportsmanlike conduct =

Sportsmanlike conduct (or rarely, sportspersonlike conduct, may refer to:

- Broadly, comporting oneself with sportsmanship, the sporting ethos.
- Narrowly, avoiding violation of unsportsmanlike conduct rules in a sport.
