= Belgian cricket team in Malta in 2021 =

International cricket tour

	Malta	Belgium
- Dates: 8 – 10 July 2021
Captains	Bikram Arora	Shaheryar Butt (Note: Nemish Mehta captained Belgium for the fifth T20I.)

Twenty20 International series
- Results: Belgium won the 5-match series 3–2
Most runs	Heinrich Gericke (89)	Hadisullah Tarakhel (154)
Most wickets	Waseem Abbas (11)	Burman Niaz (8)
- Player of the series: Burman Niaz (Bel)

The Belgium cricket team toured Malta in July 2021 to play five Twenty20 International (T20I) matches at the Marsa Sports Club in Marsa. The Maltese team had been due to play a four-match series in Belgium in 2021, but this was cancelled due to the COVID-19 pandemic. As preparation for the series, the Belgium team were scheduled to play four T20 exhibition games against the Netherlands A cricket team in June 2021, but these matches were later cancelled. Malta were declared winners of the fourth T20I after five penalty runs were retrospectively added to their total. Belgium won the series 3–2.

== Squads ==
Malta	Belgium
Bikram Arora (c); Waseem Abbas; Sujesh Appu; Samuel Aquilina; Ashok Bishnoi; Gopal Chaturvedi; Heinrich Gericke (wk); Zeeshan Khan; Niraj Khanna; Haroon Mughal; Bilal Muhammad; Amar Sharma; Ravinder Singh; Samuel Stanislaus; Varun Thamotharam	Shaheryar Butt (c); Khalid Ahmadi; Saqlain Ali; Murid Ekrami; Said Hakim; Sazzad Hosen; Syed Jamil (wk); Mamoon Latif; Nemish Mehta; Sherul Mehta (wk); Muhammad Muneeb; Burhan Niaz; Ashiqullah Said; Sheraz Sheikh; Hadisullah Tarakhel; Wahidullah Usmani; Saber Zakhil

== T20I series ==
=== 1st T20I ===
8 July 2021
09:30
Scorecard

Belgium; 99 (20 overs)	v	Malta; 103/4 (16.2 overs)
Muhammad Muneeb 30 (44); Waseem Abbas 3/22 (4 overs)		Niraj Khanna 35* (24); Ashiqullah Said 2/27 (4 overs)

Malta won by 6 wickets
Marsa Sports Club, Marsa
Umpires: Abdul Rahman (Mlt) and Tim Wheeler (Mlt)
Player of the match: Niraj Khanna (Mlt)

- Belgium won the toss and elected to bat.
- Ashok Bishnoi, Bilal Muhammad (Mlt) and Hadisullah Tarakhel (Bel) all made their T20I debuts.
- Waseem Abbas became the first bowler for Malta to take a hat-trick in T20Is.

=== 2nd T20I ===
8 July 2021
14:30
Scorecard

Malta; 50 (13 overs)	v	Belgium; 52/0 (5.3 overs)
Varun Thamotharam 15 (14); Burhan Niaz 4/8 (4 overs)		Hadisullah Tarakhel 45* (21)

Belgium won by 10 wickets
Marsa Sports Club, Marsa
Umpires: Abdul Rahman (Mlt) and Ghose Roy (Mlt)
Player of the match: Burhan Niaz (Bel)

- Malta won the toss and elected to bat.
- Said Hakim, Burhan Niaz and Sheraz Sheikh (Bel) all made their T20I debuts.

=== 3rd T20I ===
9 July 2021
13:00
Scorecard

Malta; 114/9 (20 overs)	v	Belgium; 115/6 (18.3 overs)
Samuel Stanislaus 35 (42); Sheraz Sheikh 3/22 (3 overs)		Saber Zakhil 32 (19); Bilal Muhammad 2/21 (4 overs)

Belgium won by 4 wickets
Marsa Sports Club, Marsa
Umpires: Aaftab Alam Khan (Mlt) and Ghose Roy (Mlt)
Player of the match: Sheraz Sheikh (Bel)

- Belgium won the toss and elected to field.
- Sheraz Sheikh became the first bowler for Belgium to take a hat-trick in T20Is.

=== 4th T20I ===
10 July 2021
09:30
Scorecard

Belgium; 128 (19.3 overs)	v	Malta; 130 (19.2 overs)
Sherul Mehta 40 (56); Waseem Abbas 4/23 (4 overs)		Samuel Stanislaus 34 (35); Ashiqullah Said 3/21 (4 overs)

Malta won by penalty runs
Marsa Sports Club, Marsa
Umpires: Aaftab Alam Khan (Mlt) and Ghose Roy (Mlt)
Player of the match: Bilal Muhammad (Mlt)

- Belgium won the toss and elected to bat.
- Malta were awarded five penalty runs after being bowled out in the second innings due to a breach of the code of conduct by Belgium captain Shaheryar Butt.

=== 5th T20I ===
10 July 2021
14:30
Scorecard

Belgium; 172/6 (20 overs)	v	Malta; 133 (18.4 overs)
Hadisullah Tarakhel 78 (40); Waseem Abbas 2/23 (4 overs)		Heinrich Gericke 55 (33); Saber Zakhil 3/28 (4 overs)

Belgium won by 39 runs
Marsa Sports Club, Marsa
Umpires: Aaftab Alam Khan (Mlt) and Abdul Rahman (Mlt)
Player of the match: Saber Zakhil (Bel)

- Belgium won the toss and elected to bat.
