= 2006 ball-tampering controversy =

International Test cricket controversy

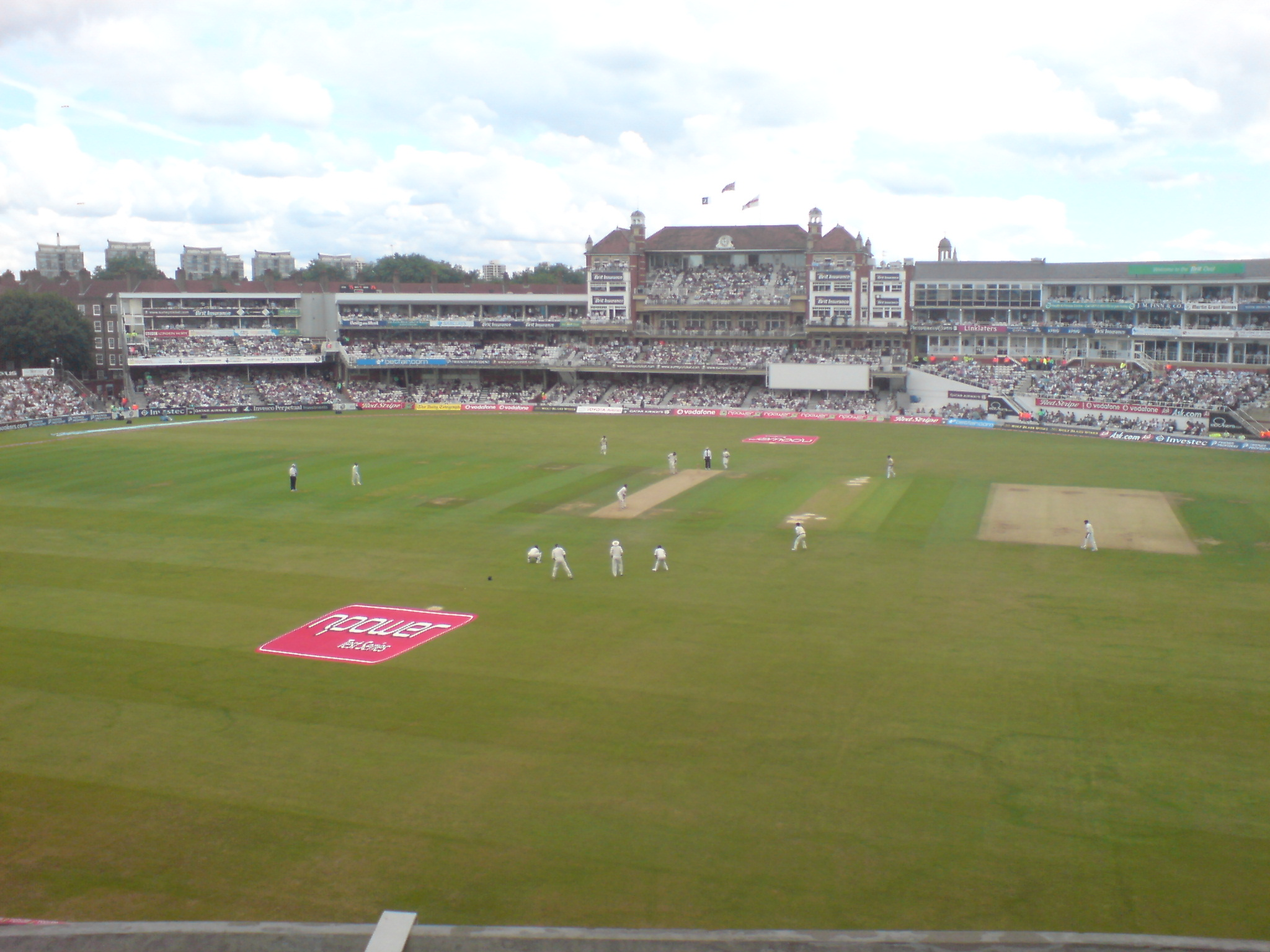
England batting on the first day of the Test

In 2006, during the fourth day of the fourth Test between England and Pakistan at The Oval, umpires Darrell Hair and Billy Doctrove ruled that the Pakistani team had been involved in ball tampering. The Pakistani players refused to take the field after the tea break in protest of the decision. After waiting two more minutes the umpires removed the bails and declared England winners by forfeiture. This was the first such end to a Test match in more than 1,000 Tests.

The International Cricket Council (ICC), England and Wales Cricket Board (ECB) and Pakistan Cricket Board (PCB) later affirmed that the decision to award the match to England was in accordance with the Laws of Cricket. After the game, an email was leaked showing that Hair had offered his resignation from the ICC Elite Umpire Panel in return for a non-negotiable one-off payment of US$500,000. Hair said that the ICC had been in negotiations with him prior to the incident.

The ICC match referee Ranjan Madugalle later acquitted Pakistan captain Inzamam-ul-Haq of a ball-tampering charge, but banned him for four one day internationals for bringing the game into disrepute. After the hearing the ICC announced that Hair would not be umpiring at the 2006 ICC Champions Trophy because of security concerns. Hair was later banned from officiating in international matches by the ICC: they stated that although Hair had been banned from Tests, there is "no issue" with the result of the Oval Test match. In the aftermath of the Oval incident, Hair was voted Umpire of the Season in a poll carried out by The Wisden Cricketer, with more than a third of the votes. A leaked ICC report showed that immediately before the Oval incident, Hair was ranked the second-best umpire in the world overall behind Simon Taufel and number one in terms of decision-making statistics.

In 2007 Hair announced he was suing the ICC and PCB on grounds of racial discrimination, alleging that he was made a scapegoat when he was barred from officiating Test matches after the Oval Test, as no action was taken against his fellow umpire Billy Doctrove. He later dropped the discrimination case. The ICC restored Hair to the Elite Umpiring Panel in 2008 but he resigned five months later, having officiated in only two further Tests.

== Incident ==
On 20 August 2006, during the fourth day of the fourth Test between England and Pakistan at The Oval, umpires Darrell Hair and Billy Doctrove ruled that the Pakistani team had been involved in ball tampering. They awarded five penalty runs to England and offered them a replacement ball. The Pakistani players refused to take the field after the tea break in protest at the decision. The umpires left the field, directed the Pakistani players to resume play and returned once more 15 minutes later. After waiting two more minutes the umpires removed the bails and declared England winners by forfeiture. This was the first such end to a Test match in more than 1,000 Test matches. The Pakistani team did take to the field 25 minutes later – 55 minutes after the umpires first took to the field for a resumption of play – but Hair and Doctrove pointed out that the game had already ended with a Pakistani forfeiture the moment the bails were removed, even though both teams were willing to continue the match. The Test was abandoned, with the match awarded to England.

== Reaction ==
The International Cricket Council (ICC), England and Wales Cricket Board (ECB) and Pakistan Cricket Board (PCB) later affirmed that the decision to award the match to England was in accordance with the laws of cricket. However, it caused much debate in the cricketing world, with former cricketer Michael Atherton criticising Hair for not continuing the game. Nasser Hussain agreed with Pakistan captain Inzamam-ul-Haq, saying that he would have done exactly what Inzamam did, while Steve Waugh backed the umpires' decision, saying "No-one is bigger than the game. The laws are there for a reason." Michael Holding described the umpires' initial penalty for ball tampering as "insensitive" and said that every law has room for flexibility. Imran Khan called Hair an "umpiring fundamentalist", and commented that "Such characters court controversy", while Wasim Akram called for Hair to be sacked.

It was revealed in an ICC news conference on 25 August that after the game, Hair had offered his resignation from the ICC Elite Umpire Panel. In an e-mail entitled "The Way Forward" addressed to Doug Cowie, the ICC's umpire manager, and with apparent reference to an earlier conversation between the two which had not been made public by the ICC, Hair stated he would resign from his position in return for a non-negotiable one-off payment of US$500,000 directly into Hair's bank account. This was to be kept confidential by both teams. Hair was in contract with the ICC until March 2008, and the payment was said to compensate for the loss of future earnings and retainer payments. He subsequently revoked this offer. Hair had stated that the suggested sum was to be compensation for the four or more years he would have umpired for had the controversy not happened, which he claimed would be "the best years he had to offer international umpiring". Hair had previously suggested, however, in an April 2006 interview that he might give up umpiring at the end of the World Cup saying "I'm not so sure that after another 12 months I'll have the passion to keep enjoying it." In the press conference, the ICC's chairman Malcolm Speed did not offer any assurances about Hair's future.

On 27 August, Hair responded to the release of the e-mails by stating that the ICC had been in negotiations with him prior to him sending them. He was quoted as saying: "During an extended conversation with Mr. Cowie, I was invited to make a written offer. The figure in the e-mail correspondence was in line with those canvassed with the ICC." The ICC however denied they had invited a claim. In a press conference on 28 September 2006 Hair reiterated that he never considered retirement.

== ICC hearing ==
On 28 September, the ICC match referee Ranjan Madugalle chaired the hearing into Inzamam's case and acquitted him of the ball-tampering charge stating, "Having regard to the seriousness of the allegation of ball-tampering [it is an allegation of cheating], I am not satisfied on the balance of probabilities that there is sufficiently cogent evidence that the fielding team had taken action likely to interfere with the condition of the ball" in his official report, but banned him for four One Day Internationals for bringing the game into disrepute. Each of the ICC-appointed match officials (Hair, Doctrove, Cowie, Trevor Jesty, Mike Procter, and Peter Hartley) were of the opinion that markings on the ball indicated tampering. However retired cricketer Geoffrey Boycott, testifying before the panel, stated "That's a good ball, not just a playable ball." Another witness, TV analyst Simon Hughes, testified that Hair was "guessing", and the ball was in "pretty good condition", when he examined it. At a press conference after the hearing, PCB's chairman Shahryar Khan revealed that his board had not ruled out calling for charges of bringing the game into disrepute against Hair. Following the hearing, the ICC announced that Hair would not be umpiring at the 2006 ICC Champions Trophy because of security concerns. The Board of Control for Cricket in India (BCCI) stated that they were bothered by the controversy surrounding Hair rather than any security issues, but Malcolm Speed wrote that these had been raised by independent advisors.

== Ban ==
On 4 November 2006, Hair was banned from officiating in international matches by the ICC following a two-day meeting held by the ICC. The announcement was made by ICC President Percy Sonn in Mumbai, India, in a press conference.

"He shall not be allowed to officiate in any future international games until the end of this contract [which ends in March 2008]" Percy Sonn, ICC President

Both Malcolm Speed, CEO of the ICC, and Sonn, stated that although Hair has been banned from tests, there is "no issue" with the result of the Oval Test match, which Pakistan forfeited. The decision was met with praise from the Pakistani board, who had previously called for Hair to be sacked. It was widely rumoured on 3 November 2006, that Hair was going to be banned, after a "reliable source" leaked information to an Indian television network. The unnamed source said that 10 test playing nations voted on whether Hair should be allowed to continue, with the West Indies, India, Pakistan, Sri Lanka, Zimbabwe, South Africa and Bangladesh all voting for Hair to be removed, while England, Australia and New Zealand supported him. The voting at the decision to ban Hair was seen by some to reflect the perception of Hair in different countries. Most Asian commentators welcomed the move. Javed Miandad said that such a move by ICC sets an example that meant "all other umpires will be under pressure to take the right decisions" and Bangladesh captain Habibul Bashar also supported the decision. The former Sri Lankan captain Arjuna Ranatunga welcomed the decision to ban Hair, commenting that "Hair had a prejudice against Asian teams. I am happy that he is finally out. The decision will do good to future cricket."

The majority of criticism against the decision to ban Hair from matches involving test nations has come from his home country of Australia. Ricky Ponting said he was surprised by the ICC's move to ban Hair and Cricket Australia demanded the ICC explain the reasons for Hair being stood down. Cricket Australia chief executive James Sutherland said "Umpires need to have confidence in the system – that they are supported by best-practice administration and processes." The Australian media has also been critical of the decision. News Corp's Robert Craddock said, "Having seen how brutally Hair was abandoned after his tough call, only a brave or foolish umpire would be courageous enough to throw himself into the lion's den."

At the time, Hair had not ruled out taking legal action after the decision. Billy Doctrove, the other umpire during the Oval Test, is unaffected by the ICC's ban on Hair, though he was overlooked for the 2006 ICC Champions Trophy.

In the aftermath of the Oval incident Hair was voted Umpire of the Season in a poll carried out by The Wisden Cricketer, with more than a third of the votes. A leaked ICC report showed that immediately before the Oval incident, Hair was ranked the second-best umpire in the world overall after umpire Simon Taufel and number one in terms of decision-making statistics.

== Racial discrimination allegations ==
In February 2007, Hair announced he was suing the ICC and the Pakistan Cricket Board on grounds of racial discrimination. Hair alleged that he was made a scapegoat when he was barred from officiating Test matches after the forfeited Oval Test, as no action was taken against his fellow umpire Billy Doctrove.

In a statement issued via his solicitor, Hair said:

"I can confirm I have instructed my lawyers, Finers Stephens Innocent, 179 Portland Street, London, to issue an application to the London Central Employment Tribunal alleging racial discrimination from the International Cricket Council and the Pakistan Cricket Board. Therefore it is inappropriate for me to make further comment as this matter is yet to be determined by the tribunal."

"I haven't spoken to anybody about this. I hope you understand that I haven't released any information about this. Somebody else obviously has. I've got no idea who but I value confidentially, unfortunately I've discovered other people don't."

In response to this move by Hair, PCB chairman Nasim Ashraf said "Mr Hair was removed from the ICC panel of umpires because of his bad umpiring and his poor judgement."

In a statement in reply to the notification of Hair against PCB, Ashraf further went on to say

"It is crass for him to say a black West Indian was let off [whereas] he was a white man and therefore he was charged. Mr Hair was the senior umpire and he literally took over that Oval cricket match. I was present there. "There was only one man that evening that did not want cricket to be played. [It was] a black spot on the history of cricket thanks to Mr Hair."

However, on 9 October 2007 Hair dropped his discrimination case. The ICC said Hair would undergo a development programme over the next six months seemingly with the goal to place him back into top level matches. During this six-month period he would continue to officiate in second tier ICC associate matches. The ICC restored Hair to the Elite Umpiring Panel on 12 March 2008. However, on 22 August 2008 Hair handed in his resignation to the ICC to take up a coaching role, after he had only officiated in two Tests, in May and June 2008 between England and New Zealand. He had been an international umpire for 16 years.
