= Cow corner =

Cricket terminology

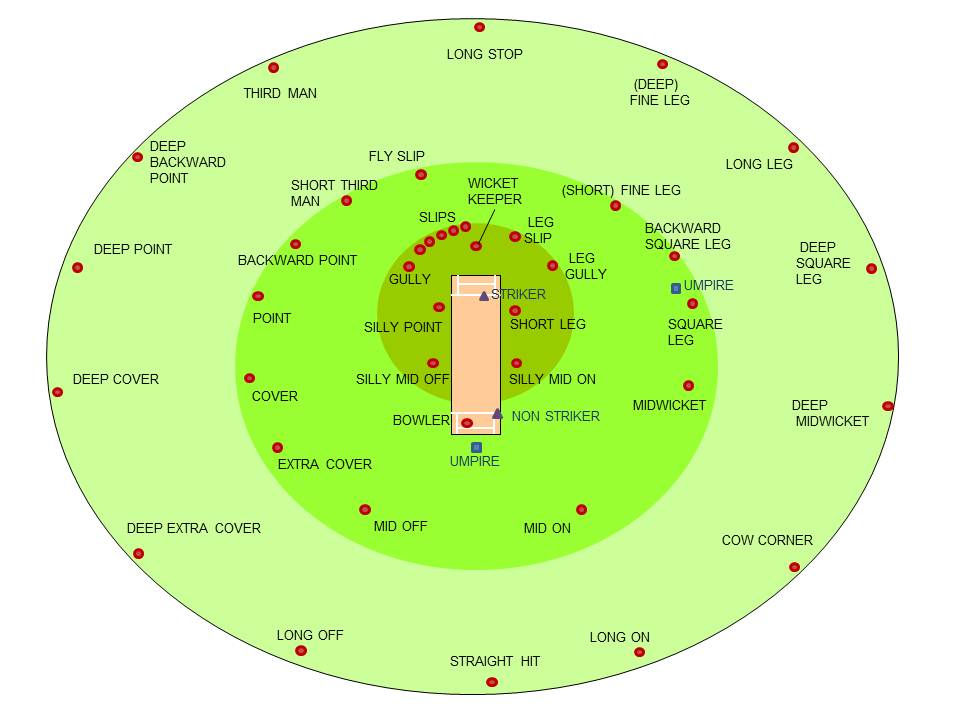
Fielding positions for a right-handed batsman. Cow corner is to the bottom right.

Cow corner is a region of the field in cricket.

The location of cow corner depends on a batsman's handedness, but it is always a part of the field in the deep on the batsman's leg side, typically stretching between deep-midwicket and long on. The diagram shows the location of cow corner for a right-handed batsman.

Cow corner is thought to be named after an area on the ground at Dulwich College where cattle would often graze. This has led to the naming of Cow shots, which are wild and risky shots that tend to end up at cow corner, and are considered to be mostly played by players with little knowledge of, or ability to apply, the more difficult techniques of the game. Such players were supposed to be particularly prominent in the type of cricket played in rural or agricultural areas, where players did not have exposure to more sophisticated methods of playing. Such shots are also called agricultural.

This region of the field has been somewhat more frequented in more recent forms of the game, including T20 matches, as batsmen have had to find ways to hit the ball to the boundary even for yorker-length deliveries. Shots such as the "slog sweep" popularised by Steve Waugh and baseball style crossbat 'swipes' are often utilised to hit the ball in the Deep Midwicket and Cow Corner areas of the field.

== See also ==
- Cricket terminology
- Leg side
- Fielding (cricket)
- Batting (cricket)
