= Batting (cricket) =

Cricket terminology

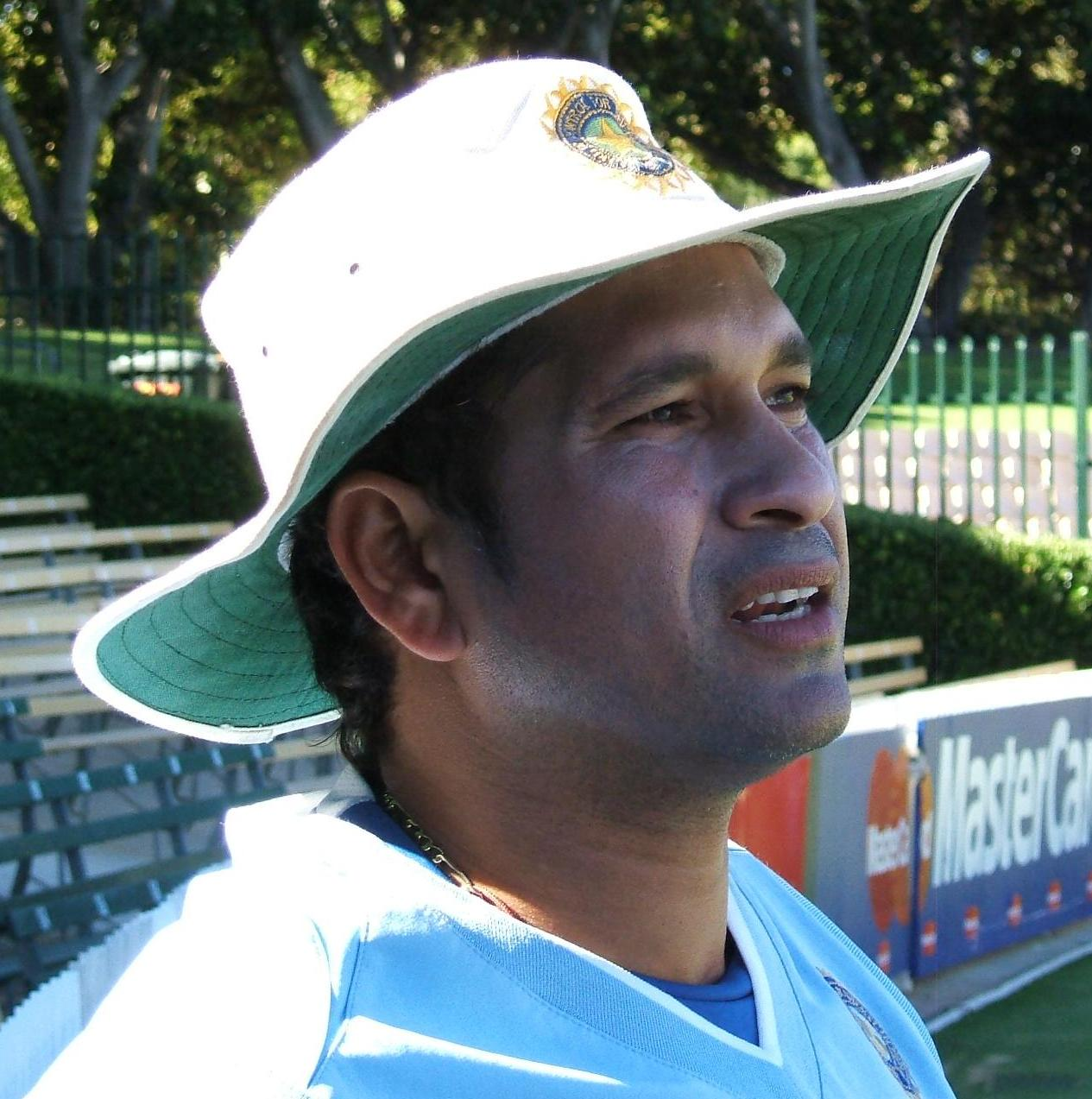
Sachin Tendulkar is the highest run scorer in men's international cricket.

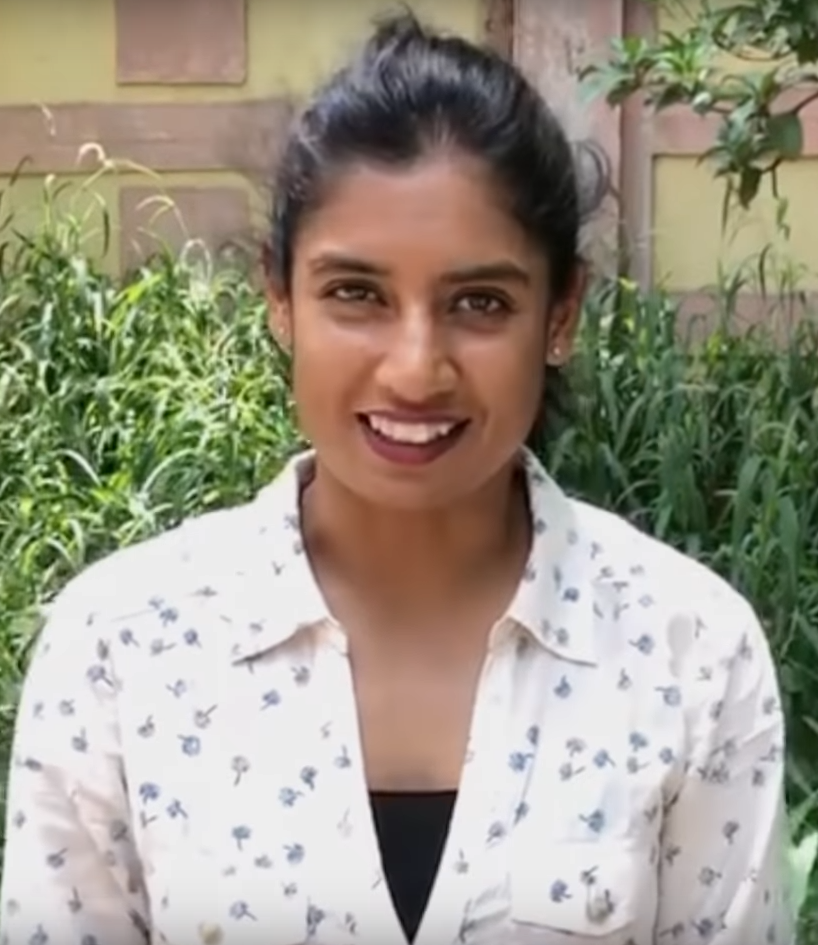
Mithali Raj is the highest run scorer in women's international cricket.

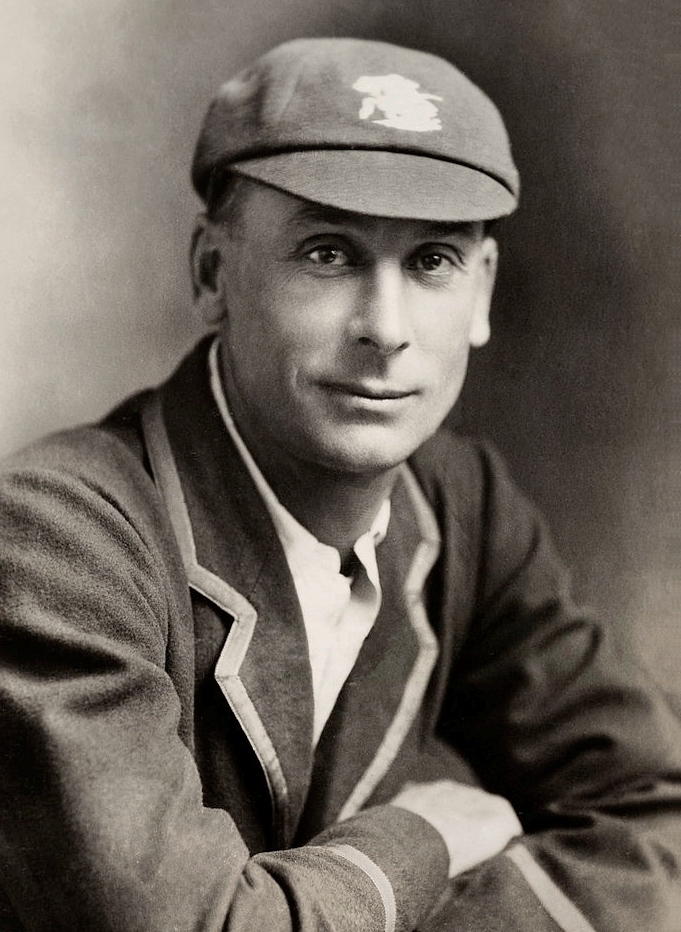
Jack Hobbs is the highest run scorer in first-class cricket.

In cricket, batting is the act or skill of hitting the ball with a bat to score runs and prevent the loss of one's wicket. Any player who is currently batting is, since September 2021, officially referred to as a batter regardless of whether batting is their particular area of expertise. Historically, batsman and batswoman were used, and these terms remain in widespread use. Batters have to adapt to various conditions when playing on different cricket pitches, especially in different countries; therefore, as well as having outstanding physical batting skills, top-level batters will have quick reflexes, excellent decision-making skills, and be good strategists.

During an innings two members of the batting side are on the pitch at any time: the one facing the current delivery from the bowler is called the striker, while the other is the non-striker. When a batter is out, they are replaced by a teammate. This continues until the end of the innings, which in most cases is when 10 of the team members are out, whereupon the other team gets a turn to bat.

Batting tactics and strategy vary depending on the type of match being played as well as the current state of play. The main concerns for the batters are not to lose their wicket and to score as many runs as quickly as possible. These objectives generally conflict—to score quickly, risky shots must be played, increasing the chance that the batter will be dismissed, while the batter's safest choice with a careful wicket-guarding stroke may be not to attempt any runs at all. Depending on the situation, batters may abandon attempts at run-scoring in an effort to preserve their wicket, or may attempt to score runs as quickly as possible with scant concern for the possibility of being dismissed. Unlike various other bat-and-ball sports, cricket batters may hit the ball in any direction to score runs, and can use creative shots to do so.

As with all other cricket statistics, batting statistics and records are given much attention and provide a measure of a player's effectiveness. The main statistic for batting is a player's batting average. This is calculated by dividing the number of runs they have scored by the number of times they have been dismissed (not by the number of innings they have played).

== Terminology ==
Any player, regardless of their area of special skill, is referred to as a "batter" (historically as a "batsman" or "batswoman") while they are batting. The batter's act of hitting the ball is called a "shot" or "stroke". A player who is selected for the team mainly for their batting skill is often referred to as simply a batter, regardless of whether they are currently batting, or sometimes as a specialist batter. A specialist bowler or wicket-keeper, on the other hand, would only be referred to as a batter when they are actually batting.

In 2021, the Laws of Cricket were amended to officially use the term "batter" for gender neutrality, and this is increasingly the preferred term in some media outlets.

== Orthodox technique and stroke play ==
Names of orthodox cricket shots and the directions in which they are hit for a right-handed batter. The batter is standing at the center point facing south. The positions are mirrored for left-handers.

A standard batting technique has been developed which is used by most batters. Technique refers to the batter's stance before the ball is bowled as well as the movement of the hands, feet, head, and body in the execution of a cricket stroke. Good technique is characterised by quickly getting into the correct position to play the shot, especially getting one's head and body in line with the ball, one's feet placed next to where the ball would bounce and then swinging the bat at the ball to make contact at the precise moment required for the particular stroke being played.

The movement of the batter for a particular delivery depends on the shot being attempted. Front-foot shots are played with the weight on the front foot (left foot for a right-hander) and are usually played when the ball is pitched up to the batter, while back-foot shots are played putting the weight onto the back foot, usually to bowling that is pitched short. Shots may also be referred to as vertical or straight-bat shots, in which the bat is swung vertically at the ball (e.g. when playing a drive or leg glance), or horizontal or cross-bat shots, in which the bat is swung horizontally at the ball (e.g. when playing the pull or cut shot).

While a batter is not limited in where or how they may hit the ball, the development of good technique has gone hand in hand with the development of a standard or orthodox cricket shots played to specific types of deliveries. These "textbook" shots are standard material found in many coaching manuals.

The advent of limited overs cricket, with its emphasis on rapid run-scoring, has led to increasing use of unorthodox shots to hit the ball into gaps where there are no fielders. Unorthodox shots are typically—but not always—more high-risk than orthodox shots due to some aspects of good batting technique being abandoned.

=== Stance ===
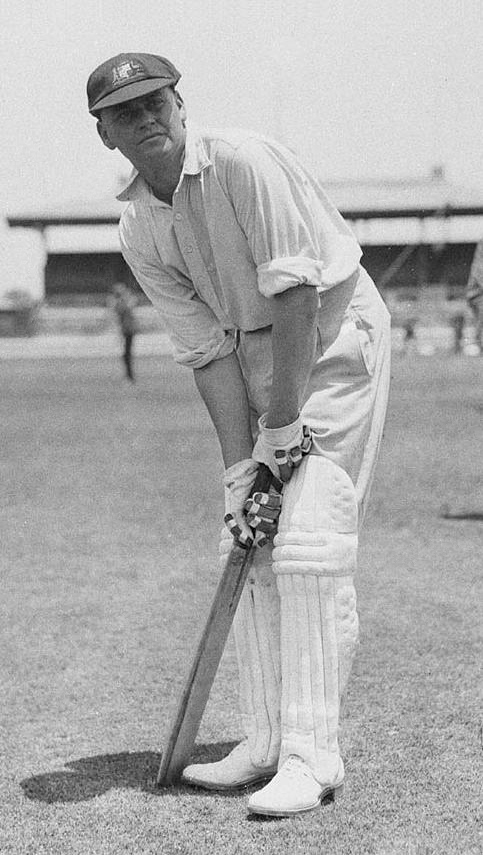
Bill Woodfull's stance

The stance is the position in which a batter stands to have the ball bowled to them. An ideal stance is "comfortable, relaxed and balanced", with the feet 40 centimetres (16 in) apart, parallel and astride the crease. Additionally, the front shoulder should be pointing down the wicket, the head facing the bowler, the weight equally balanced and the bat near the back toe. A slight crouch is adopted in order to be in a more effective striking posture whilst also isometrically loading the muscles; this allows the stroke to be played more dynamically. As the ball is about to be released, the batter will lift their bat up behind in anticipation of playing a stroke and will shift their weight onto the balls of their feet. By doing this they are ready to move swiftly into position to address the ball once they see its path out of the bowler's hand.

Although the textbook, side-on stance is the most common, a few international players, such as Shivnarine Chanderpaul and Steve Smith, use an "open" or "square on" stance.

=== Backlift ===
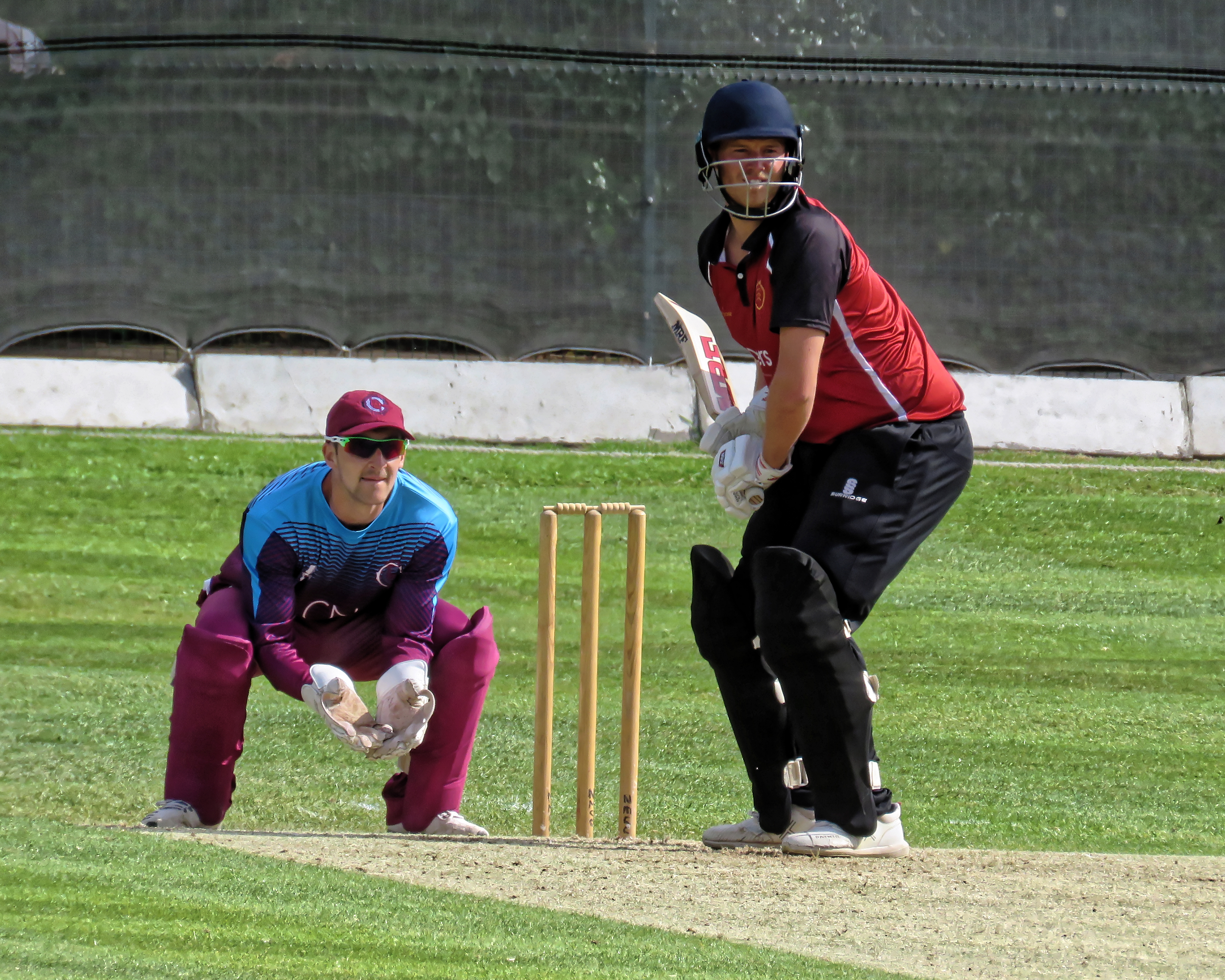
A right-handed batter lifts his bat in preparation for hitting the ball.

Backlift is how a batter lifts their bat in preparation for hitting the ball. While the bat should be raised as vertically as possible, coaching manuals often suggest that correct technique is for the bat to be slightly angled from the perpendicular; a common instruction is to point the face of the bat in the direction of first or second slip. Some players (notably, in recent times, Brian Lara, Virender Sehwag) have employed an exaggerated backlift. Others, who have employed the more unorthodox open stance, such as Peter Willey, had a more abbreviated backlift.

=== Forward and back ===
Depending upon the path of the ball, the batter will either move forward or back in their attempt to intercept it. A forward movement is designated a front foot shot, whereas a backward movement is designated a back foot shot. A front foot shot is typically used to address a ball arriving at between ankle and thigh height. The batter will step forward towards the ball, bending their front knee to bring the bat down to the anticipated height of the ball. By moving forward, the batter is also able to intercept the ball immediately after it has pitched, thus nullifying any potentially dangerous lateral movement. A back foot shot is typically used to address a ball arriving at between thigh and head height. The batter will step back and, if necessary, stand on their tiptoes to raise the bat to the height of the ball. By stepping back towards the wicket, the batter also receives the advantage of having an extra small amount of time to react to any unexpected lateral movement or variation in bounce.

== Cricket shots ==
=== Vertical-bat strokes ===
Vertical-bat or straight-bat shots can be played off either the front foot or the back foot depending upon the anticipated height of the ball at the moment it reaches the batter. The characteristic position of the bat is a vertical alignment at the point of contact. Vertical-bat shots are typically played with the batter's head directly above the point of contact so they are able to accurately judge the line of the ball. At this point, the bat can either be stationary and facing straight back down the wicket – known as a block or defensive shot; angled to one side – known as a glance or deflection; or travelling forwards towards the bowler – known as a drive.

==== Defensive shot ====
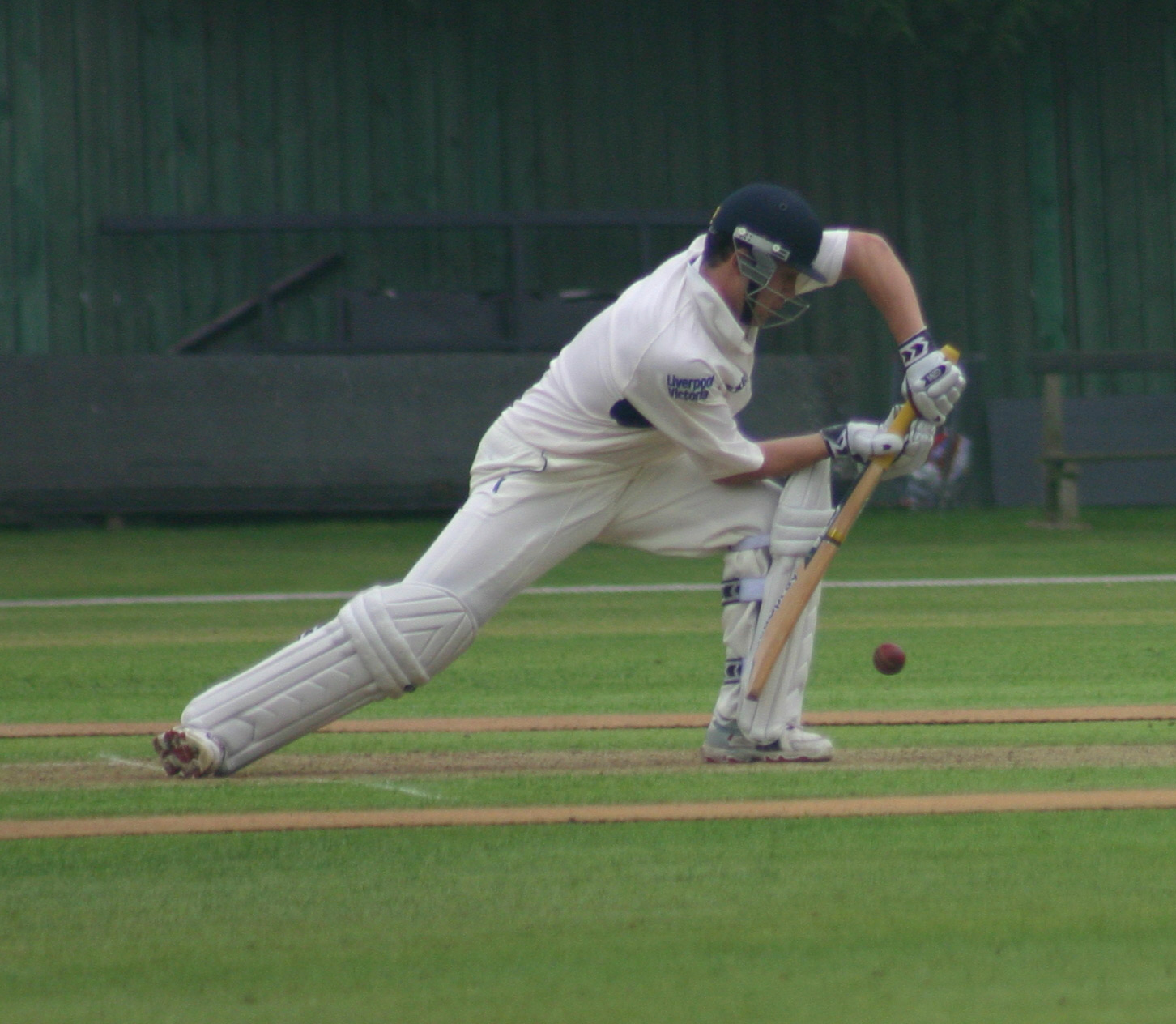
Having taken a long stride, a batter (Jonathan Trott) blocks the ball with a forward defensive shot.

A block stroke is usually a purely defensive stroke designed to stop the ball from hitting the wicket or the batter's body. This shot has no strength behind it and is usually played with a light or "soft" grip (commentators often refer to "soft hands") and merely stops the ball moving towards the wicket. A block played on the front foot is known as a forward defensive, while that played on the back foot is known as a backward defensive. These strokes may be used to score runs, by manipulating the block to move the ball into vacant portions of the infield, in which case a block becomes a "push". Pushing the ball is one of the more common ways batters manipulate the strike.

Leaving and blocking are employed much more often in first-class cricket (including Test matches), as there is no requirement to score runs as quickly as possible, thus allowing the batter to choose which deliveries to play.

A leg glance is a delicate straight-batted shot played at a ball aimed slightly on the leg side, using the bat to flick the ball as it passes the batter, and requiring some wrist work as well, deflecting towards the square leg or fine leg area. The stroke involves deflecting the bat-face towards the leg side at the last moment, head and body moving inside the line of the ball. This shot is played "off the toes, shins or hip". It is played off the front foot if the ball is pitched up at the toes or shin of the batter, or off the back foot if the ball bounces at waist/hip height to the batter. Although the opposite term off glance is not employed within cricket, the concept of angling the bat face towards the offside to deflect the ball away from the wicket for the purpose of scoring runs through the off side is a commonly used technique. This would commonly be described instead as "running (or steering) the ball down to the third man".

===== Leave =====
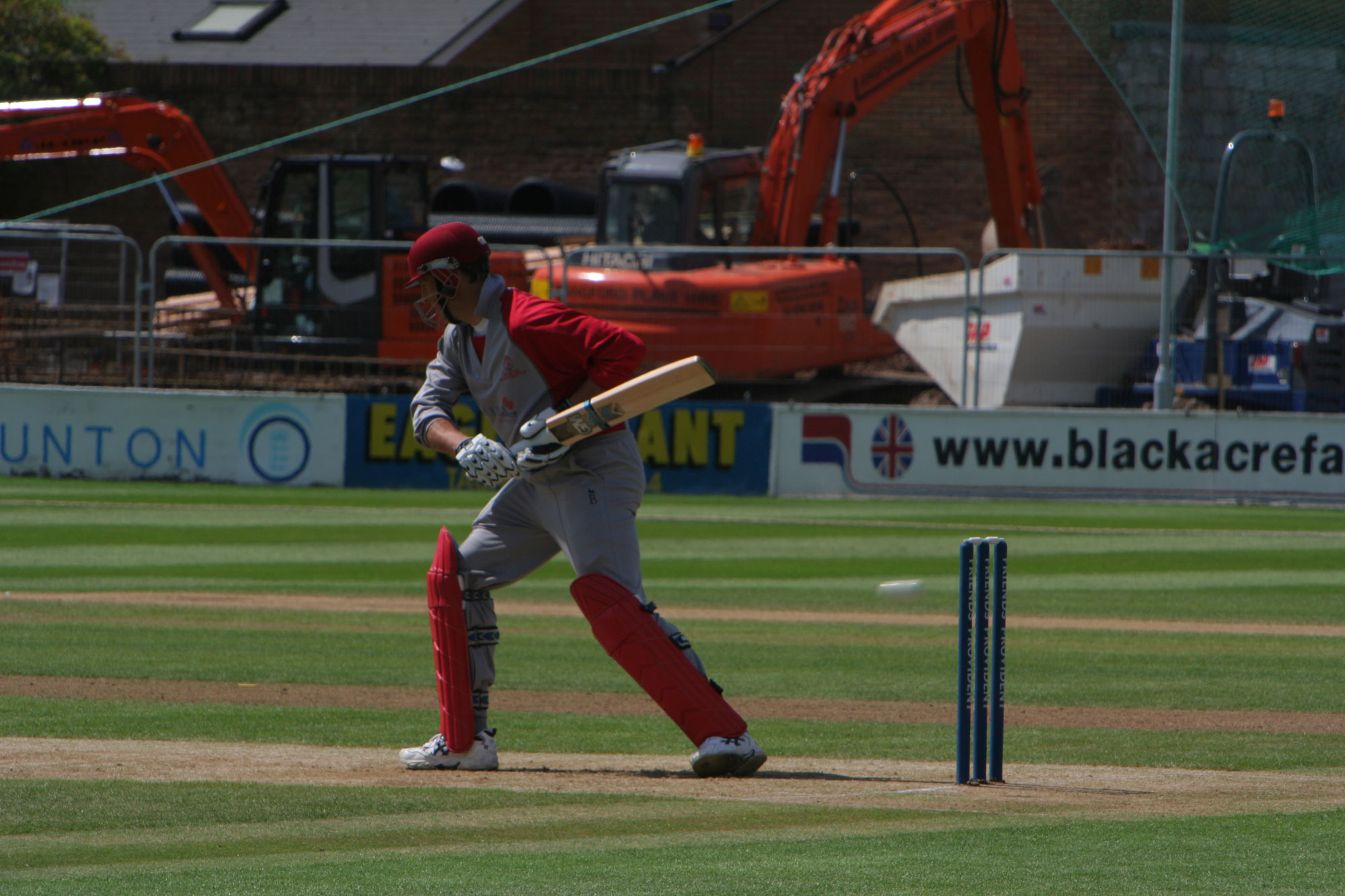
The leave. Note the batter's head focussed on where the ball had bounced. The bat and hands are held well out of the way of the ball.

The leave is sometimes considered a cricket shot, even though the batter physically does not even touch the ball as it passes them. The leave is often used by a batter during the first few balls they receive, to give them time to judge the conditions of the pitch and the bowling before attempting to play a shot. Leaving a delivery is a matter of judgement and technique. The batter still has to watch the ball closely to ensure that it will not hit them or the wicket; they also have to ensure that their bat and hands are kept out of the path of the ball so that it cannot make accidental contact and possibly lead to them being out caught. Batters only leave the ball when they are certain that it will not hit the stumps.

==== Straight Drive ====
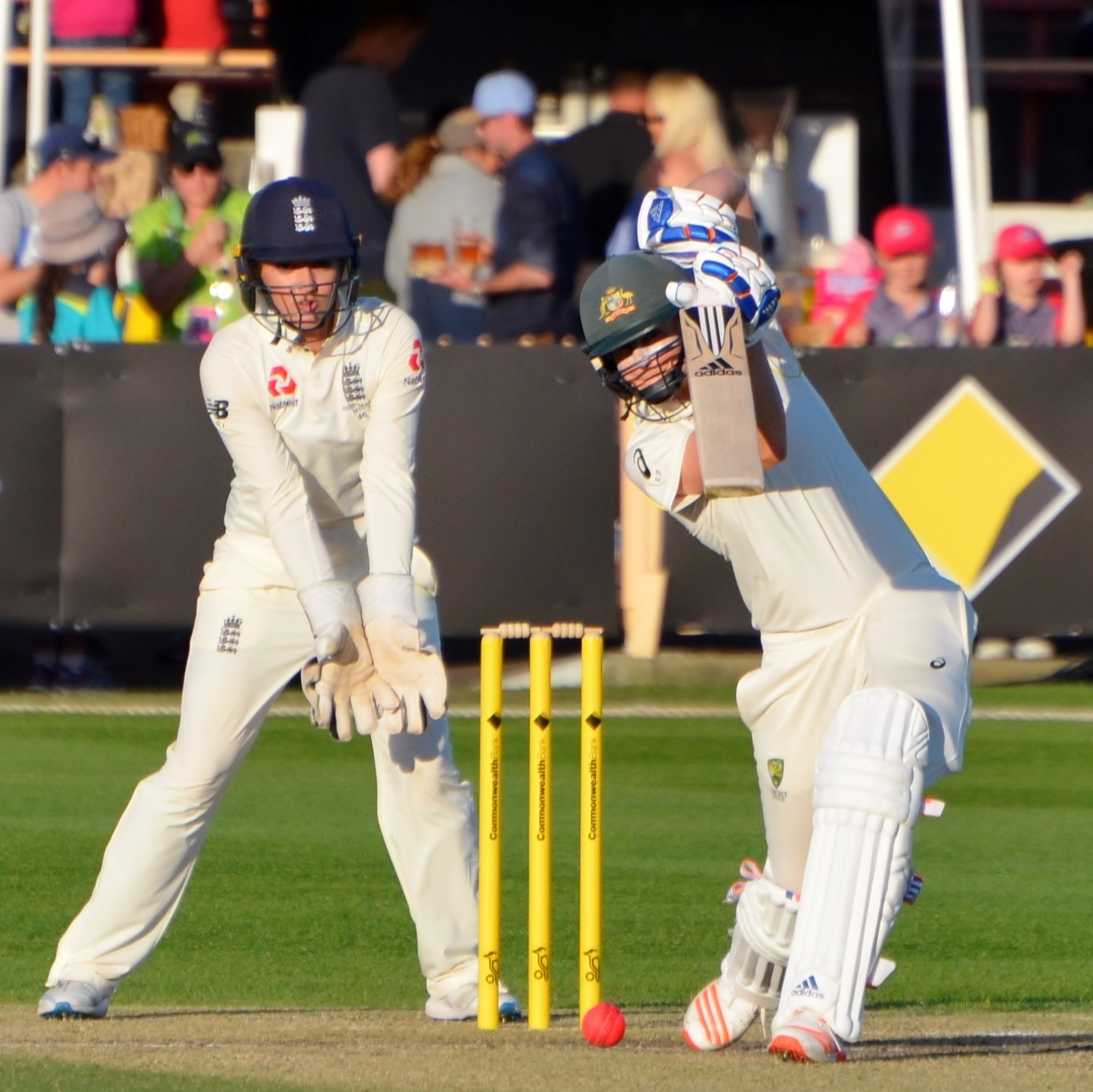
Ellyse Perry plays an off drive off the front foot. Note her stance and position of her hands, legs, body and head.

A drive is a straight-batted shot, played by swinging the bat in a vertical arc through the line of the ball, hitting the ball in front of the batter along the ground. It is one of the most common shots in a batter's armory and often the first shot taught to junior cricketers. Depending on the direction the ball travels, a drive can be a cover drive (struck towards the cover fielding position), an off drive (towards mid-off), straight drive (straight past the bowler), on drive (between stumps and mid-on) or square drive (towards point). A drive can also be played towards midwicket, although the phrase "midwicket drive" is not in common usage. Drives can be played both off the front and the back foot, but back-foot drives are harder to force through the line of the ball. Although most drives are deliberately struck along the ground to reduce the risk of being dismissed caught, a batter may decide to play a lofted drive to hit the ball over the infielders and potentially even over the boundary for six.

==== Flick ====
A flick shot is a shot played on the leg side by flicking a full-length delivery using the wrists. The shot is played with the bat coming through straight as for the on drive, but the bat face is angled towards the leg side. It can be played both off the front foot or the back foot, either off the toes or from the hips. The shot is played between the mid-on and square leg region. Typically played along the ground, the flick can also be played by lofting the ball over the infield.

=== Horizontal-bat shots ===
The second class of cricket stroke comprises the horizontal-bat shots, also known as cross-bat shots: the cut, the square drive, the pull, the hook, and the sweep. Typically, horizontal bat shots have a greater probability of failing to make contact with the ball than vertical bat shots and therefore are restricted to deliveries that are not threatening to hit the stumps, either by dint of being too wide or too short. The bat is swung in a horizontal arc, with the batter's head typically not being perfectly in line with the ball at the point of contact.

==== Cut ====
A cut is a cross-batted shot played at a short-pitched ball, placing it wide on the off side. The batter makes contact with the ball as it draws alongside or passes them and therefore requires virtually no effort on their part as they use the bowler's pace to divert the ball. A square cut is a shot hit into the off side at near to 90 degrees from the wicket (towards point). A late cut is played as or after the ball passes the batter's body and is hit towards the third man position. The cut shot is typically played off the back foot but is also sometimes played off the front foot against slower bowling. The cut should be played with the face of the bat rolling over the ball to face the ground thus pushing the ball downwards. A mistimed cut with an open-faced bat (with the face of the bat facing the bowler) will generally lead to the ball rising in the air, giving a chance for the batter to be caught.

==== Square drive ====
Although confusingly named a drive, the square drive is actually a horizontal bat shot, with identical arm mechanics to that of the square cut. The difference between the cut and the square drive is the height of the ball at contact: the cut is played to a ball bouncing waist high or above with the batting batter standing tall, whereas the square drive is played to a wide ball of shin height with the batter bending their knees and crouching low to make contact.

==== Pull and hook ====
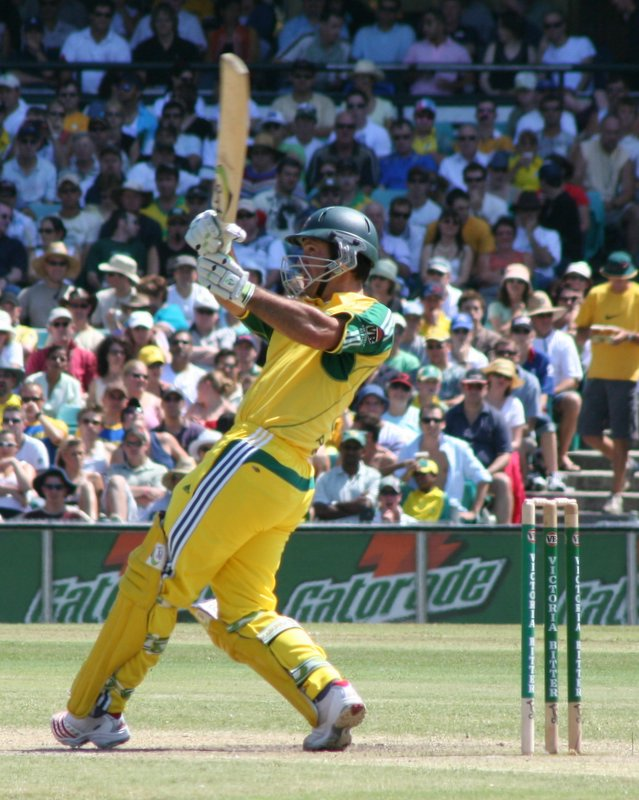
Ricky Ponting playing a pull shot

A pull is a cross-batted shot played to a ball bouncing around waist height by swinging the bat in a horizontal arc in front of the body, pulling it around to the leg side towards mid-wicket or square leg. The term hook shot is used when the shot is played against a ball bouncing at or above chest high to the batter, the batter thus "hooking" the ball around behind square leg, either along the ground or in the air. Pull and hook shots can be played off the front or back foot, with the back foot being more typical.

==== Sweep ====
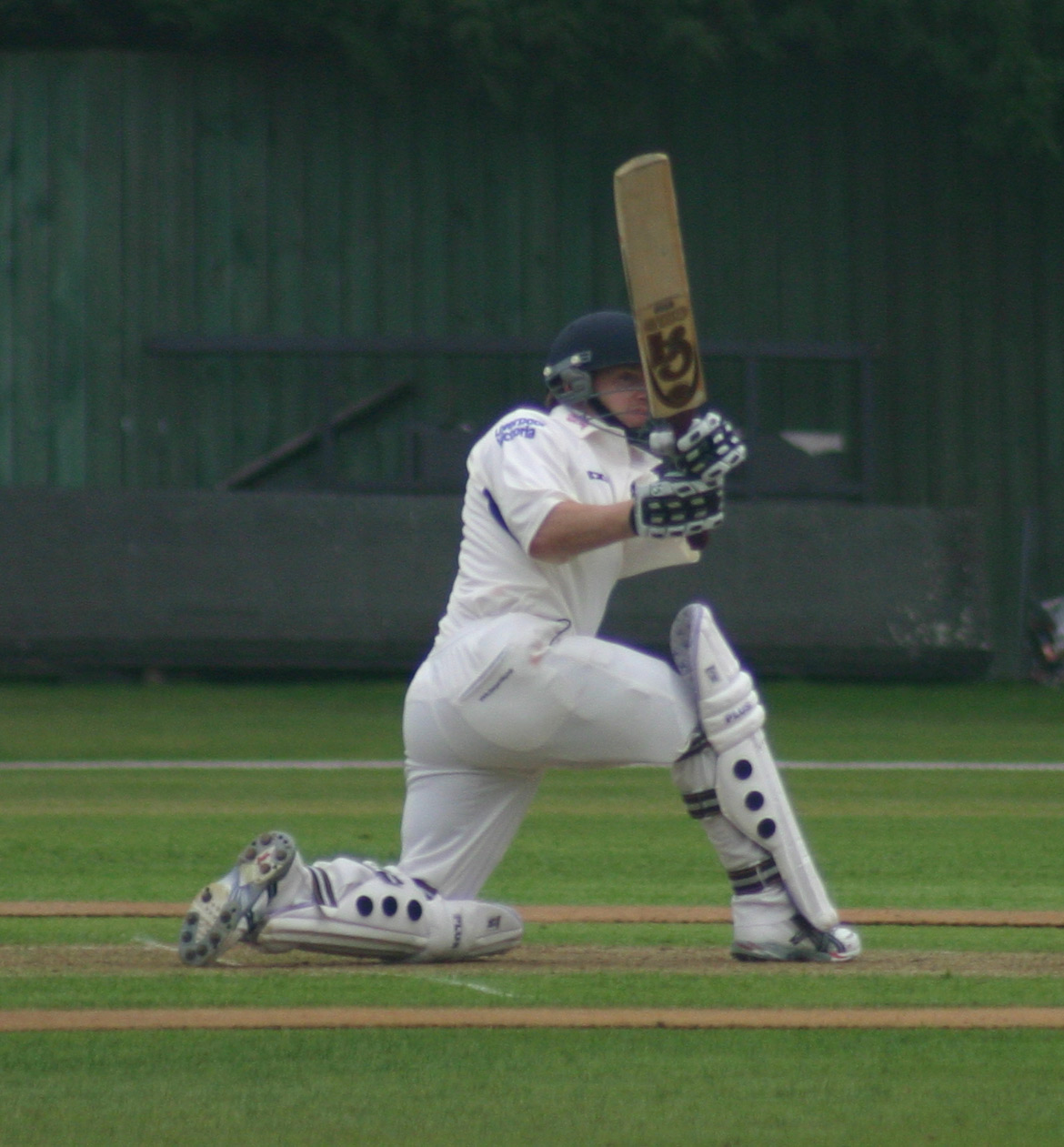
A left-handed batter plays a sweep shot.

A sweep is a cross-batted front foot shot played to a low bouncing ball, usually from a slow bowler (However, players like Mal Loye also play the sweep against fast bowlers), by kneeling on one knee, bringing the head down in line with the ball and swinging the bat around in a horizontal arc near the pitch as the ball arrives, sweeping it around to the leg side, typically towards square leg or fine leg. A paddle sweep shot is a sweep shot in which the ball is deflected towards fine leg with a stationary or near-stationary bat extended horizontally towards the bowler, whereas the hard sweep shot is played towards square leg with the bat swung firmly in a horizontal arc. Typically the sweep shot will be played to a legside delivery, but it is also possible for a batter to sweep the ball to the leg side from outside off stump. Attempting to sweep a full straight delivery on the stumps is generally not recommended because of the risk of lbw.

=== Unorthodox strokeplay ===
Since a batter is free to play any shot to any type of delivery as they wish, the above list is by no means a complete list of the strokes that batters choose to play. Many unorthodox, typically high-risk, shots have been used throughout the history of the game. The advent of limited overs cricket has seen the increased use of unorthodox shots to hit the ball into gaps where there are no fielders placed. Unorthodox shots are rarely used in first-class cricket as the pace of the game is slower and it is relatively more important to keep one's wicket than to try to score runs off every ball.

A few unorthodox shots have gained enough popularity or notoriety to have been given their own names and entered common usage.

==== Reverse sweep ====
A reverse sweep is a cross-batted sweep shot played in the opposite direction to the standard sweep, thus instead of sweeping the ball to the leg side, it is swept to the off side, towards a backward point or third man. The batter may also swap their hands on the bat handle to make the stroke easier to execute. The batter may also bring their back foot to the front, therefore, turning the shot into a switch-hit and making it more like a traditional sweep. The advantage of a reverse sweep is that it effectively reverses the fielding positions and thus is very difficult to set a field to. It is also a risky shot for the batter as it increases the chance of lbw and also is quite easy to top edge to a fielder.

It was first regularly played in the 1970s by the Pakistani batter Mushtaq Mohammad, though Mushtaq's brother Hanif Mohammad is sometimes credited as the inventor. Cricket coach Bob Woolmer has been credited with popularising the stroke. The most famous example of a reverse sweep backfiring was in the case of Mike Gatting of England against Allan Border of Australia in the 1987 Cricket World Cup Final. With England on course for victory, Gatting attempted a reverse sweep off the first delivery bowled by Border, top-edged the ball and was caught by wicketkeeper Greg Dyer. England subsequently lost momentum and eventually lost the match.

Because of the unorthodox nature of hand and body position, it is often difficult to get a lot of power behind a reverse sweep; in many situations, the intention is to glance or cut the ball to the back leg area. However, on rare occasions, players have been able to execute reverse sweeps for a six. Kevin Pietersen, who pioneered switch-hitting, is adept at this, but one could argue that the resulting shot is basically a sweep rather than a reverse sweep. A more classic example of such a shot would be Yusuf Pathan's six off Robin Peterson. South Africa's AB de Villiers is well known for his ability to hit sixes with the reverse sweep at ease and Glenn Maxwell also often plays the reverse sweep.

==== Slog and slog sweep ====
A slog is a powerful pull shot played over mid-wicket, usually, hit in the air in an attempt to score a six. A shot would be referred to as a slog when it is typically played at a delivery that would not ordinarily be pulled. A slog can also be described as hitting the ball to "cow corner". This phrase is designed to imply that the batter is unsophisticated in their stroke play and technique by suggesting they would be more at home playing on more rudimentary cricket fields in which there may be cows grazing along the boundary edge. The slog can be an effective shot because all the batter's power and body weight can be put into swinging the bat at the ball.

A slog sweep is a slog played from the kneeling position used to sweep. Slog sweeps are usually directed over square-leg rather than to mid-wicket. It is almost exclusively used against reasonably full-pitched balls from slow bowlers, as only then does the batter have time to sight the length and adopt the kneeling position required for the slog sweep. The front leg of the shot is usually placed wider outside leg stump to allow for a full swing of the bat.

==== Upper cut ====
An upper cut is a shot played towards third man, usually hit when the ball is pitched outside the off stump with extra bounce. It is a dangerous shot which can edge the ball to keeper or slips if not executed correctly. The shot is widely used in modern cricket. The shot is advantageous on fast bouncy tracks and is seen commonly in Twenty20 cricket. Notable players who used the upper cut include Sachin Tendulkar, Virender Sehwag and Brendan Taylor.

==== Switch hit ====
A switch hit is a shot where a batter changes their handedness and posture to adopt a stance the mirror image of their traditional handedness while the bowler is running in to bowl. As a fielding team cannot manoeuvre fielders while the bowler is in their run-up, the fielding side is effectively wrong-footed with the fielders out of position. The shot was pioneered by Kevin Pietersen, first performed off the bowling of Muttiah Muralitharan in England's 2006 home series against Sri Lanka. It was subsequently used in the New Zealand series in England in 2008 when Pietersen performed the shot twice in the same over against Scott Styris on his way to making an unbeaten century. David Warner, the Australian opener, is also a frequent user of the switch hit and used it to great effect against the Indian off-spinner Ravichandran Ashwin in the first Twenty20 of the Indian cricket team's tour to Australia 2012. Glenn Maxwell and Ben Stokes also play the switch hit.

The legality of the switch hit was questioned when first introduced but cleared by the International Cricket Council as legal. The shot is risky because a batter is less proficient in the other handedness and is more likely to make a mistake in the execution of the shot.

==== Scoop / ramp ====
A scoop shot has been used by a number of first-class players. It is played to short-pitched straight balls that would traditionally be defended or, more aggressively, pulled to the leg side. To play a scoop shot, the batter is on the front foot and aims to get beneath the bounce of the ball and hit it directly behind the stumps, up and over the wicket-keeper.

This shot, though risky in the execution, has the advantage of being aimed at a section of the field where a fielder is rarely placed – particularly in Twenty20 and One Day International cricket where the number of outfielders is limited. However, the Marillier shot is played over the batter's shoulder to fine leg, but the basis of the scoop stroke is for the batter to go down on one knee to a good length or slightly short-of-length delivery off a fast or medium paced bowler and scoop the ball over the head of the wicket-keeper. The scoop shot is a risky shot to play as the improper execution of this shot may lead to a catch being offered. A version of the scoop stroke called the Dilscoop was developed by Sri Lankan right-handed batter Tillakaratne Dilshan during the 2009 ICC World Twenty20.

==== Helicopter shot ====
The helicopter shot is the act of hitting the ball by means of a wristy flick, using the bottom-hand as the dominant force. The shot gets its name from the flourish completing the stroke, with the bat being circled overhead. It has been considered an unconventional and innovative stroke which, when hit executed effectively, can be used to score boundaries, even against good yorkers or fuller-length deliveries, which have traditionally been used by faster bowlers towards the end of limited-overs matches because it is difficult to hit such balls to the boundary. The shot got its fame through MS Dhoni, who played it on a regular basis as a way to score boundaries against full and yorker length deliveries.

==== French cut ====
The French cut is a stroke where the ball is hit with the inside edge of the bat, meaning it is directed between the batter and the stumps, and moves away in the direction of the fine leg fielding position. The stroke is very difficult to play intentionally, and is more often a mistake by the batter. It is a risky stroke, and can easily result in the batter playing on to their stumps, resulting in the batter being dismissed as bowled.

== Strategy of batting ==
The fundamental aim of each batter is to find a means of safely scoring runs against each bowler they face. To do this, the batter must take into consideration the bowler's strategy, the position of the fielders, the pitch conditions, and their own strengths and weaknesses. The strategy they will decide on will incorporate a number of preconceived attacking responses to the various deliveries they may anticipate receiving, designed specifically to score runs with minimal risk of being dismissed. The success of this strategy will be dependent upon both the accuracy of its conception and the technical ability with which it is carried out. A key aspect of the strategy of batting is the trade-off between the level of aggression (trying to score) and the risk involved of being dismissed. An optimal batting strategy balances several considerations: the number of wickets left, the target that has been set (if batting last) and how the risk of losing a wicket increase when increasing the strike rate. These strategies depend on the match situation and on the match format. Strategies therefore vary greatly between the three forms of international cricket: Test, One Day International and T20 cricket.

=== Test cricket ===
In Test cricket, the usual aim is to score as high a total as possible. As the overs are unlimited, a batter can take their time to score runs. In general, 90 overs have to be bowled per day in Test match cricket. The openers or the starting players in Test cricket are often chosen for their sound technique and ability to defend their wicket, because the first 1–2 hours of an innings, especially if it begins in the morning, are usually characterised by good conditions for bowling, specifically in terms of the pace and bounce of the pitch and the lateral movement of the ball in the air.

The first-drop batter is usually also chosen for their sound technique, so as to stabilise their end in case an opener gets out. The middle order of a batting team in Test matches usually includes its most skilled batters in terms of shot-playing ability, because during the middle overs of a day batting is relatively easier than in the initial stages of the innings. If the batting innings of a team begins after the last half-hour of the day, the team might employ a nightwatchman to bat after a dismissal.

The nightwatchman is usually a lower-order player, able to protect their wicket primarily by defending dangerous balls and leaving non-dangerous ones rather than looking to produce a large number of runs for their team, but not a complete rabbit, liable to expose other players late in a day. This move prevents a regular players from having to face the last few overs left in the day or bat early the following morning; however, some teams do not employ nightwatchmen for various reasons, including a belief that middle-order player should be able to protect their wicket in poor conditions as well as good, or a lack of defensively minded lower-order batters.

In the third innings, the batting team may score quickly to set a large target to the opposition. This scenario usually occurs on the fourth day's play. The batting captain decides how many overs they are prepared to allow the opposition to chase the batting team's total in their fourth innings. The captain usually declares their team's innings at a predetermined time on the fourth day so they can bowl at least 20 overs on that day and 90 overs on the last day. A good number of overs to bowl at the opposition team in the fourth innings is essential because usually on the fourth and fifth days of a Test match conditions are good for bowling (especially slow bowling), with the pitch having experienced a fair degree of wear and tear. Thus, to make the target as difficult as possible, the batting side speeds up the run rate (runs per over) until the captain declares.

If, however, a batting team is significantly behind the opposition in terms of runs going into the fourth day of a Test match, a typical strategy by the batting team involves playing defensively to avoid losing their wickets. This ensures that they occupy the most time until the match draws to a close on the fifth day, because if a team's innings does not end on the fifth day then the match is drawn, or a stalemate is reached. However, in trying to do so, if the batting team manages to overhaul its deficit and gain a substantial lead (an excess of runs) over the opposition, the captain may consider declaring the innings so they can "force" a victory on the final day, depending on the size of the lead, the readiness of the bowlers, and the state of the pitch.

=== One-Day International cricket ===
As One Day International matches have a limited set of overs, batters try to score quickly. Doing so, batters should aim for a higher run rate than the one which would maximise their expected personal score. It is optimal for batters to take the risk of being dismissed and being replaced by another teammate. This higher risk strategy makes the best of the limited number of overs. Scoring quickly typically means trying to score at least one run per ball bowled. Most batter manage to score at an average of four runs an over (i.e. four runs in the six ball over). The optimal level of risk should vary depending on different factors. It should be higher when the team has more wickets left as they provide of a cushion of security (against the risk of ending all out). It should be higher when the pitch provides good conditions for batting, making it easier to score without great risk of being dismissed. It should increase towards the end of the innings when the number of overs left is small (there is not much to lose in taking the risk of ending all out). Research has shown that teams broadly follow these principles. A noticeable exception is when batters face the possibility of scoring a personal milestone (e.g. century), in that case, they tend to decrease their risk-taking below what is optimal for the team in order to increase their chance of reaching the milestone.

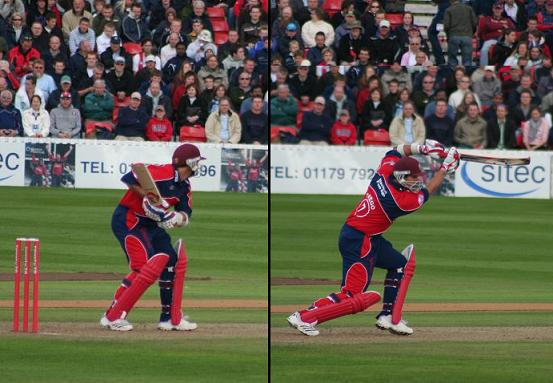
Before the ball reaches a batter (left) the bat is held in a high backlift, before stepping forward and swinging through for a forward drive (right).

When a team goes out to bat, the best players bat first. The first three batters (number 1, 2, 3) are known as the top order; the next four (numbers 4, 5, 6 and possibly 7) form the middle order, and the last four (numbers 8, 9, 10 and 11) are the lower order or tail.

The specialist batters of a team usually bat near the top of the order, so as to score more runs. The openers or opening batter are the first two players to take the crease. They are not necessarily the best batters, but are expected to negotiate the new ball and not lose wickets until the shine on the ball is considerably diminished (a hard and shiny ball bounces and swings more and is more difficult for the batter to face). In addition, they are supposed to play quick innings (more runs in fewer balls), reflecting the fact that the fielding side is subject to restrictions on the placement of fielders in the first 15 overs which makes it easier to score runs. In a recent amendment to the rules of ODI cricket, fielding captains are given mandatory fielding restrictions for the first 10 overs and then two chunks of 5 overs each, also known as power-play overs, which they may impose at any stage of their choice within the stipulated 50 overs.

Following the openers is the No. 3 or first-drop batter. Their job is to take over from the openers and typically play a careful and prolonged innings, effectively tying up one end of the batting. This brings in some stability in the batting, as new batters find it difficult to settle down and it helps to have a settled player at the other end. The best batter of the team is usually put at number 3 or 4, to protect them from the difficulties of batting against the best bowlers on a fresh pitch and to allow them to play long innings.

The middle order is often considered the most valuable asset of a batting line-up in One-Day Internationals because its members are responsible for consolidating the batting team's position through the middle part of the 50 overs. Characteristic of middle-order batting is the practice of taking many singles (or ones) and 'twos', with only the occasional boundary (a four or a six), as opposed to the more flamboyant openers who score primarily in boundaries. This is because the fielding restrictions on the opposition are lifted in the middle overs so that the percentage of boundaries scored decreases. Middle-order players are often chosen for the ability to run hard and fast between the wickets (to maximise the number of runs not scored from boundaries) and for their endurance and patience. The middle order typically sets the stage for an aggressive assault on the bowling in the final 10 overs of the match. To achieve this assault, two things are necessary – a number of hard-hitting players yet to bat or not out and a number of wickets in hand (since aggression means a greater likelihood of losing wickets). The last 10 overs of a one-day cricket match innings is often the most exciting part of the innings, because of a large number of boundaries scored and wickets taken. During the last ten overs of an ODI, batters often use shots that are riskier than shots played at the beginning of the innings.

Examples of risky shots include the reverse sweep and the paddle-scoop. These shots are used to achieve a boundary which would not be possible when playing a safer, more orthodox shot. Finally, the lower order consists of the bowlers of the team, who are not known for their batting prowess and so bat as low down the order as possible.

However, there are no real restrictions to the batting positions. Captains have been known to experiment with the batting line-up to gain specific advantages. For example, a lower-order player is sometimes sent in at number 3 with instructions to pinch-hit (playing aggressively in an attempt to score more runs in fewer balls – a term borrowed from baseball) to score quick runs and shield better players, as their wicket (as a less accomplished, lower-order, player) is less valuable anyway.

== Running between the wickets ==
When batting, a batter has to balance opportunities to score runs by running between the popping creases with the risk of being run out (or even stumped, if batting outside their crease). Batting partners must agree on each run they take, or else one of them is likely to be out of their ground and thus run out.

Sometimes batters take risks by running even when the fielder has the ball in hand, and is in a position to throw the ball at the wicket; this is known as "taking on the arm of the fielder". This can occasionally lead to overthrows.

Batters often slide headfirst with their bat outstretched to make their ground. Being able to run faster to score more runs, as well as improve endurance so as to not be fatigued by running a lot throughout a long innings (which could disrupt the concentration or strength needed for batting), is part of the athletic training for batters.

== See also ==
- Bowling (cricket)
- Fielding (cricket)
- Glossary of cricket terms
- Batting (baseball)
