= Fielding (cricket) =

Collecting the ball to force dismissal

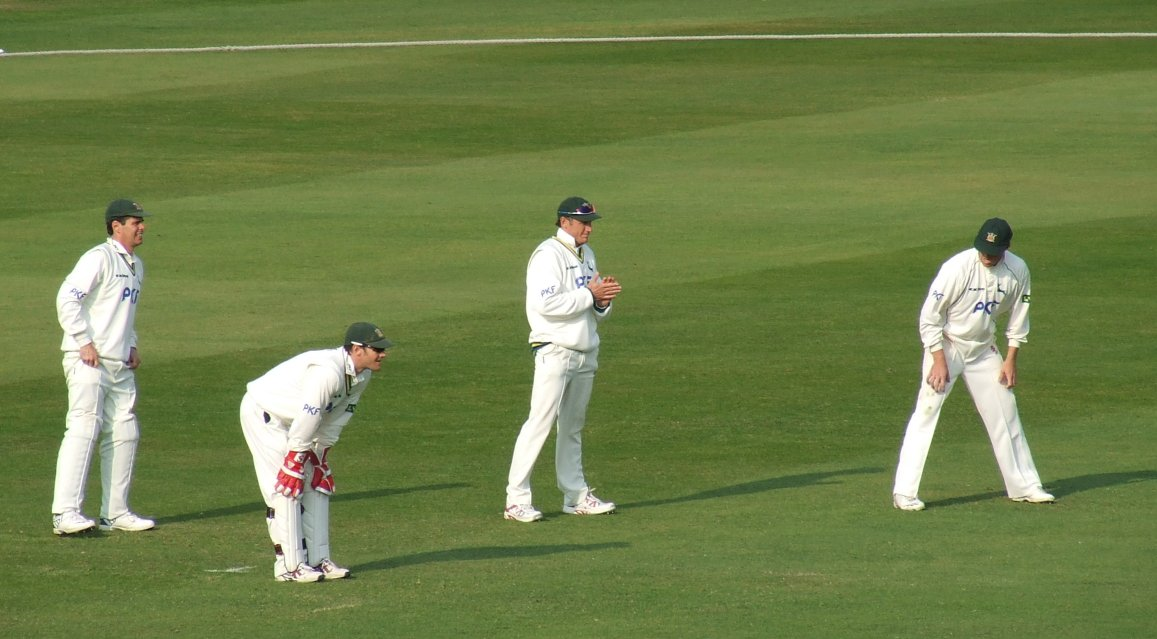
A wicket-keeper (bending down) and three slips wait for the next ball. The batter – out of shot – is a left-hander.

Fielding in the sport of cricket is the action of fielders in collecting the ball after it is struck by the striking batter, to limit the number of runs that the striker scores and/or to get a batter out by either catching a hit ball before it bounces, or by running out either batter before they can complete their current run. There are a number of recognised fielding positions and they can be categorised into the offside and leg side of the field. Fielding also involves trying to prevent the ball from making a boundary where four "runs" are awarded for reaching the perimeter and six for crossing it without touching the grass.

A fielder may field the ball with any part of their body. However, if, while the ball is in play, they wilfully field it otherwise (e.g. by using their hat) the ball becomes dead and five penalty runs are awarded to the batting side, unless the ball previously struck a batter not attempting to hit or avoid the ball. Most of the rules covering fielders are set out in Law 28 of the Laws of cricket. Fake fielding is the action when a fielder makes bodily movements to feign fielding to fool batters into making mistakes and is a punishable offence under the ICC rules.

== Fielding position names and locations ==
Fielding positions for a right-handed batter

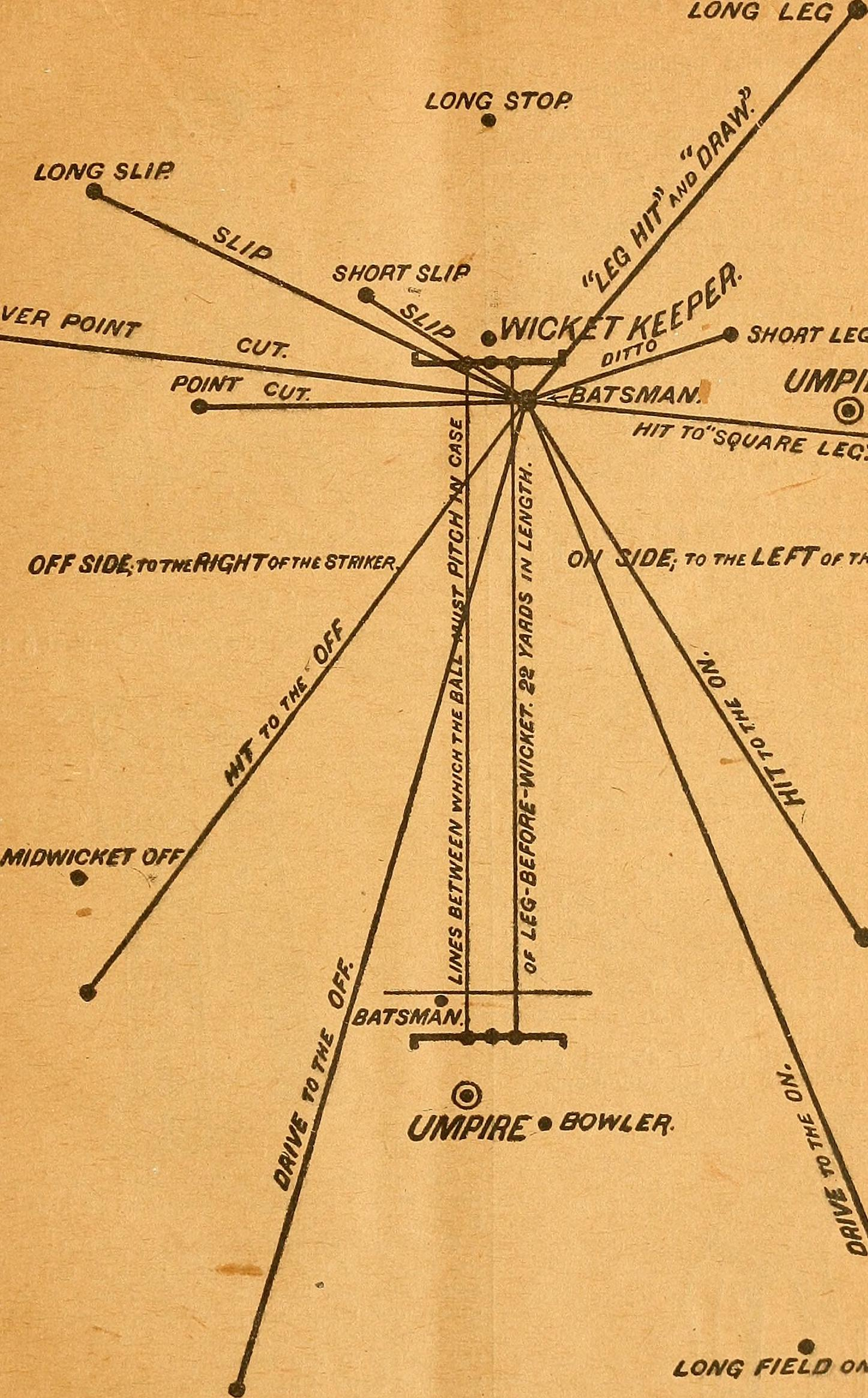
Some historic fielding position names, from the 1893 publication The reliable book of outdoor games

There are 11 players in a team: one is the bowler and another is the wicket-keeper, so only nine other fielding positions can be occupied at any time. Where fielders are positioned is a tactical decision made by the captain of the fielding team. The captain (usually in consultation with the bowler and sometimes other members of the team) may move players between fielding positions at any time except when a bowler is in the act of bowling to a batter, though there are exceptions for fielders moving in anticipation of the ball being hit to a particular area.

There are a number of named basic fielding positions, some of which are employed very commonly and others that are used less often. However, these positions are neither fixed nor precisely defined, and fielders can be placed in positions that differ from the basic positions. The nomenclature of the positions is somewhat esoteric, but roughly follows a system of polar coordinates – one word (leg, cover, mid-wicket) specifies the angle from the batter, and is sometimes preceded by an adjective describing the distance from the batter (silly, short, deep or long). Words such as "backward", "forward", or "square" can further indicate the angle.

The image shows the location of most of the named fielding positions based on a right-handed batter. The area to the left of a right-handed batter (from the batter's point of view – facing the bowler) is called the leg side or on side, while that to the right is the off side. If the batter is left-handed, the leg and off sides are reversed and the fielding positions are a mirror image of those shown.

=== Catching positions ===
Some fielding positions are used offensively. That is, players are put there with the main aim being to catch out the batter rather than to stop or slow down the scoring of runs. These positions include Slip (often there are slips next to each other, named First slip, Second slip, Third slip, etc., numbered outwards from the wicket-keeper – collectively known as the slip cordon) meant to catch balls that just edge off the bat; Gully; Fly slip; Leg slip; Leg gully; the short and silly positions. Short leg, also known as bat pad, is a position specifically intended to catch balls that unintentionally strike the bat and leg pad, and thus end up only a metre or two to the leg side.

=== Other positions ===
- Wicket-keeper
- Long stop, who stands behind the wicket-keeper towards the boundary (usually when a wicket-keeper is believed to be inept; the position is almost never seen in professional cricket). It was an important position in the early days of cricket, but with the development of wicket-keeping techniques from the 1880s, notably at first by the Australian wicket-keeper Jack Blackham, it became obsolete at the highest levels of the game. The position is sometimes euphemistically referred to as very fine leg. An example of this position taking a wicket in the modern game occurred during the England vs India test match in July 2025. Washington Sundar was attempting to smash quick runs in a final wicket partnership, bowler Jofra Archer asked for and received a long stop after a swipe off the first ball, the next ball was an attempted pull shot that flew off the top edge of the bat and went into the hands of Harry Brook standing behind the wicket keeper.
- Sweeper, an alternative name for deep cover, deep extra cover or deep midwicket (that is, near the boundary on the off side or the on side), usually defensive and intended to prevent a four being scored.
- Cow corner, an informal jocular term for the position on the boundary between deep midwicket and long on.
- On the 45. A position on the leg side 45° behind square, defending the single. An alternative description for backward short leg or short fine leg.

The bowler after delivering the ball must avoid running on the pitch, and so usually ends up fielding near silly mid on or silly mid off. Fast bowlers will continue running to exit the pitch and only change direction for balls dropped in front of the wicket. Spin bowlers with the slowest run-ups will usually cease their movement immediately after their delivery, planting their feet before the ball arrives to the batsman to react to a ball hit back up the pitch toward them. The bowler is generally understood to have the responsibility to defend the stumps at the non-strikers end of the pitch and so after a shot is made they will return to the stumps to catch any incoming throw, on rare occasions where a wicket-keeper has fallen or had to run to gather the ball the bowler may be the closest to the non-strikers stumps as well and so will move to the other end of the pitch. Once the play is dead they will walk back toward their bowling mark. In the laws of cricket the ball play is considered dead after the runners have ceased attempting to score and the ball has been returned to either the wicket-keeper or the bowler.

=== Modifiers ===
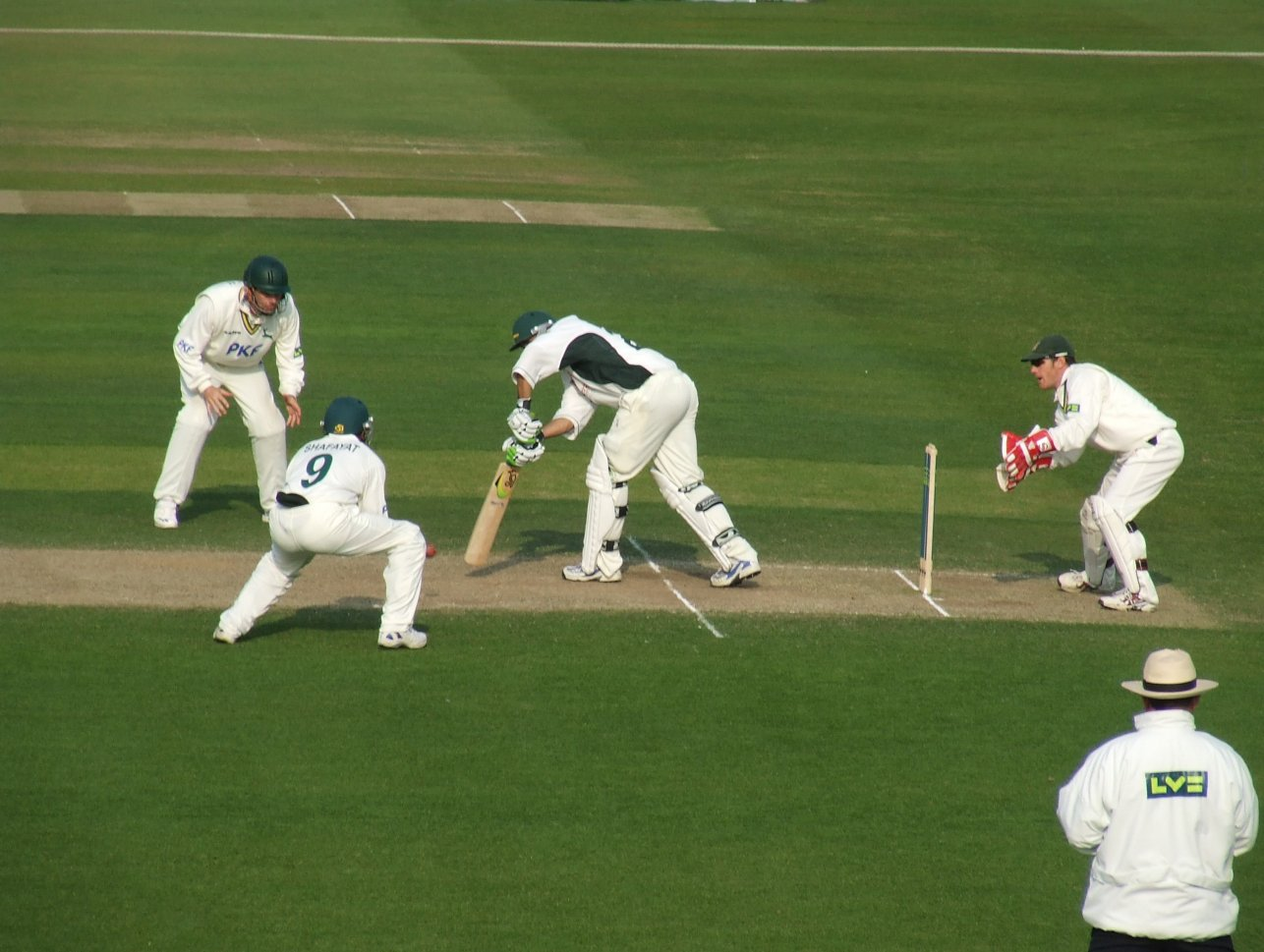
Example of two close fielders: a short leg and a silly point stand close to the batters on either side of the pitch. They are both wearing protective equipment (helmets and leg pads). The wicket-keeper is 'standing up' to the stumps, and the square leg umpire is also visible.

Saving one or On the single
As close as the fielder needs to be to prevent the batters from running a quick single, normally about 15–20 yards (14–18 m) from the wicket.
Saving two
As close as the fielder needs to be to prevent the batters from running two runs, normally about 50–60 yards (46–55 m) from the wicket.
Right on
Literally, right on the boundary.
Deep, long
Farther away from the batter.
Short
Closer to the batter.
Silly
Very close to the batter, so-called because of the perceived danger of doing so.
Square
Somewhere along an imaginary extension of the popping crease.
Fine
Closer to an extension of an imaginary line along the middle of the pitch bisecting the stumps, when describing a fielder behind square.
Straight
Closer to an extension of an imaginary line along the middle of the pitch bisecting the stumps, when describing a fielder in front of square.
Wide
Further from an extension of an imaginary line along the middle of the pitch bisecting the stumps.
Forward
In front of square; further towards the end occupied by the bowler and further away from the end occupied by the batter on strike.
Backward
Behind square; further towards the end occupied by the batter on strike and further away from the end occupied by the bowler.

Additionally, commentators or spectators discussing the details of field placement will often use the terms for descriptive phrases such as "gully is a bit wider than normal" (meaning they are more to the side than normal) or "mid off is standing too deep, they should come in shorter" (meaning they are too far away and should be positioned closer to the batter).

== Restrictions on field placement ==
Fielders may be placed anywhere on the field, subject to the following rules. At the time the ball is bowled:

- No fielder may be standing on or with any part of their body over the pitch (the central strip of the playing area between the wickets). If their body casts a shadow over the pitch, the shadow must not move until after the batter has played (or had the opportunity to play) at the ball.
- There may be no more than two fielders, other than the wicket-keeper, standing in the quadrant of the field behind square leg. See Bodyline for details on one reason this rule exists.
- In some one-day matches:
  - During designated overs of an innings (see Powerplay), there may be no more than two fielders standing outside an oval line marked on the field, being semicircles centred on the middle stump of each wicket of radius 30 yards (27 m), joined by straight lines parallel to the pitch. This is known as the fielding circle.
  - For overs no. 11–40 (powerplay 2), no more than four fielders should be outside the 30-yard circle.
  - For overs no. 41–50 (powerplay 3) maximum of five fielders are allowed to be outside the 30-yard circle.

The restriction for one-day cricket is designed to prevent the fielding team from setting extremely defensive fields and concentrating solely on preventing the batting team from scoring runs.

If any of these rules is violated, an umpire will call the delivery a no-ball. Additionally a player may not make any significant movement that is not in response to the striker's actions after the ball comes into play and before the ball reaches the striker. If this happens, an umpire will call and signal 'dead ball'. For close fielders, anything other than minor adjustments to stance or position in relation to the striker is significant. In the outfield, fielders may move in towards the striker or striker's wicket; indeed, they usually do. However, anything other than slight movement off line or away from the striker is to be considered significant.

== Tactics of field placement ==
With only nine fielders (in addition to the bowler and wicket-keeper), there are not enough to cover every part of the field simultaneously. The captain of the fielding team must decide which fielding positions to use, and which to leave vacant. The placement of fielders is one of the major tactical considerations for the fielding captain.

=== Attacking and defending ===
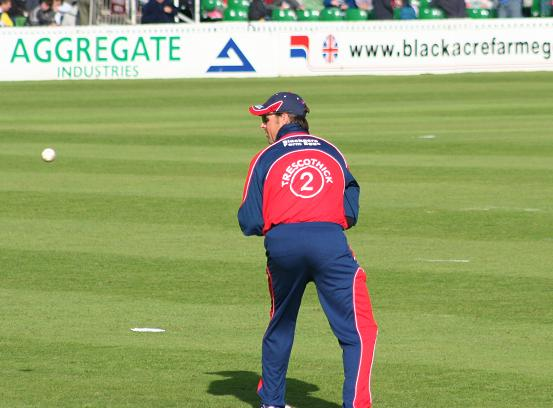
Marcus Trescothick fields at slip during a Twenty20 match.

An attacking field is one in which fielders are positioned in such a way that they are likely to take catches, and thus likely to get the batter out. Such a field generally involves having many fielders close to the batter. For a pace bowler, an attacking field will usually include multiple slips (termed a cordon) and a gully; these are common positions for catching mishit shots. For a spin bowler, attacking positions include one or two slips, short leg or silly point.

A defensive field is one in which most of the field is within easy reach of one or more fielders; the batter will therefore find it difficult to score runs. This generally involves having most fielders some distance from, and in front of, the batter, in positions where the ball is most likely to be hit. Defensive fields generally have multiple fielders stationed close to the boundary rope to prevent fours being scored, and others close to the fielding circle, where they can prevent singles.

Many elements govern the decisions on field placements, including: the tactical situation in the match; which bowler is bowling; how long the batter has been in; the wear on the ball; the state of the wicket; the light and weather conditions; or the time remaining until the next interval in play.

=== Off- and leg-side fields ===
Another consideration when setting a field is how many fielders to have on each side of the pitch. With nine fielders to place, the division must necessarily be unequal, but the degree of inequality varies.

When describing a field setting, the numbers of fielders on the off side and leg side are often abbreviated into a shortened form, with the off side number quoted first. For example, a 5–4 field means 5 fielders on the off side and 4 on the leg side.

Usually, most fielders are placed on the off side. This is because most bowlers tend to concentrate the line of their deliveries on or outside the off stump, so most shots are hit into the off side.

When attacking, there may be 3 or 4 slips and 1 or 2 gullies, potentially using up to six fielders in that region alone. This would typically be accompanied by a mid off, mid on, and fine leg, making it a 7–2 field. Although there are only two fielders on the leg side, they should get relatively little work as long as the bowlers maintain a line outside off stump. This type of field leaves large gaps in front of the wicket, and is used to entice the batters to attack there, with the hope that they make a misjudgment and edge the ball to the catchers waiting behind them.

As fields get progressively more defensive, fielders will move out of the slip and gully area to cover more of the field, leading to 6–3 and 5–4 fields.

If a bowler, usually a leg spin bowler, decides to attack the batter's legs in an attempt to force a stumping, bowl him behind their legs, or induce a catch on the leg side, the field may stack 4–5 towards the leg side. It is unusual to see more than five fielders on the leg side, because of the restriction that there must be no more than two fielders placed behind square leg.

Sometimes a spinner will bowl leg theory and have seven fielders on the leg side, and will bowl significantly wide of the leg stump to prevent scoring. Often the ball is so wide that the batter cannot hit the ball straight of mid-on while standing still, and cannot hit to the off side unless they try unorthodox and risky shots such as a reverse sweep or pull, or switch their handedness. The batter can back away to the leg side to hit through the off side, but can expose their stumps in doing so.

The reverse tactic can be used, by fast and slow bowlers alike, by placing seven or eight fielders on the off side and bowling far outside off stump. The batter can safely allow the ball to pass without fear of it hitting the stumps, but will not score. If they want to score they will have to try and risk an edge to a wide ball and hit through the packed off side, or try to drag the ball from far outside the stumps to the sparsely populated leg side.

Another attacking placement on the leg side is the leg side trap, which involves placing fielders near the boundary at deep square and backward square leg and bowling bouncers to try to induce the batter to hook the ball into the air. For slower bowlers, the leg trap fieldsmen tend to be placed within 10–15 m from the bat behind square, to catch leg glances and sweeps.

== Protective equipment ==
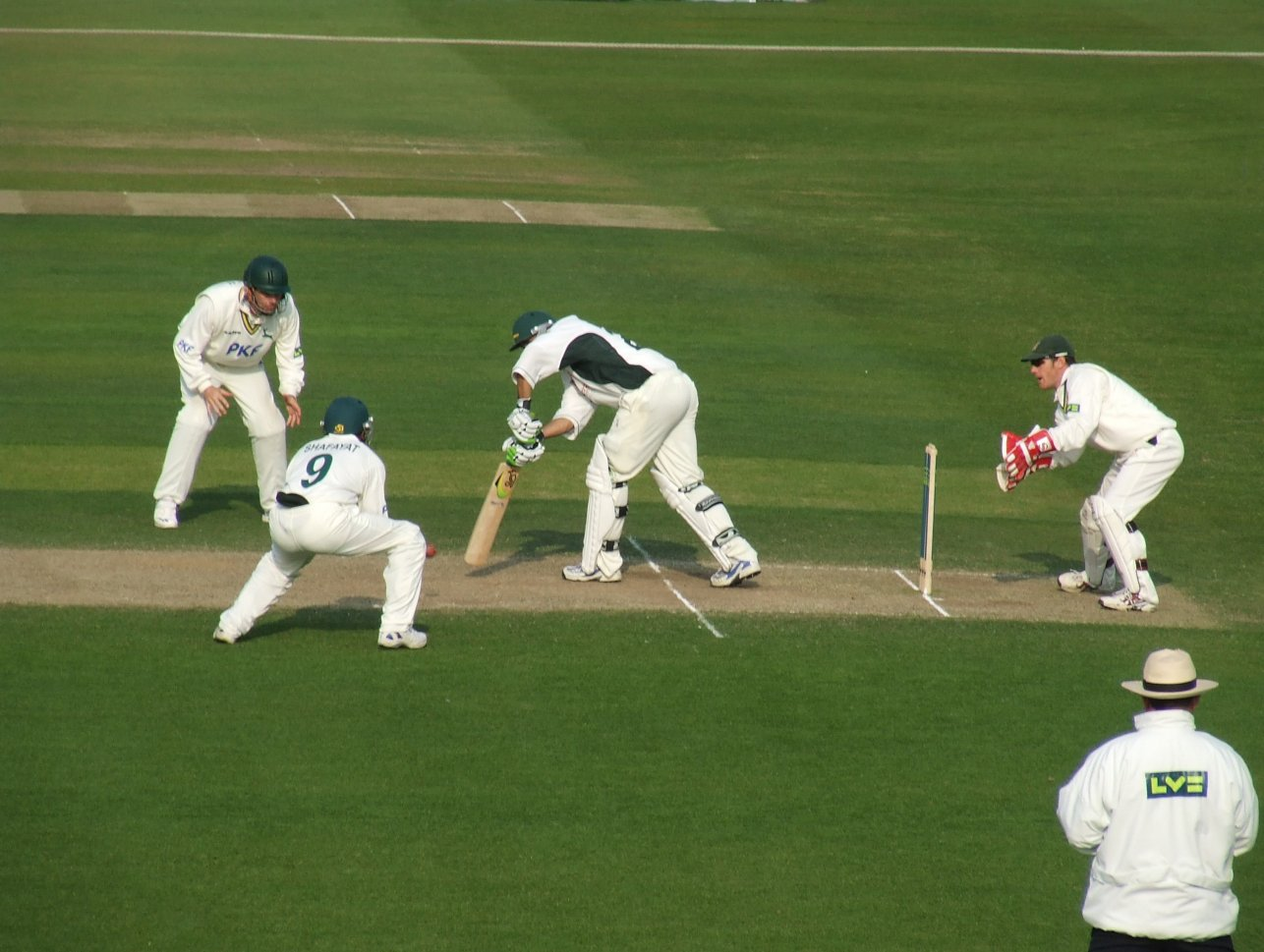
A silly point (far) and a short leg (near) fielding for Nottinghamshire. Both are wearing helmets. The wicket-keeper's shin pads are on the outside of their trousers, but the fielders must fit their guards underneath their clothing.

No member of the fielding side other than the wicket-keeper may wear gloves or external leg guards, though fielders (in particular players fielding near to the bat) may also wear shin protectors, groin protectors ('boxes') and chest protectors beneath their clothing. Apart from the wicket-keeper, protection for the hand or fingers may be worn only with the consent of the umpires.

Fielders are permitted to wear a helmet and face guard. This is usually employed in a position such as silly point or silly mid-wicket, where proximity to the batter gives little time to avoid a shot directly at their head. If the helmet is only being used for overs from one end, it will be placed behind the wicket-keeper when not in use. Some grounds have purpose-built temporary storage for the helmet, shin pads etc., in the form of a cavity beneath the field, accessed through a hatch about 1 m (3 ft) across flush with the grass. 5 penalty runs are awarded to the batting side should the ball touch a fielder's headgear whilst it is not being worn, unless the ball previously struck a batter not attempting to hit or avoid the ball. This rule was introduced in the 19th century to prevent the unfair practice of a fielder using a hat (often a top hat) to take a catch.

As cricket balls are hard and can travel at high speeds off the bat, protective equipment is recommended to prevent injury. There have been a few recorded deaths in cricket, but they are extremely rare, and not always related to fielding.

== Fielding skills ==
Fielding in cricket requires a range of skills.

Close catchers require the ability to be able to take quick reaction catches with a high degree of consistency. This can require considerable efforts of concentration as a catcher may only be required to take one catch in an entire game, but their success in taking that catch may have a considerable effect on the outcome of the match.

Infielders field between 20 and 40 yards away from the batter. The ball will often be hit at them extremely hard, and they require excellent athleticism as well as courage in stopping it from passing them. Infield catches range from simple, slow moving chances known as "dollies" to hard hit balls that require a spectacular diving catch. Finally, infielders are the main source of run outs in a game of cricket, and their ability to get to the ball quickly, throw it straight and hard and make a direct hit on the stumps is an important skill.

Outfielders field furthest from the bat, typically right on the boundary edge. Their main role is to prevent the ball from going over the boundary and scoring four or six runs. They need good footspeed to be able to get around the field quickly, and a strong arm to be able to make the 50–80-yard throw. Outfielders also often have to catch high hit balls that go over the infield.

=== Fielding specialities ===
Many cricketers are particularly adept in one fielding position and will usually be found there:

- Slips and bat pad require fast reactions, an ability to anticipate the trajectory of the ball as soon as it takes the edge, and intense concentration. Most top slip fielders tend to be top-order batters, as these are both skills that require excellent hand–eye coordination. Wicket-keepers and bat-pad tend to be amongst the shortest players of the team.
- It is common for the captain of a team to position themselves at slip or a similar close in fielding position. This enables them to remain close to the bowler, wicket-keeper and central umpire and to be able to survey the field from a central location in a similar manner to the batsman. It also reduces the energy they use during fielding as such positions are unlikely to require significant running or needing to shuttle back and forth swapping sides of the pitch when the batting partnership is one right and one left handed batter. Australian and New South Wales captain Mark Taylor was a specialist first slip fielder during his long career as an opening batsman. In his first match as the One-Day International captain for Australia he took four catches at first slip against the West Indies, and in Test Matches he effected 157 catches with a significant amount at first slip.
- Pace bowlers will often be found fielding in the third man, fine leg and deep backward square positions during the overs between those they are bowling. These positions mean that they are at the correct end for their bowling over. They should see relatively little fielding action with plenty of time to react, allowing them to rest between overs. They also usually have an ability to throw the ball long distances accurately.
- Players noted for their agility, acceleration, ground diving and throwing accuracy will often field in the infield positions such as point, cover and mid-wicket. In short forms like T20 and One-Day internationals, the fastest players on a team will be used as "sweepers", on the sides the field at the very edge of the boundary where their pace can enable them to stop a ball from going for 6 or 4 runs.

Players are not selected purely because of their fielding skills in modern organised cricket. All players are expected to win their place in the team as a specialist batter, bowler or all-rounder. Due to the lack of restrictions on substitute fielders some teams will use a well regarded fielder from local club sides as an 'emergency fielder', who temporarily takes the place of another player and is prohibited from bowling, batting or acting as captain. An example of this was in the 2005 Ashes series with England using Gary Pratt, a 24 year old batter who was already past the peak of his batting career in first class cricket. Pratt fielded a quick single from Damien Martyn then threw down the stumps to dismiss Australian Captain Ricky Ponting.

Wicket-keepers were the one exception to the rule, as their specialist position was viewed as being so important that fielding as a keeper was more important than their batting, although they were still generally expected to be competent enough to play at the #7 position in the batting order, before the usual four bowlers. Jack Russell and Alec Stewart were in a constant selection battle for England's wicket-keeper position, with Stewart's superior batting competing with Russell who was considered the best wicket-keeper in the world. The back and forth over who should keep wickets lasted for Russell's entire test career from 1989 through to his retirement in 1998. In the early 2000's the role of Wicket-keeper-batter was introduced with the success of the heavy hitting Adam Gilchrist, elevating the expectations on the batting side of a wicket-keeper while retaining high level fielding ability. Wicket-keepers are allowed to bowl though this is extremely rare at higher levels, and no serious attempt has been made to use a wicket-keeper as a regular bowler in top level international cricket.

=== Throwing a cricket ball ===
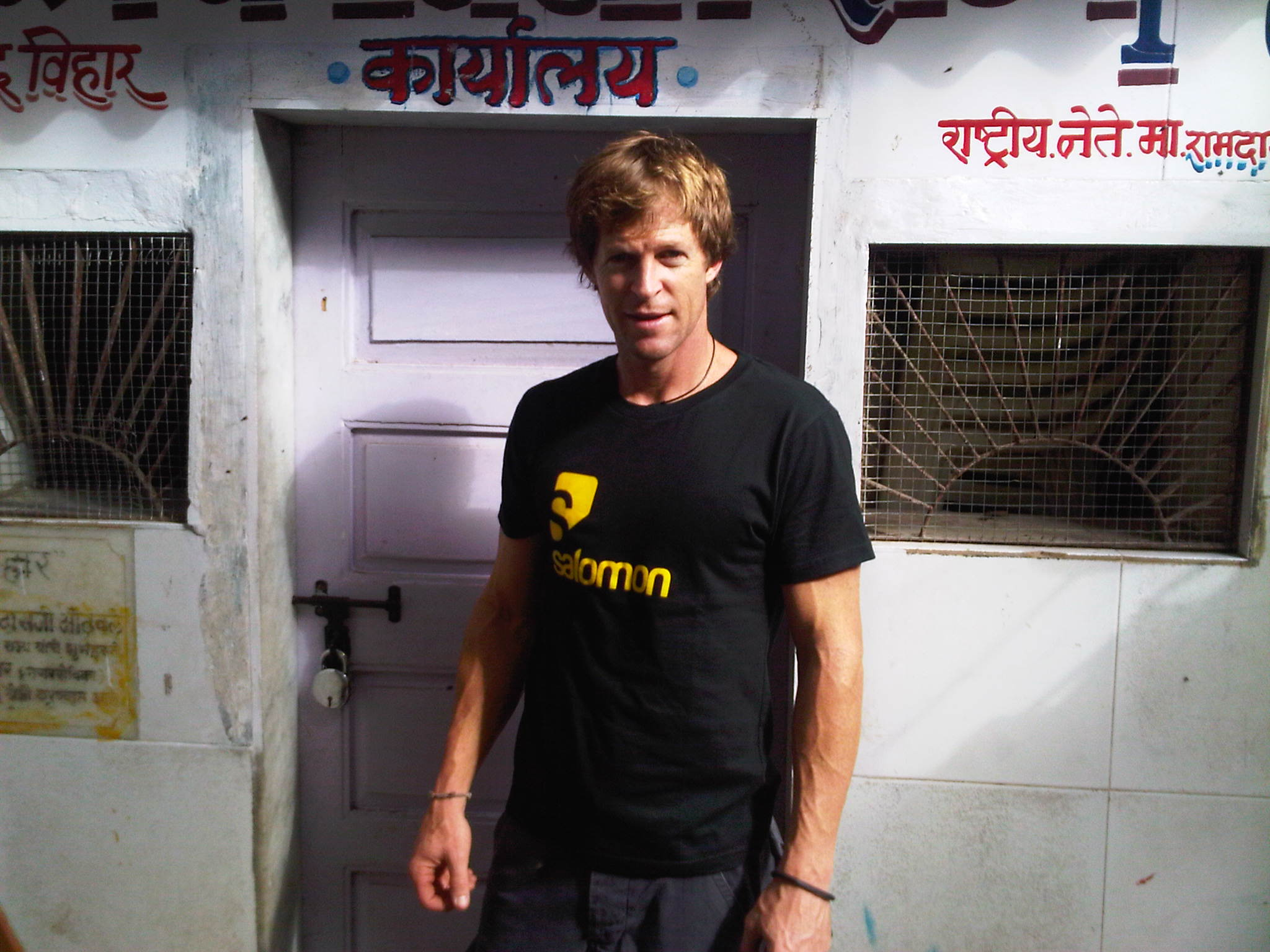
Jonty Rhodes, who typically fielded at backward point, has been fielding coach for South Africa, Mumbai Indians and Kenya.

There have been many competitions for throwing a cricket ball the furthest distance, particularly in the earlier years of the game. Wisden describes how the record was set around 1882, by one Robert Percival at Durham Sands Racecourse, at 140 yards and two feet (128.7 m). Former Essex all-rounder Ian Pont threw a ball 138 yards (126.19 m) in Cape Town in 1981. There are unconfirmed reports that Jānis Lūsis, the non-cricketer Soviet javelin thrower, who won the Olympic gold medal in 1968, once threw a ball 150 yards.

=== Specialist fielding coaches ===
The use of specialist fielding coaches has become more prevalent since the turn of the 21st century, following the trend of specialist batting and bowling coaches within professional cricket. According to cricket broadcaster Henry Blofeld, "Dressing rooms were once populated by the team and the twelfth man, one physiotherapist at most, perhaps a selector and the occasional visitor. That was all. Now, apart from the two main coaches, there are 'emergency fielders' galore; you can hardly see yourself for batting, bowling, fielding coaches, psychoanalysts and statistical wizards and a whole army of physiotherapists". Baseball fielding coaches have been sought out for this purpose before.

== See also ==
- Cricket terminology
- Laws of cricket
- Bowling
- Batting

Other sports

- Fielding (baseball)
