= Ball tampering =

Illegal action in cricket

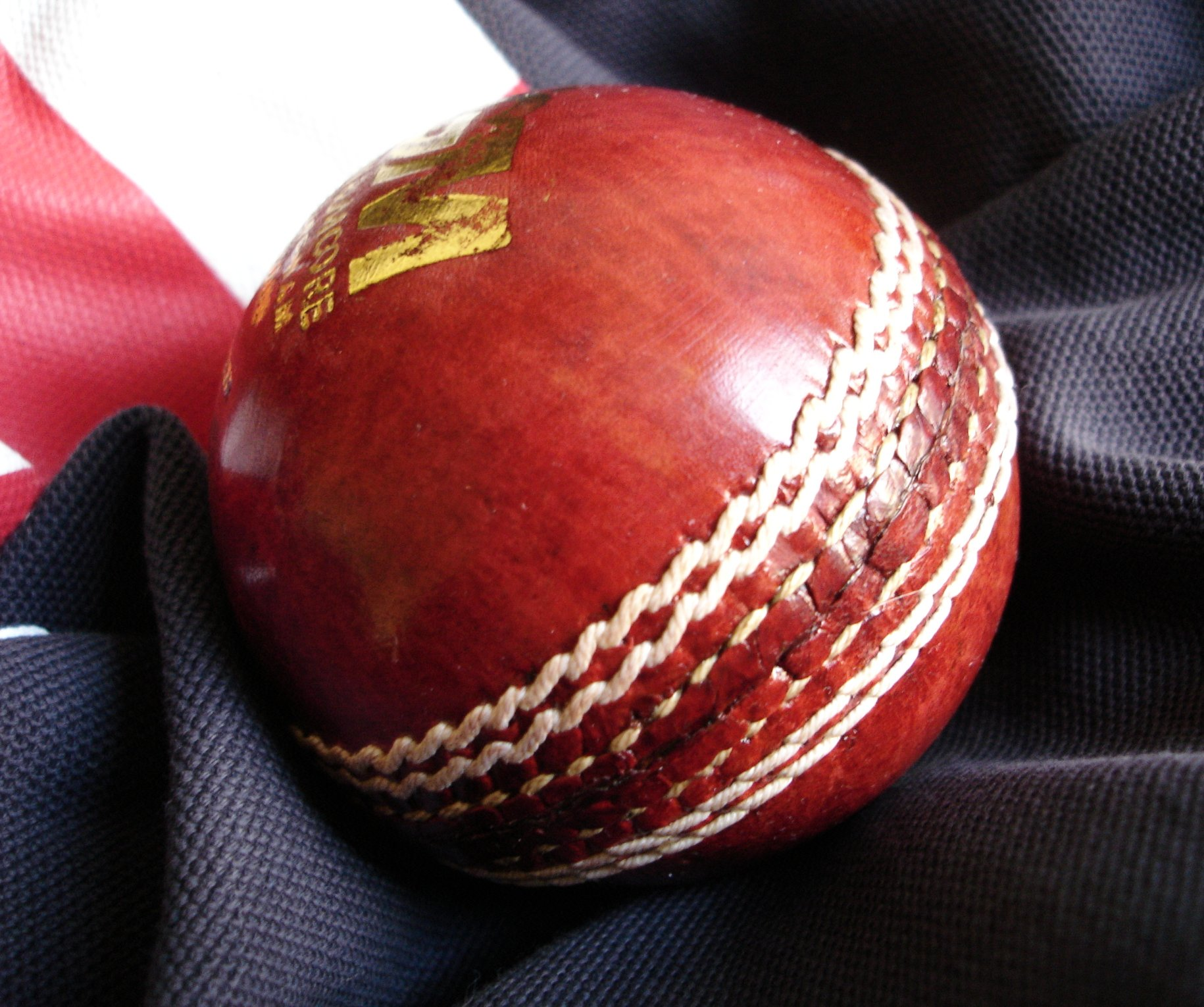
A pristine cricket ball

In the sport of cricket, ball tampering is an action in which a fielder illegally alters the condition of the ball. The primary motivation of ball tampering is to interfere with the aerodynamics of the ball to aid swing bowling.

== Definition ==
Under Law 41, subsection 3 of the Laws of Cricket, the ball may be polished without the use of an artificial substance, may be dried with a towel if it is wet, and have mud removed from it under supervision; all other actions which alter the condition of the ball are illegal. These are usually taken to include rubbing the ball on the ground, scuffing with a fingernail, using sandpaper or other sharp object, or tampering with the seam of the ball.

== Purpose ==
Generally, the purpose of altering the state of the ball is to achieve more favourable bowling conditions. Examples of ball tampering would include a fielder applying a substance, such as lip balm or sweetened saliva, to shine one side of the ball or pick the seam of the ball to encourage more swing. Conversely, roughening one side of the ball by use of an abrasive or cutting surface (such as boot spikes or bottle caps or sandpaper) is also ball tampering.

== Altering a ball legally ==
Using spit and/or sweat is common and, for practitioners of swing bowling, it was integral, though now considered illegal after the COVID-19 pandemic. The moisture gained from spit or sweat when combined with polishing, smooths out one half of the ball which in turn allows air to pass over that side of the ball more quickly than over the other, causing the ball to move in the direction of the rough side. When bowled correctly, a bowler can get the ball to move from one side to the other through the air. Also, it is common for fielders to rub the ball against their clothing to dry or polish it, as seen in most cricket matches.

== Sanction ==
The umpires are responsible for monitoring the condition of the ball, and must inspect it regularly. Where an umpire has deemed a player to be guilty of ball tampering (the Laws refer to unfairly changing the condition of the ball), five penalty runs are awarded to the other side, and, if desired by the opposing captain, the ball is immediately replaced. The replacement ball is chosen by the umpires, and should match the condition of the previous ball (before tampering) as closely as possible. Depending on additional agreements laid out before the beginning of a series of matches, the team may instead be permitted to choose the ball from a selection of balls in various stages of use.

If a bowler is found to be guilty of repeated ball tampering he can be prohibited from continuing to bowl in that innings. Following the conclusion of play, additional sanctions are usually brought against a ball tamperer, as it is considered a serious offence. The captain may also be penalised, if he is also responsible for the conduct of his players on the field.

Following the 2018 Australian ball-tampering scandal, the International Cricket Council (ICC) upgraded ball tampering from a Level 2 offense to a Level 3 offense, increasing the maximum possible penalty from two suspension points (equivalent to a ban for one Test or two white-ball games) to twelve suspension points.

== Examples and allegations ==
The use of foreign substances to polish the ball is illegal, but may be difficult to detect by the umpires. Saliva used to be commonly used to add shine to the ball. Due to the COVID-19 pandemic this has now been banned due to the risk of viral transmission through saliva. It is unclear if this rule will ever be reverted, and players are now using other legal ways to shine the ball such as sweat. Substances which have been used for this purpose include hair gel, sugar from sweets, and lip balm. Some commentators have suggested that this form of undetected ball tampering may be common.

Picking at the threads of the main seam or 'lifting' the quarter seam to aid conventional and reverse swing respectively are also illegal. Modifying the quarter seam can be particularly difficult to detect or prove.

There have been a number of high-profile instances of alleged ball tampering, particularly in international cricket due to the increase in television coverage. As ball tampering is a form of cheating and is often difficult to prove, accusations have frequently been controversial.

=== Chris Pringle, 1990 ===
During a tour of Pakistan, New Zealand bowler Chris Pringle used a concealed bottle cap to rough up one side of a ball during a 1990 series in Faisalabad. Pringle and his captain, Martin Crowe, both later admitted to this after they had retired from the game. The New Zealand team had suspected the Pakistan team of doing the same in the series, but there is no evidence beyond their claims.

=== Michael Atherton, 1994 ===
In the "dirt in pocket" affair, then England captain Michael Atherton was accused of ball tampering during a Test match with South Africa at Lord's in 1994, after television cameras caught Atherton reaching into his pocket and then rubbing a substance on the ball. Atherton denied ball tampering, claiming that he had dirt in his pocket which he used to dry his hands. He was also accused of lying to the match referee. Atherton was summoned to the match referee and was fined £2,000 (equivalent to £4,200 in 2025) for failing to disclose the dirt to the match referee.

=== Waqar Younis, 2000 ===
Waqar Younis became the first player in history to receive a suspension for ball tampering after a match in July 2000, and was fined 50% of his match fee.

=== Sachin Tendulkar, 2001 ===
In the second Test match of India's 2001 tour of South Africa, at St George's Park, Port Elizabeth, match referee Mike Denness suspended Sachin Tendulkar for one game in light of alleged ball tampering. Television cameras picked up images that suggested Tendulkar was scuffing the seam of the cricket ball. The ICC later cleared Tendulkar of ball tampering charges, though said he had cleaned the ball without the umpire's permission.

=== Rahul Dravid, 2004 ===
Rahul Dravid of India rubbed a cough lozenge on the shiny side of the ball at The Gabba during an Australian Tri-Series match against Zimbabwe. India won the match, but footage emerged of Dravid tampering with the ball, and he was fined 50% of his match fee.

=== England cricket team, 2005 ===
Marcus Trescothick admitted in his autobiography, Coming Back to Me, that he used mints to shine the ball to produce more swing: "It was my job to keep the shine on the new ball for as long as possible with a bit of spit and a lot of polish. And through trial and error I finally settled on the type of spit for the task at hand. It had been common knowledge in county cricket for some time that certain sweets produced saliva which, when applied to the ball for cleaning purposes, enabled it to keep its shine for longer and therefore its swing." He found Murray Mints worked the best.

The admission came three years after the conclusion of the 2005 Ashes series, in which England beat Australia, 2–1.

=== Pakistan cricket team, 2006 ===
In 2006, an alleged ball-tampering issue overshadowed a Test match between Pakistan and England, whereby Pakistan refused to take to the field for the evening session after being penalised for ball tampering in the afternoon. Television cameras caught the umpires discussing the condition of the quarter seam. Pakistan are believed to have intended a protest against the decision by delaying their return after tea; however, while they were refusing to play, the umpires awarded the game to England in accordance with the Laws of Cricket.

At 19:50 UTC it was finally announced at a press conference that the Test was over. The ECB's statement said that England were awarded the match by the umpires as Pakistan refused to take the field after being warned that under law 21.3, failure to do so would result in them forfeiting the game. This is the first time a Test match has been decided this way.

As a result of Pakistan's forfeiting of the game, Inzamam was charged and found guilty of "bringing the game into disrepute", though he was cleared of the charges relating to "changing the condition of the ball".

In July 2008, the International Cricket Council (ICC) changed the result of the match to a draw. On 1 February 2009, the ICC reversed their earlier decision, and changed the match result back to a win for England.

=== James Anderson and Stuart Broad, 2010 ===
In January 2010, England bowlers Stuart Broad and James Anderson were accused of ball tampering by stomping the ball with the spikes of their boots in the third Test Match against South Africa. Broad maintained that he was just being lazy, because it was 40 °C (104 °F) in Cape Town that day. Nasser Hussain, who had captained Anderson, said: "Stuart Broad and James Anderson were wrong to behave in the manner they did and I've no doubt that if a player from another country did the same we'd have said they were cheating." No charges were formally requested by South Africa even though they made the accusations at a press conference.

=== Shahid Afridi, 2010 ===
Shahid Afridi, standing in as the Pakistani captain, received a two T20 international match ban for ball tampering in a match against Australia in January 2010. He was caught on camera biting the cricket ball in a bizarre attempt to re-adjust the seam of the ball. The ball was eventually replaced. He told the Hindustan Times that he was trying to smell the ball, but he pleaded guilty to ball tampering. Afridi had previously been banned for tampering with the pitch in a game against England in 2005.

=== Australia vs Sri Lanka, 2012 ===
In the first Test, Sri Lanka notified match referee Chris Broad that Australian bowler Peter Siddle may have been raising the seam of the ball during Sri Lanka's first innings. Peter Siddle collected 5/54. He was later cleared by the ICC.

=== Faf du Plessis, 2013 ===
While fielding during the third day of the second Test in Dubai, cameras captured footage of South Africa fielder Faf du Plessis scuffing the ball against the zip of his trousers. The on-field umpires penalised South Africa by adding 5 runs to Pakistan's total and changing the ball. The match referee imposed a 50% match fee fine on du Plessis after the fielder pleaded guilty, although the team manager Mohammed Moosajee maintained that penalty was "harsh", and the team decided not to challenge the finding as it may have led to heavier sanctions. Despite the "guilty" plea, team vice-captain AB de Villiers maintained that "we are not cheats" and team captain Graeme Smith denied that their participation in ball tampering tainted the series-levelling win, as South Africa went on to record an innings victory during the Test.

=== South Africa vs Sri Lanka, 2014 ===
For the second time in nine months, the South African Test side found itself in a ball-tampering scandal, this time with medium-pace bowler Vernon Philander found guilty of tampering with the ball during the third day of the Galle Test against Sri Lanka in 2014. Philander was found to have breached clause 42.1 of the Laws, "scratching the ball with his fingers and thumb", and was fined 75% of his match fee. South Africa went on to win the Test by 153 runs.

This incident followed speculation by Australian Test batsman David Warner in February 2014 over the South African team's practices in altering the state of the ball during Australia's tour to South Africa. Speaking to Sky Sports Radio, Warner commented on the South African fielders' more "obvious" use of throwing the ball into the ground on return throws after fielding, and South African wicket-keeper AB de Villiers' habit of getting "the ball in his hand and with his glove wipe the rough side every ball." Warner was later fined 15% of his match fee for the comments he made, under an ICC Code of Conduct breach.

=== South Africa vs Australia, 2016 ===
Another South African was charged with ball tampering on 18 November 2016 after their victory in the second Test against Australia in Hobart. Proteas skipper Faf du Plessis was alleged to have tampered with the condition of the ball after TV footage appeared to show him applying saliva onto the ball from a mint or a lolly. The charge was made by the ICC, although Cricket Australia did not file a complaint. Du Plessis was found guilty of ball tampering on 22 November and fined his match fee from the second Test.

=== Australia vs South Africa, 2018 ===
Australian player Cameron Bancroft was charged with ball tampering on 24 March 2018, when videos emerged that showed him rubbing the ball with, and later concealing, a yellow object during day three of the Third Test against South Africa at Newlands Stadium. Bancroft later claimed the object was a short length of yellow adhesive tape to which dirt and grit had adhered, forming an abrasive surface – though four days later, Cricket Australia confirmed that this was actually sandpaper.

Captain Steve Smith and Bancroft attended a press conference at the end of that day's play. Bancroft admitted ball tampering to Andy Pycroft, the match referee, and the press. Smith then said that the tampering was planned by an unnamed "leadership group" during the lunch break. Smith and vice-captain David Warner stood down from the team leadership the morning after the incident, but still played on, with wicket-keeper Tim Paine taking over as captain for the rest of the Test match.

The ICC banned Smith for one Test match and he was fined 100% of his match fee, while Bancroft was fined 75% of his match fee.

As well as a public outcry, especially in Australia, the Australian Sports Commission, the Prime Minister of Australia Malcolm Turnbull, many famous international cricketers and commercial partners of both the Test side and Cricket Australia universally condemned the team for its actions.

Smith, Warner and Bancroft were charged with bringing the game into disrepute, suspended, and sent home. Smith and Warner were then banned from all international cricket and domestic cricket in Australia for twelve months while Bancroft received a nine-month ban. Australia's coach Darren Lehmann, though not directly involved, announced he would step down from his role following the scandal.

=== Sri Lanka vs West Indies, 2018 ===
On the third morning of the second Test between West Indies and Sri Lanka in June 2018, the umpires replaced the match ball and awarded the West Indies five penalty runs when they deemed the Sri Lankan team to have been guilty of ball tampering on the previous day. The Sri Lankan team initially refused to take the field in protest, though they completed the match. Their captain, Dinesh Chandimal, was charged with altering the condition of the ball by the match referee. Chandimal appealed the charge, but he was given a one-match ban by the ICC.

=== Nicholas Pooran, 2019 ===
In November 2019, during the third ODI against Afghanistan, West Indies player Nicholas Pooran was found guilty of ball tampering. Pooran admitted the charge, and was banned for four T20I matches.
