= Penalty run =

Type of extra in cricket

In cricket, a penalty run is a run awarded to one team for various breaches of the Laws by the other team, generally related to unfair play or player conduct. It is a type of extra. Many of these penalties have been added since 2000. Penalties are awarded under Law 41 for Unfair Play and, since 2017 under Law 42 for Players' Conduct

It has been suggested that penalty runs could be imposed for slow over rates.

== History ==
The 1798 Laws of Cricket introduced a new law that stated 'that a penalty of five runs would be awarded to the batting side "if the fieldsman stops a ball with his hat"'. The current laws have a direct equivalent, under Law 28, with the same penalty.

== Penalty runs awarded under Law 28 The Fielder ==
Five penalty runs are awarded to the batting team if:

- The ball strikes a fielder's helmet when it is on the field but not being worn (e.g. when temporarily taken off and on the field behind the wicket keeper). For example:
1. On 12 September 2002 in Colombo, Pakistan were awarded five penalty runs after Rashid Latif's delivery hit Sri Lankan wicket-keeper Kumar Sangakkara's helmet.
2. On 3 January 2010 in Cape Town, South Africa were awarded five penalty runs after Graeme Swann's delivery hit English wicket-keeper Matt Prior's helmet.
3. On 22 October 2016 in Chittagong, England were awarded five penalty runs after Shakib Al Hasan's delivery hit Bangladeshi wicketkeeper Mushfiqur Rahim's helmet.
4. On 8 January 2018 in Sydney (2018 Ashes; 5th Test), England were awarded five penalty runs after the ball from Nathan Lyon to batsman Tom Curran passed the wicketkeeper and hit a helmet.
5. On 24 October 2022 in Hobart (2022 ICC Men's T20 World Cup, 18th Match), Zimbabwe was awarded five penalty runs after the ball touched the glove of de Kock when Lungi Ngidi threw back the ball to South African wicketkeeper Quinton de Kock while he had taken one of his gloves off it on the ground.
6. On 20 June 2025 in Headingly, on day one of the first test in the Anderson–Tendulkar Trophy, India were awarded five penalty runs when a misfield by England's Harry Brook caused the ball to strike a helmet on the ground behind wicket keeper Jamie Smith.
- A fielder fields the ball illegally, by using anything other than his person (for example, using a cap or other item of clothing, or by discarding a piece of clothing, equipment or other object which subsequently makes contact with the ball). For example:
1. On 15 June 2017 in Edgbaston (ICC Champions Trophy; Semi-final), Bangladesh were awarded five penalty runs after the ball bounced off the strewn left glove in a run out attempt by Mahendra Singh Dhoni.
2. On 10 Jun 2022 in Multan, Babar Azam was found illegally fielding using the wicket keeper's gloves (of Mohammad Rizwan) and West Indies was given five penalty runs.
3. In the 2022 One-Day Cup final, Lancashire were awarded five penalty runs after Kent's Harry Finch fielded the ball whilst wearing a wicket keeper's glove after Kent's designated wicket keeper Ollie Robinson had removed it.

== Penalty runs awarded under Law 41 for Unfair Play ==
=== Penalty runs awarded to the batting team ===
Five penalty runs are awarded to the batting team if:

- The ball is touched by a fielder who has returned to the field without the umpire's permission.
- The fielding team deliberately distract or obstruct the batsman. (If the distraction or obstruction occurs before the striker receives the ball, the fielding team must first receive a warning, however penalty runs are awarded for the first instance of such an infringement after the striker has received the ball.)
- After being warned, the fielding team damage the pitch or deliberately waste time between overs, thus ignoring the warning.

=== Penalty runs awarded to the fielding team ===
Five penalty runs are awarded to the fielding side if the batting team:

- Attempt to "steal" a run or deliberately run short. For example:
1. On 15 November 2018 in Kandy, England were awarded five penalty runs after Sri Lanka were judged to have deliberately run a short run.
- Deliberately waste time after having been warned
- Damage the pitch after warning.

The penalty runs are added to the fielding team's score in their previous innings, unless they have not yet batted, in which case the runs are added to their next innings.

=== Penalty runs awarded to either team ===
- Either team may be penalised five runs if the umpires decide that the team have illegally changed the condition of the ball, known as ball tampering. For example:
1. On 20 August 2006 England were awarded five penalty runs for ball tampering after umpires Darrel Hair and Billy Doctrove judged, in the 56th over of the 4th day's play in the fourth Test Match at the Oval, London, that Pakistan had altered the condition of the ball. Because that judgement implied that Pakistan had cheated, considerable fallout resulted. The judgement was overturned by the ICC Code of Conduct hearing 28 September 2006, which concluded that, "The charge of ball-tampering is therefore dismissed." but that ruling could not and did not expunge the penalty runs recorded. However the runs did not affect the result as England were declared winners by forfeiture after the Pakistan players refused to take to the field in protest at the umpires' decision.
2. On 25 October 2013 in Dubai, Pakistan were awarded five penalty runs after Faf du Plessis rubbed the ball on a zipper of his trouser pocket which was deemed to be ball tampering.

Under Law 41.3, any action that changes the condition of the match ball by batters or bowlers may be penalised five runs except in the normal act of batting and, for the fielding team, polishing the ball, removing mud from it, and drying it. In doing these permitted actions the fielders may not use any artificial substance, nor any natural substance except sweat. Any cloth used must be approved by the umpires. Since October 2022 saliva is also permanently forbidden although, prior to Covid, its use was customary.

For the 2025 season, the India Premier League (IPL) decided to re-legalise the use of saliva.

- Either team may be penalised five runs after warning for practising on the pitch on match days, on the rest of the square unless authorised by the umpires, or on the outfield during play except by the fielders, who can only use the match ball, and must not change its condition or waste time.
- Law 41 contains a catch-all (Law 41.2.1) which empowers the umpires, after warning, to award five penalty runs for any action that they judge unfair, which is not otherwise covered.

== Penalty runs awarded under Law 42 for Players' Conduct ==
Under Law 42 five penalty runs are awarded to either team if the umpire judges the conduct of their opponents unacceptable. For Level 1 offences the umpire will warn the offending team first, and award penalties on any repeat occurrence by the same team. After any Level 2, Level 3 ("yellow card") or Level 4 ("red card") offence, no warning is given before awarding penalty runs for the offence, or before awarding penalty runs for any subsequent Level 1 offence by the offending team.

Level 1 offences are:

- wilfully mistreating the cricket ground, equipment or implements
- dissent at an umpire’s decision by word or action
- obscene, offensive or insulting language
- excessive appealing
- advancing in an aggressive manner towards an umpire when appealing
- any other action the umpire considers an equivalent offence

Level 2 offences are:

- serious dissent at an umpire’s decision by word or action
- inappropriate and deliberate physical contact with a player
- throwing the ball at a player, umpire, or anyone else, in an inappropriate and dangerous manner
- using obscene or seriously insulting language or gesture to any other person
- any other action the umpire considers an equivalent offence

Level 3 offences are:

- intimidating an umpire by language or gesture
- threatening to assault a player or any other person except an umpire

Level 4 offences are:

- threatening to assault an umpire. For example:
1. On 10 July 2021, in the 4th T20I between Belgium and Malta, Malta were awarded five penalty runs after Belgium captain Shaheryar Butt reportedly threatened an umpire. This reversed the result.
- making inappropriate and deliberate physical contact with an umpire
- physically assaulting a player or any other person
- committing any other act of violence

Examples of some cases are rare in professional cricket to date. One reason for this is that such an award on the pitch by the umpires will be a judgement of a wilful act, and hence of cheating, which the umpires are unable to determine conclusively at the time, or prefer to be made by the Match Referee at more leisure. Some of the recent Law changes are specifically intended to curb deteriorating behaviour in recreational cricket and hence address the retention of umpires
